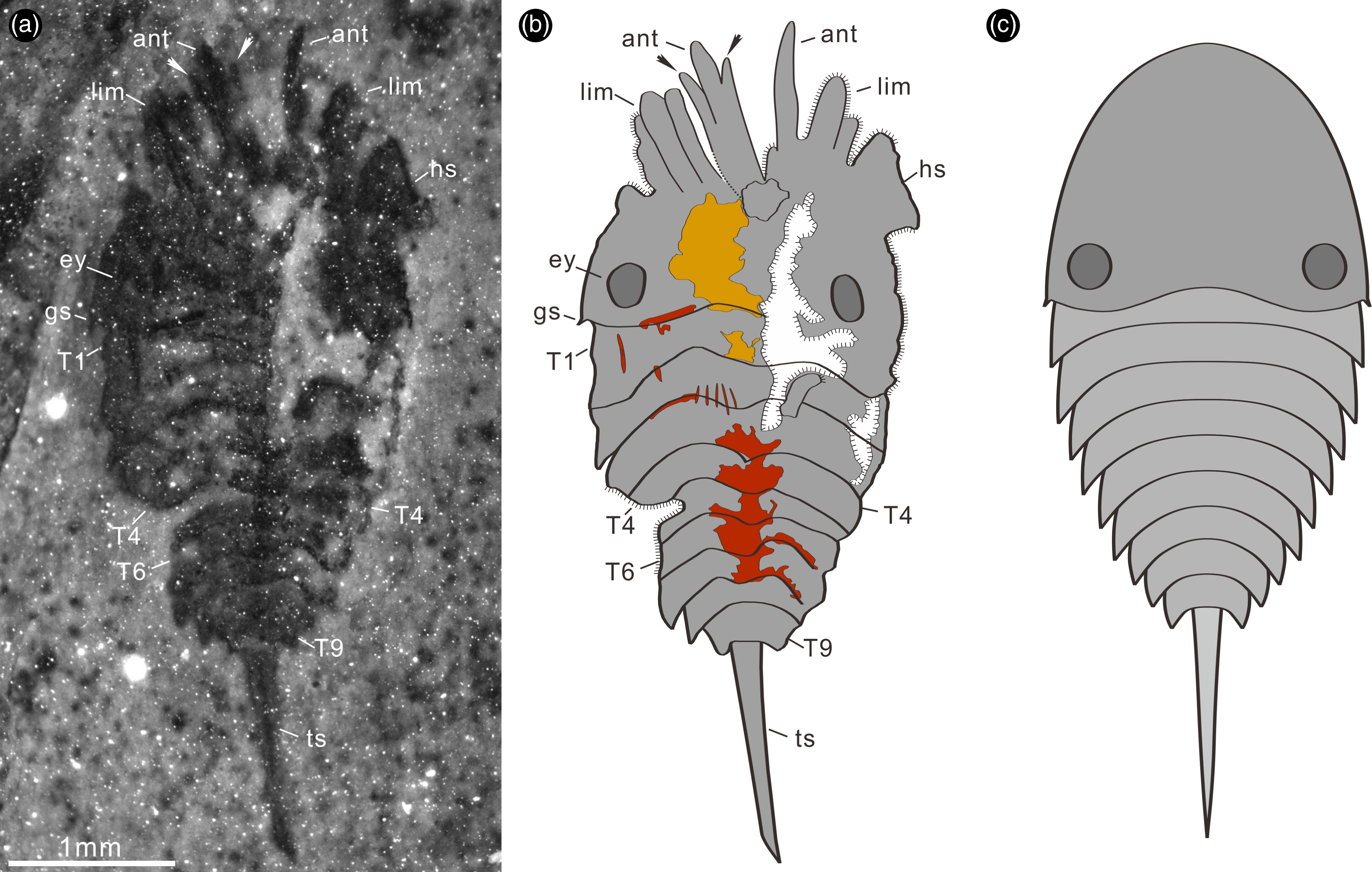

Scientific classification
- Kingdom: Animalia
- Phylum: Arthropoda
- Clade: †Artiopoda
- Genus: †Bailongia; Jiao et al. 2021
- Species: †B. longicaudata

Binomial name
- †Bailongia longicaudata Jiao et al. 2021

= Bailongia =

Bailongia Temporal range: Cambrian Stage 4

Extinct genus of arthropod

Bailongia is an extinct genus of arthropod known from a single species Bailongia longicaudata (longicaudata from Latin: "long-tailed") found in the Cambrian Stage 4 aged Guanshan Biota of Yunnan, China. It was around 5mm long and had a large head shield, nine overlapping tapering tergites and a relatively elongate tailspine. It has been recovered in a relatively basal position within Artiopoda, more derived than Squamacula or Protosutura, but outside Trilobitomorpha or Vicissicaudata.

== Phylogeny ==
After Jiao et al. 2021.

- Artiopoda
  - Squamacula clypeata
  - - Protosutura
      - - Zhiwenia coronata
        - Australimicola spriggi
      - - Acanthomeridion serratum
        - Acanthomeridion anacanthus
    - - Bailongia longicaudata
      - Trilobitomorpha
        - Retifacies abnormalis
        - - - - Kwanyinaspis maotiashanensis
              - Trilobita
                - Olenoides serratus
                - Eoredlichia intermedia
            - Conciliterga
              - Haifengella corona
              - - - Kuamaia lata
                  - Helmetia expansa
                - - Tegopelte gigas
                  - Skioldia aldna
                  - Saperion glumaceum
          - - Xandarellida
              - Cindarella eucalla
              - - Luohuilinella deletres
                - Luohuilinella rarus
                - - Sinoburius lunaris
                  - - Xandarella spectaculum
                    - Phytophilaspis pergamena
            - Nektaspida
              - Buenaspis forteyi
              - - Tariccoia arrusensis
                - Soomaspis splendida
                - Liwia convexa
              - - Naraoia spinosa
                - - Naraoia compacta
                  - Misszhouia longicaudata
      - Vicissicaudata
        - Sidneyia inexpectans
        - - Emeraldella brocki
          - Cheloniellida
            - Cheloniellon calmani
            - - Triopus draboviensis
              - Duslia insignis
          - - Kodymirus vagans
            - - Eozetetes gemmelli
              - Aglaspidida
                - Beckwithia typa
                - - - Chlupacaris dubia
                    - - Quasimodaspis brentsae
                      - - Tremaglaspis unite
                        - - Tremaglaspis vanroyi
                          - Brachyaglaspis singularis
                    - - Cyclopites vulgaris
                      - Australaglaspis stonyensis
                      - - Uarthrus instabilis
                        - Flobertia kochi
                        - - Aglaspella granulifera
                          - - Gogglops ensifer
                            - - Glypharthrus simplex
                              - Aglaspis spinifer
                          - - Chraspedops modesta
                            - - Glypharthrus thomasi
                              - - Glypharthrus trispinicaudatus
                                - Glypharthrus magnoculus
