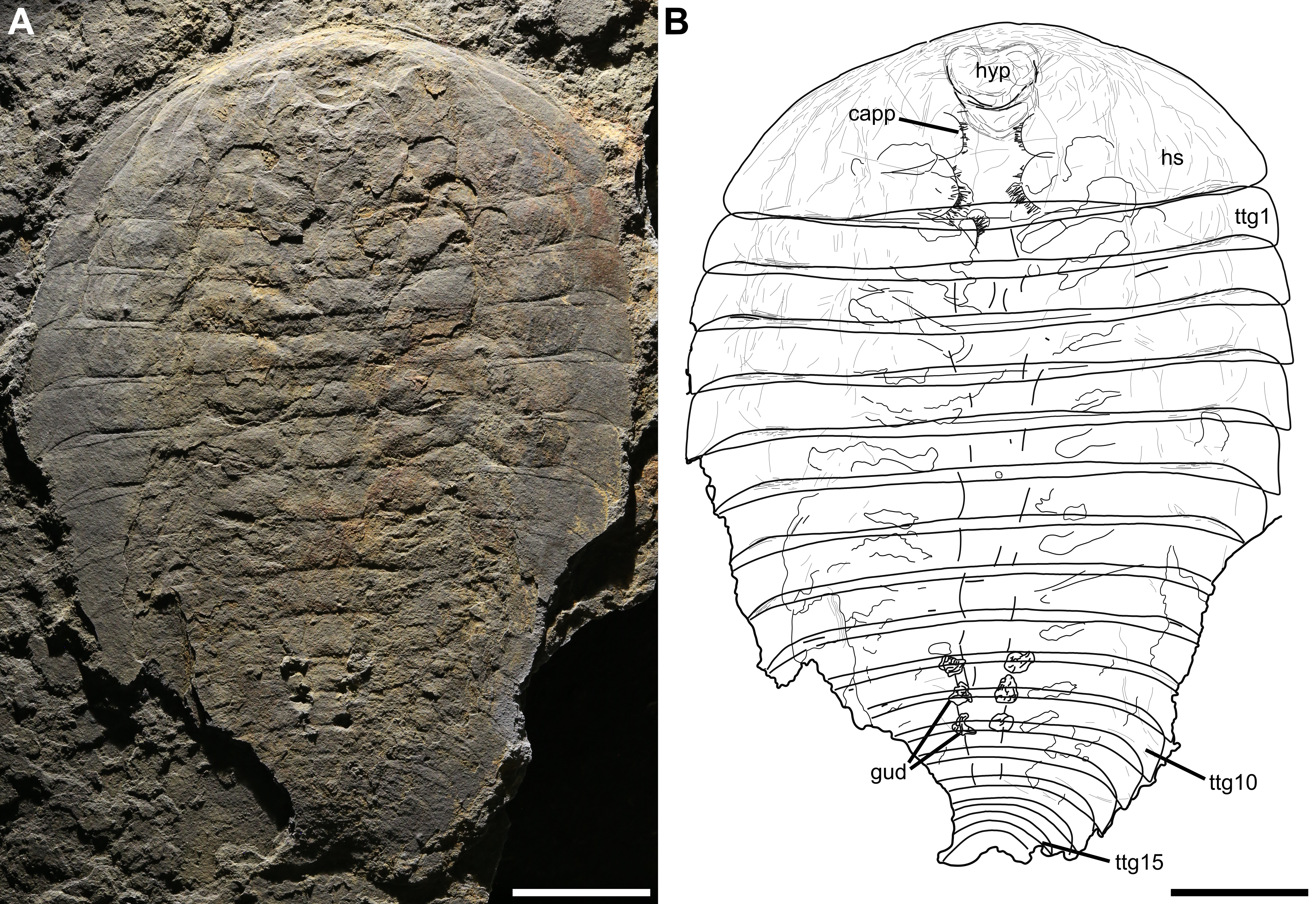
- Holotype specimen
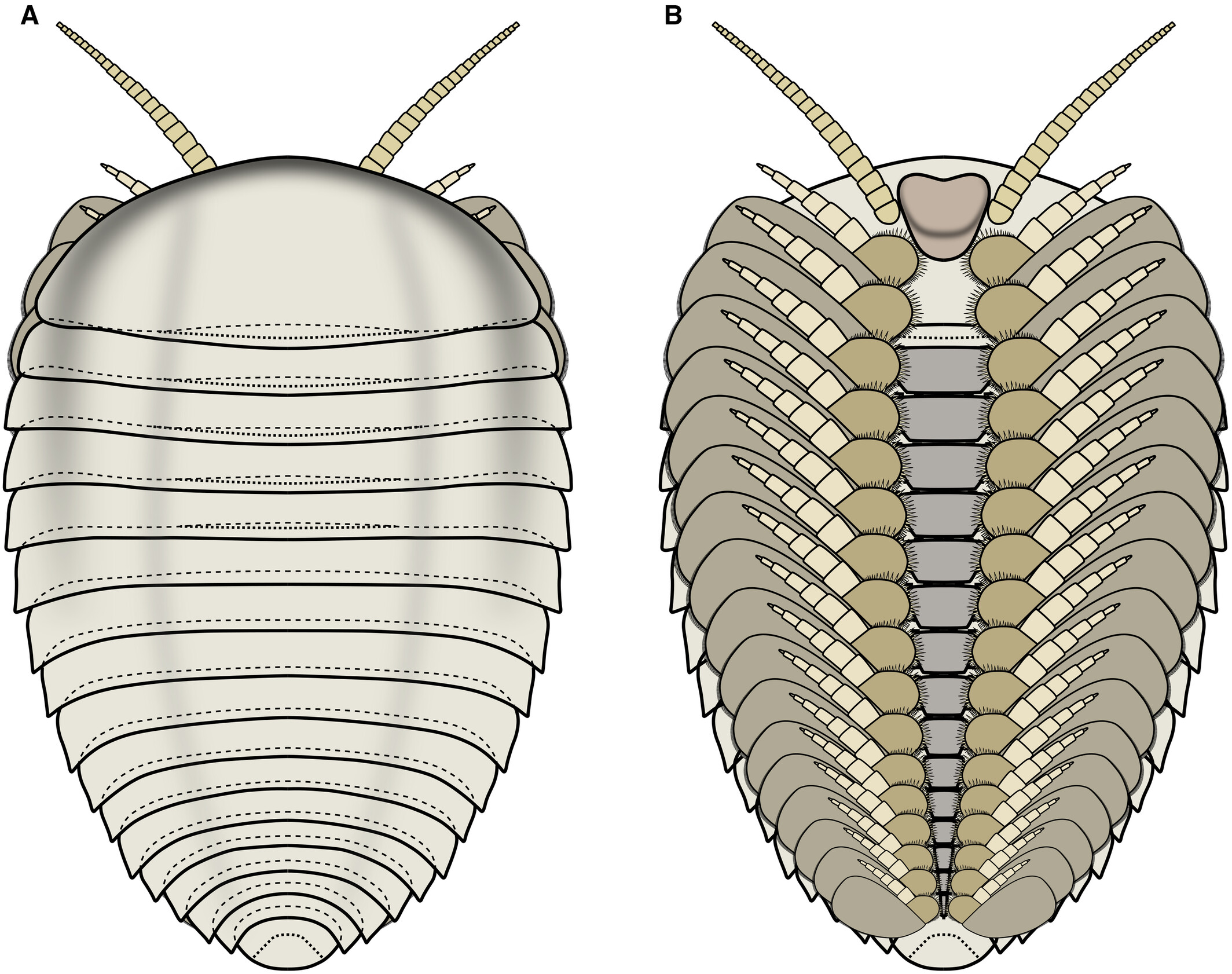
- Reconstruction

Scientific classification
- Kingdom: Animalia
- Phylum: Arthropoda
- Clade: †Artiopoda
- Genus: †Thulaspis; Berks, et al. 2023

Type species
- Thulaspis tholops Berks, et al. 2023

= Thulaspis =

Thulaspis Temporal range: Cambrian Stage 3

Extinct genus of artiopodan

Thulaspis is an extinct genus of artiopodan arthropod from the Cambrian Stage 3 aged Sirius Passet site in Greenland. It is thought to be a close relative of Squamacula, and is possibly one of the most basal members of Artiopoda.

== Description ==
Thulaspsis was relatively large-sized. The largest specimen is about 8.7 centimetres (3.4 in) wide and 12 centimetres (4.7 in) long. The carapace is overall oval-shaped was convex and likely stiff in life, with a raised central axis. The head is broad and bears a pair of antennae, which have at least 20 rectangular segments, and likely two pairs of biramous (two branched) limbs.The body has 15 thoracic segments, which curve forwards in the first few segments, before becoming straight in the fourth and fifth segments, then increasingly posteriorly curved in subsequent segments. At least the first 11 thoracic segments are associated with pairs of biramous limbs. The biramous limbs have robust endopods (lower, leg-like branches), and flap-shaped exopods (upper branches). The body terminates with a pygidium.

== Taxonomy ==
Thulaspsis has been consistently recovered as more closely related to the genus Squamacula that to other artiopods. However, their relationships to other artiopodans are unresolved, though analyses often recover the pair as close to the base of the group. Implied weights parsimony phylogeny after Berks et al. 2023.

- Artiopoda
  - - Thulaspis
    - Squamacula
  - - Protosutura
      - Zhiwenia
      - Australimicola
      - Acanthomeridion
    - - Vicissicaudata
        - Sidneyia
        - - Cheloniellida
          - - Emeraldella
            - - Kodymirus
              - - Eozetetes
                - Aglaspidida
      - Trilobitomorpha
        - - Retifacies
          - Pygmaclypeatus
        - - Xandarellida
          - - Nektaspida
            - - Conciliterga
              - - Kwanyinaspis
                - - Phytophilaspis
                  - Trilobita

== Ecology ==
Thulaspsis was likely a benthic animal that lived on the seafloor, though the flap-like exopods suggest that it was capable of short bursts of swimming when necessary. It likely consumed soft-bodied prey.
