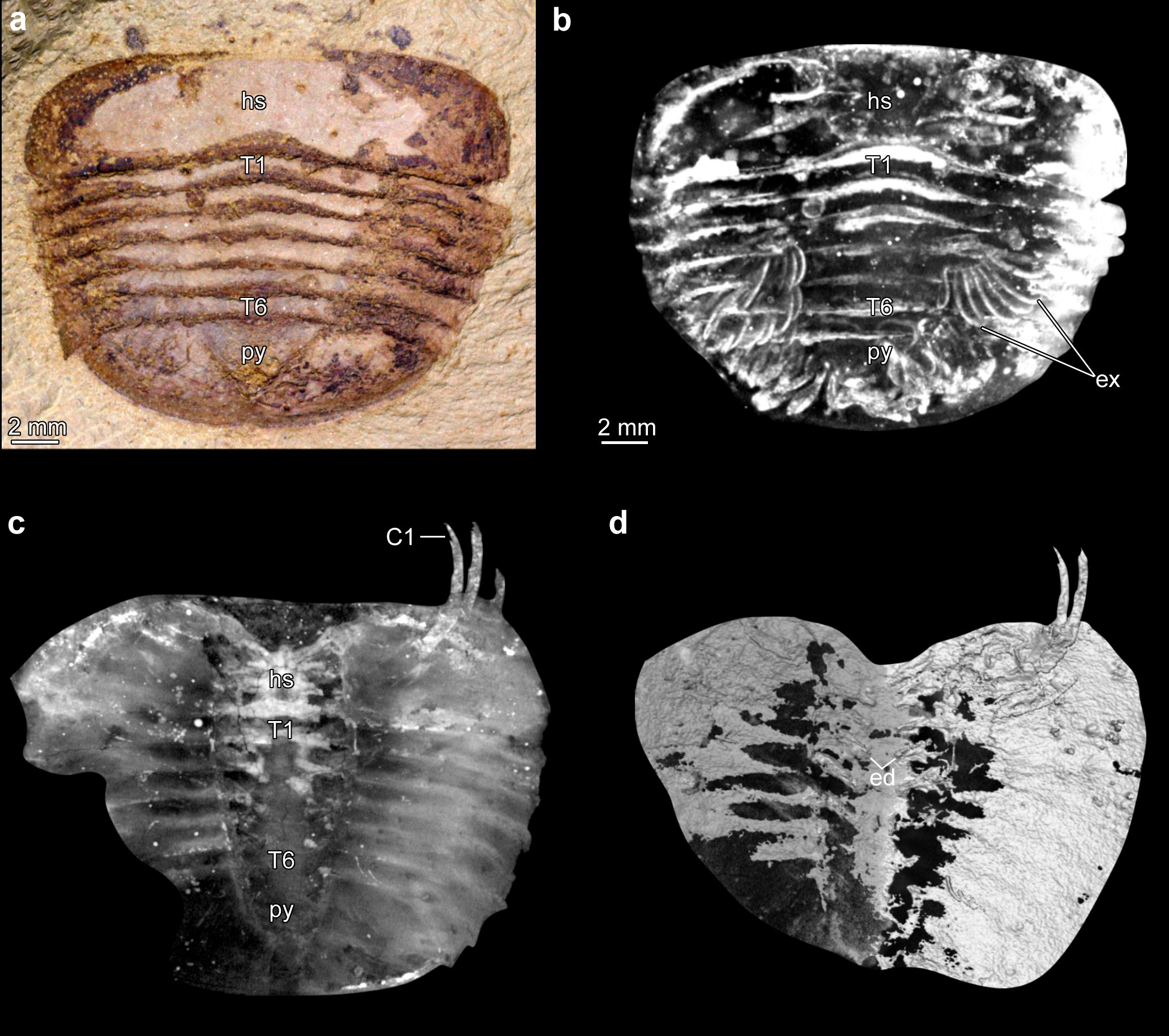
- Fossils
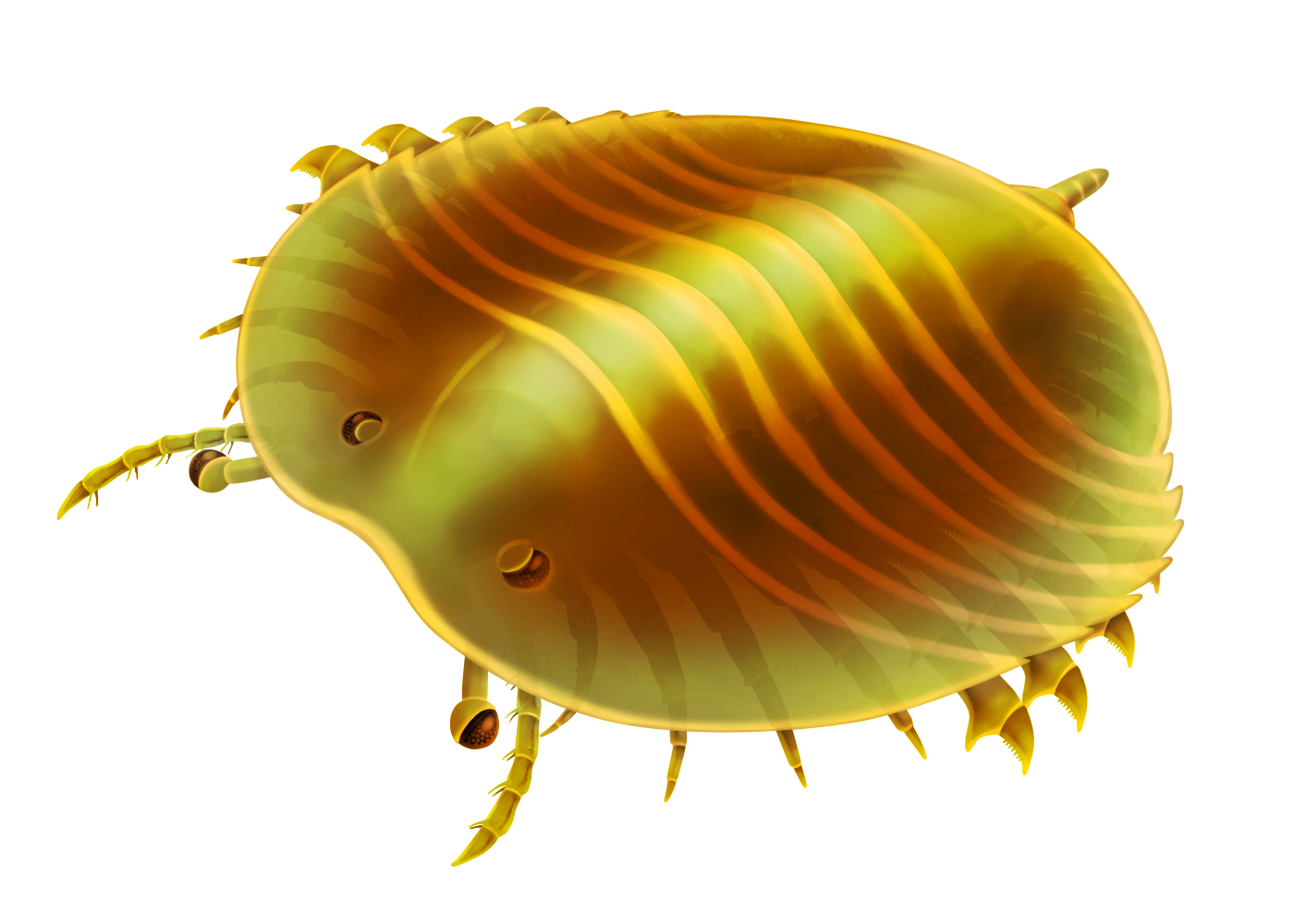
- Life restoration

Scientific classification
- Kingdom: Animalia
- Phylum: Arthropoda
- Clade: Deuteropoda
- Clade: †Artiopoda
- Genus: †Pygmaclypeatus; Zhang et al., 2000
- Species: †P. daziensis

Binomial name
- †Pygmaclypeatus daziensis Zhang et al., 2000

= Pygmaclypeatus =

Pygmaclypeatus Temporal range: Chengjiang

Extinct genus of arthropod

Pygmaclypeatus is a genus of trilobite-like arthropod from the Cambrian aged Chengjiang biota of southern China. The carapace is flat and broad, and slightly shorter than it is wide, reaching a maximum width of 17.5 millimetres (0.69 in) and length of 14 millimetres (0.55 in). The headshield makes up about 25% of the total length, and has attached a pair of antennae, as well as a pair of unstalked eyes on the top of the headshield and pair of stalked eyes attached to the underside. The headshield also has four pairs of biramous (two branched) limbs. The trunk has 6 tergites (segments), each associated with a pair of biramous limbs along with a terminal pygidium associated with four pairs of biramous appendages and a segmented short tailspine. The well developed paddle-like exopodites (upper branch) on the trunk and pygidium limbs along with its small size suggests that it was an effective swimmer with a strong power stroke, and that it probably had a nektobenthic mode of life, swimming close to the ocean floor. Given its delicate spinose endites ( structures projecting from the underside of the limbs) it likely only consumed soft food and organic particles. It is considered to be closely related to Retifacies from the same deposit with shared characters including a segmented tailspine. It has been placed as a member of Artiopoda, possibly along with Retifacies the earliest diverging lineage of the Trilobitomorpha.

Implied weights parsimony phylogeny after Berks et al. 2023.

- Artiopoda
  - - Thulaspis
    - Squamacula
  - - Protosutura
      - Zhiwenia
      - Australimicola
      - Acanthomeridion
    - - Vicissicaudata
        - Sidneyia
        - - Cheloniellida
          - - Emeraldella
            - - Kodymirus
              - - Eozetetes
                - Aglaspidida
      - Trilobitomorpha
        - - Retifacies
          - Pygmaclypeatus
        - - Xandarellida
          - - Nektaspida
            - - Conciliterga
              - - Kwanyinaspis
                - - Phytophilaspis
                  - Trilobita
