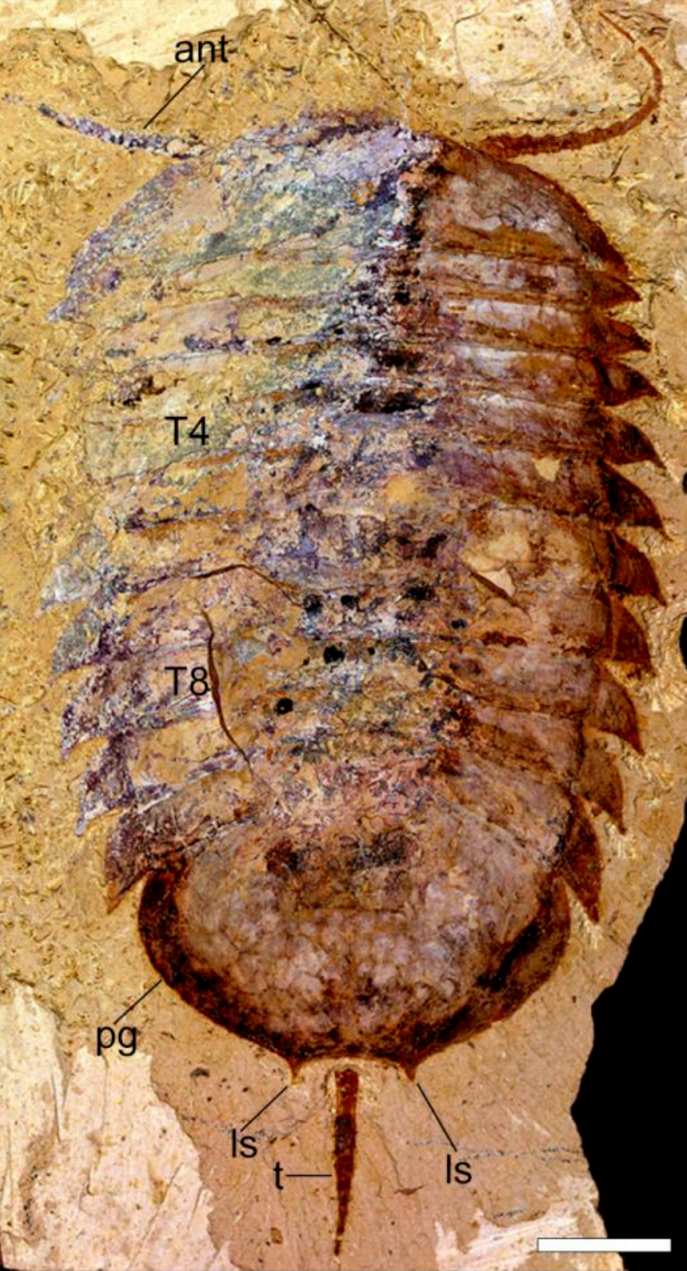
- Fossil of the dorsal carapace

Scientific classification
- Kingdom: Animalia
- Phylum: Arthropoda
- Clade: †Artiopoda
- Subphylum: †Trilobitomorpha
- Genus: †Retifacies; Hou et al. 1989
- Species: †R. abnormalis

Binomial name
- †Retifacies abnormalis Hou et al. 1989

= Retifacies =

Retifacies Temporal range: Cambrian Stage 3, 518 Ma

Extinct genus of arthropod

Retifacies abnormalis is an extinct arthropod that lived in the lower Cambrian (about 518 million years ago). Its fossil remains have been found in the Maotianshan Shales of Yunnan, China. It is a member of the Artiopoda, and closely related to Pygmaclypeatus.

== Description ==
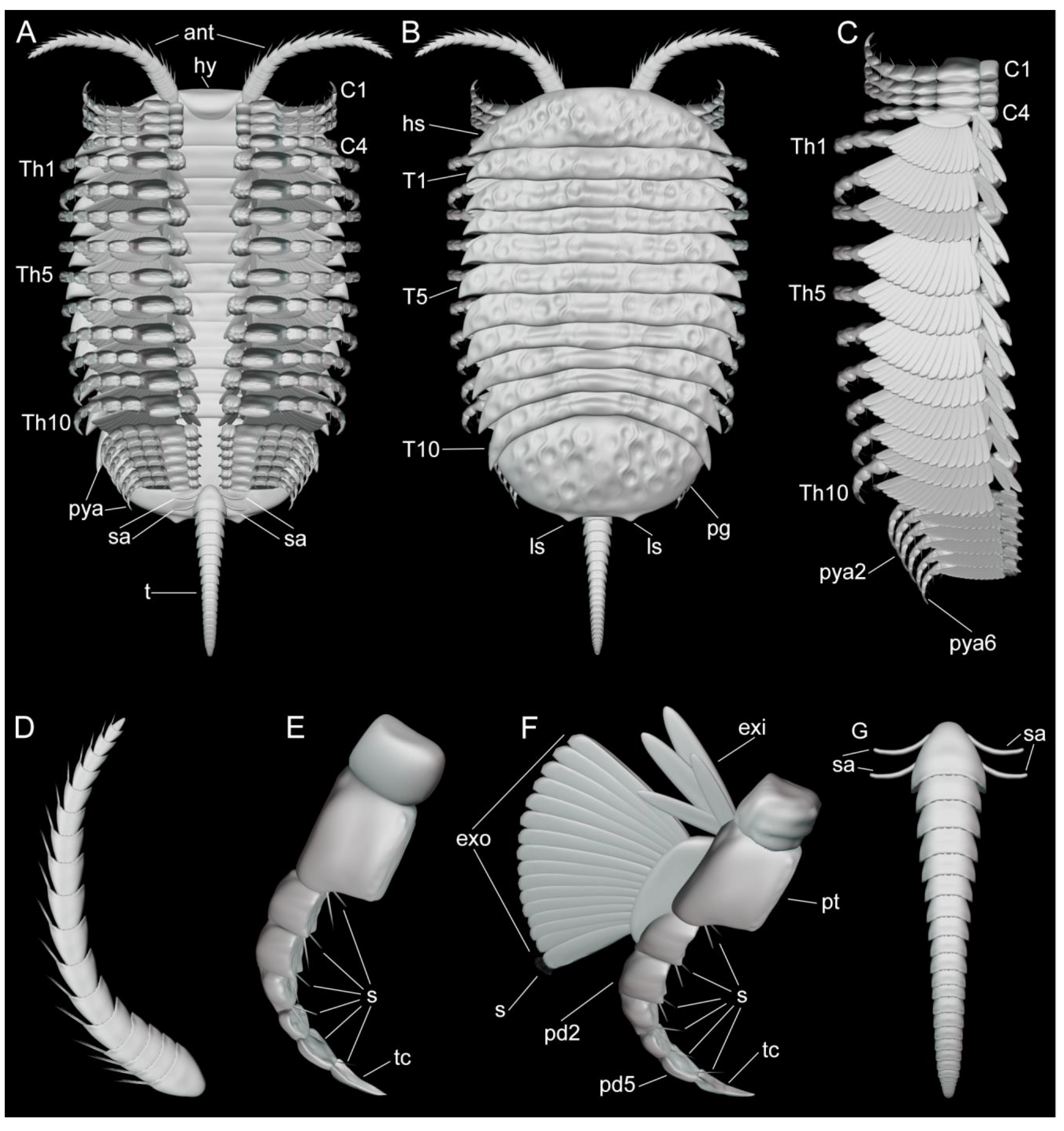
Reconstruction in various views. E=uniramous cephalic appendages F=biramous appendages Key: exopod (exo) exite (exi) protopodite (pt) podomere (pd) spine/setae (s) terminal claw (tc)

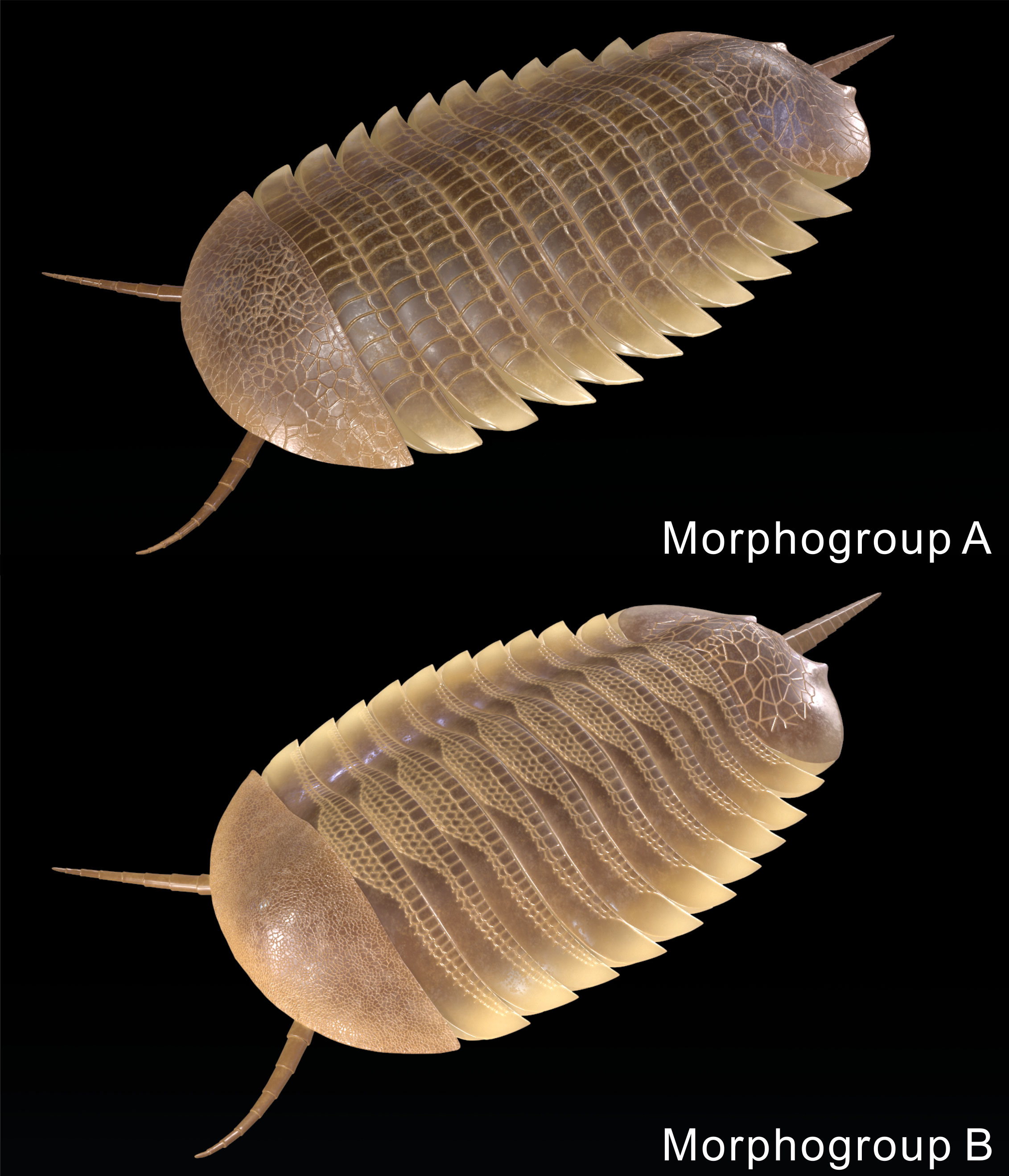
Two life restorations showing variation in carapace ornamentation

Retifacies was relatively large sized, reaching a carapace length of 35 centimetres (1.15 ft), and a total length of 55 centimetres (1.80 ft), including the extended antennae and tailspine. The head shield was broad and short, and appears to have lacked eyes. The antennae had 17 segments, which telescoped into each other, with spines present on the underside of the antennae at the boundary between the segments. Also present on the head were four closely spaced pairs of appendages, the first three of which were uniramous (single branched), while the last was biramous (two branched). The three uniramous appendages had six segments (podomeres), each ending with a terminal claw, with the endopod (lower leg-like branch) of the fourth biramous limb having a similar morphology. The trunk was divided up into 10 segments (tergites), all of approximately equal length and width, each of which were associated with pairs of biramous appendages. The endopods of these limbs had 5/6 podomeres with terminal claws, while the exopod (upper limb branch) comprised a semicircular lobe that bore over 12 paddle-shaped lamellae, the last of which bore setae (hair-like structures) at its edge. These limbs also bore exites, consisting of lamellae borne from the basal segment (basipod) of the appendage. The pygidium segment at the end of the body was proportionally large, and bore 5-6 pairs of biramous appendages. The segmented tailspine emerged from the underside of the pygidium. The carapace was covered in polygonal reticulated (net-like) ornamentation, which varied between specimens, corresponding to two morphotypes. Due to one morphotype only being found among the largest specimens the differences may be due to ontogeny.

== Lifestyle ==
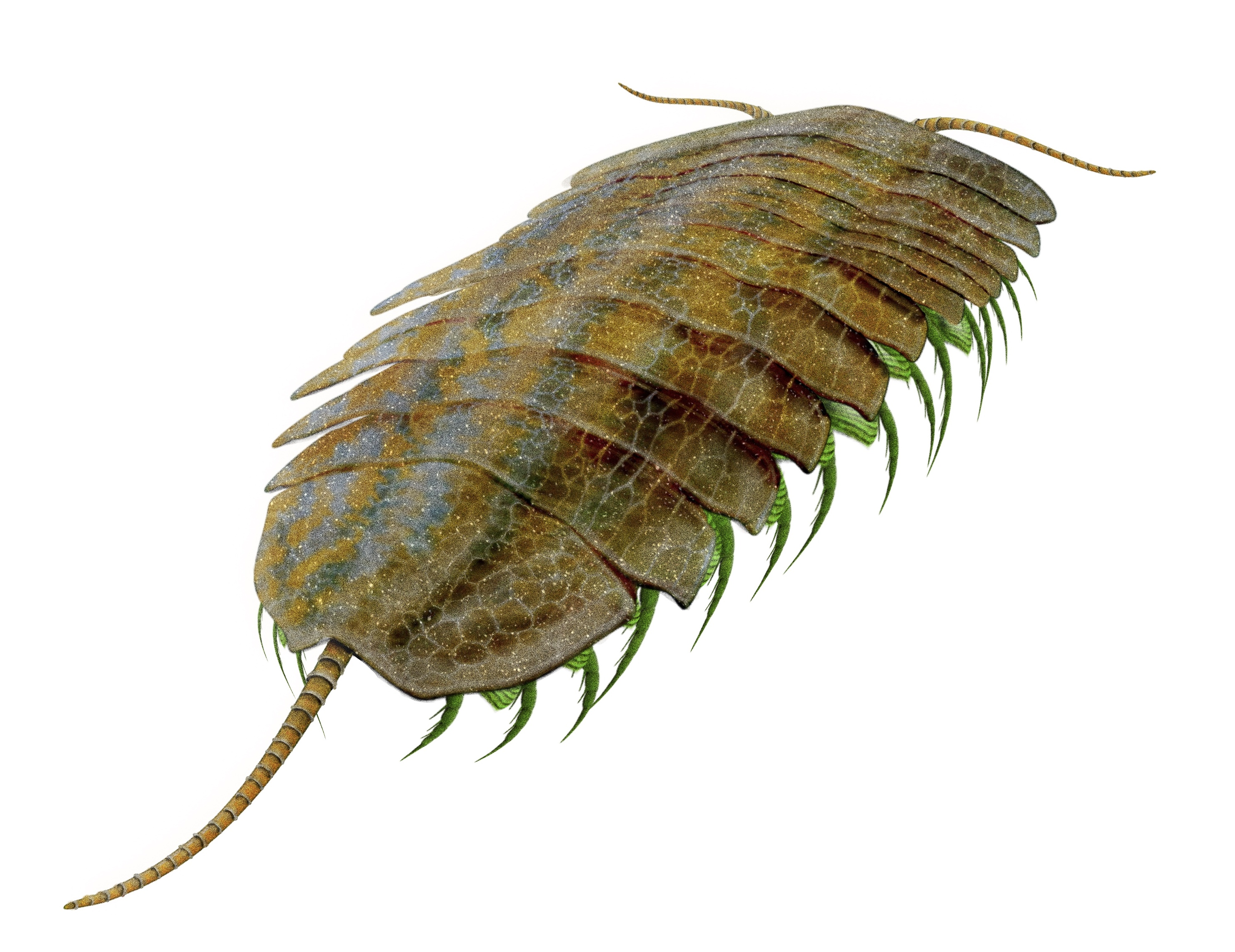
Life restoration

Due to a lack of information about the gut morphology or contents, the reconstruction of the ecology of Retifacies is speculative. The authors of the 2022 redescription suggested that Retifacies was a benthic organism (living on the seafloor) that scavenged on the remains of soft-bodied organisms or organic matter.

== Classification ==
The vaguely similar appearance to that of a trilobite originally led scholars to think that Retifacies was a possible relative of Helmetia or Naraoia, two other primitive arthropods related to trilobites (Delle Cave and Simonetta 1991, Hou and Bergstrom 1997). Subsequently, another study on showed how Retifacies was related to other basal arthropods, as Emeraldella and Sidneyia, from the Burgess Shale in Canada, as part of Artiopoda, a placement that has been confirmed in subsequent studies. Hou and Bergstrom suggested a close relationship to the genus Squamacula. However, after a redescription of both Retifacies and Pygmaclypeatus from the same deposit in 2022, the latter is considered to be Retifacies closest known relative, based on the fact that both taxa share a multi-segmented tailspine, among other morphological similarities, with a close relation to Squamacula being rejected. The clade containing Retifacies+Pygmaclypeatus was either classified in Trilobitomorpha, or in a more basal position within Artiopoda.

Implied weights parsimony phylogeny after Berks et al. 2023.

- Artiopoda
  - - Thulaspis
    - Squamacula
  - - Protosutura
      - Zhiwenia
      - Australimicola
      - Acanthomeridion
    - - Vicissicaudata
        - Sidneyia
        - - Cheloniellida
          - - Emeraldella
            - - Kodymirus
              - - Eozetetes
                - Aglaspidida
      - Trilobitomorpha
        - - Retifacies
          - Pygmaclypeatus
        - - Xandarellida
          - - Nektaspida
            - - Conciliterga
              - - Kwanyinaspis
                - - Phytophilaspis
                  - Trilobita

== Sources ==
- Hou, Chen & Lu, 1989. Early Cambrian new arthropods from Chengjiang, Yunnan. Acta Palaeontologica Sinica, 28, 42–57.
- Chen & Zhou, 1997. Biology of the Chengjiang fauna. Bulletin of the Natural Museum of Natural Science, 10, 11 – 106.
- Hou & Bergstrom, 1997. Arthropods of the Lower Cambrian Chengjiang fauna, southwest China. Fossils and strata, 45, 116 pp.
- Edgecombe & Ramskold, 1999b. Relationships of Cambrian Arachnata and the systematic position of Trilobita. Journal of Paleontology, 73, 263 – 287.
- Hou, Bergstrom, Wang, Feng & Chen, 1999. The Chengjiang fauna. Exceptionally well-preserved animals from 530 million years ago. 170 pp. Yunnan Science and Technology Press, Kunming, Yunnan Province, China.
