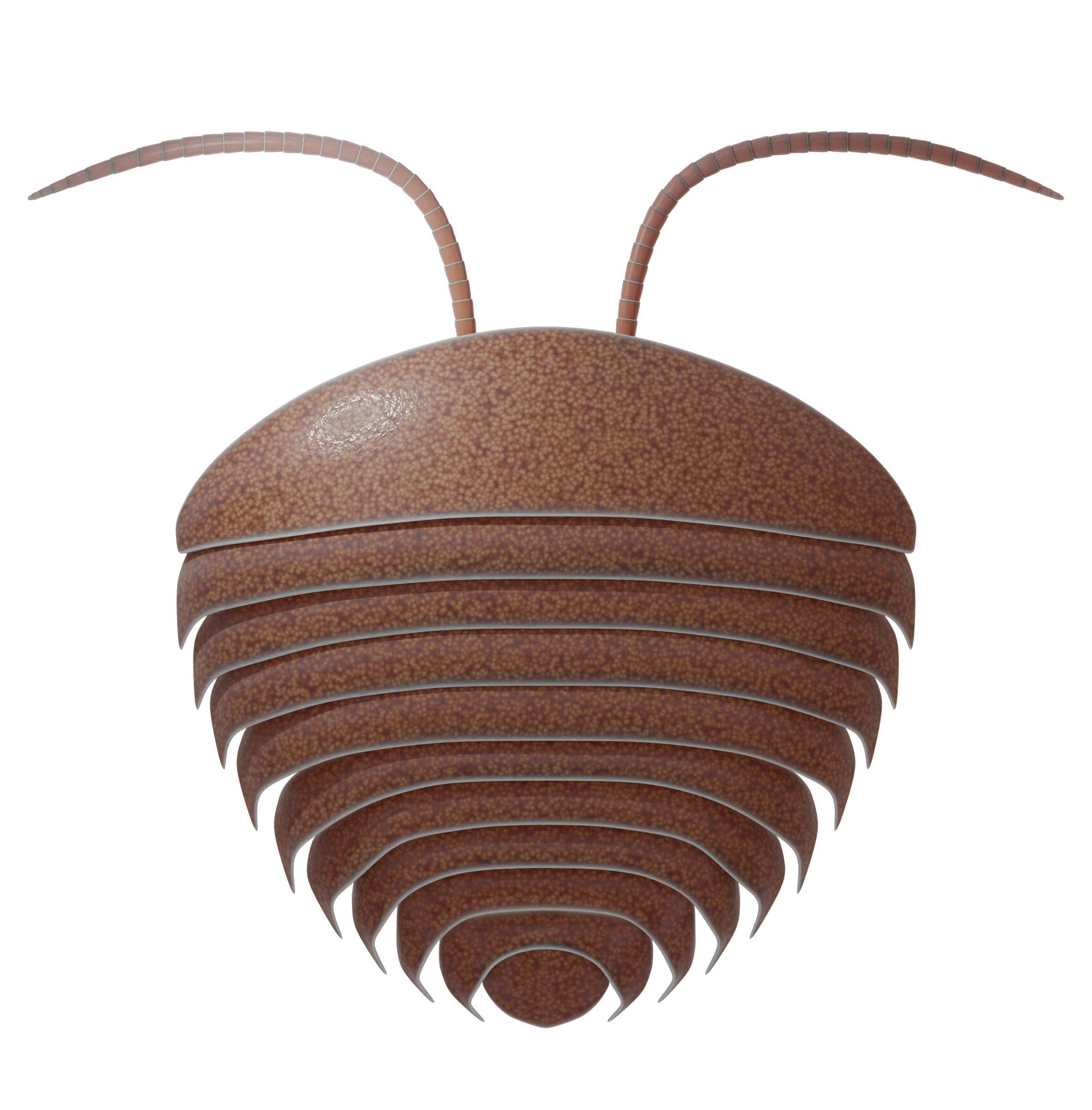
- Reconstruction of Squamacula clypeata

Scientific classification
- Kingdom: Animalia
- Phylum: Arthropoda
- Clade: †Artiopoda
- Genus: †Squamacula; Hou and Bergström, 1997

Type species
- †Squamacula clypeata Hou and Bergström, 1997

Species
- †Squamacula clypeata Hou and Bergström, 1997; †Squamacula buckorum Paterson et al. 2012

= Squamacula =

Squamacula Temporal range: Cambrian Series 2

Extinct genus of arthropods

Squamacula is an extinct artiopodan arthropod from the Cambrian Series 2. The type species S. clypeata was described in 1997 from the Chengjiang biota of Yunnan, China. At the time of description there were only two known specimens of S. clypeata, but now there are at least six known specimens. In 2012 a second species S. buckorum was described from the Emu Bay Shale of Australia.

== Etymology ==
The genus Squamacula is derived from the Latin word squama, meaning scale, and the diminutive suffix -culus, indicating that the animal is relatively small. The species clypeata is derived from the Latin word clypeatus, meaning shield-shaped. It was named this in reference to its shield-like outline.

== Description ==
Squamacula clypeata is flattened (dorsoventrally). It has 11 segments in total: the cephalon (the head), nine thoracic tergites (each of which covers a somite), and one pygidium. It has a doublure, a piece of exoskeleton that covers part of the underside of the animal. Its doublure is, on average, about twice as long as the length of its cephalon. It has been hypothesized that this large doublure could have aided the animal in digging through sediment to find food, as it was thought to have been both a predator of small animals and a scavenger.

Squamacula clypeata has one pair of antennae attached to its cephalon, but no other appendages or auditory or visual structures. No mouth is present in the specimens, but the gut is present, so S. clypeata must have had a mouth, which is thought to have been between the cephalon and doublure on the underside.

Squamacula clypeata has one pair of biramous appendages (an appendage which branches into two) per thoracic tergite. The endopod (inside branch) has seven segments, the first six of which are roughly even in size and shape, with small spines on the underside, and the last of which terminates with a claw and appears to have been used for walking and eating, as the claw could be useful in grabbing hold of and tearing up food. The exopod (outside branch) was not segmented, but flap-like, with setae (bristles) near the tip, which may have been used for both locomotion and respiration.

S. buckorum differs from S. clypeata in that it has 11 thoracic tergites, which appear to exhibit less overlap that those of S. clypeata, though the differences between the two species are relatively minor. The species also preserves elements of the gut tract not preserved in S. clypeata, which show that it was narrow annulated tube running along the midline of the animal, with three or possibly four pairs of midgut glands within the cephalic shield, with other gland pairs extending along the trunk.

== Taxonomy ==
In phylogenetic analyses, Squamacula has consistently been placed as the earliest diverging and most primitive member of Artiopoda, a clade that includes trilobites and a variety of morphologically similar soft-bodied forms. A close relationship has been proposed with the genus Thulaspis from the Sirius Passet site of Greenland.

Implied weights parsimony phylogeny after Berks et al. 2023.

- Artiopoda
  - - Thulaspis
    - Squamacula
  - - Protosutura
      - Zhiwenia
      - Australimicola
      - Acanthomeridion
    - - Vicissicaudata
        - Sidneyia
        - - Cheloniellida
          - - Emeraldella
            - - Kodymirus
              - - Eozetetes
                - Aglaspidida
      - Trilobitomorpha
        - - Retifacies
          - Pygmaclypeatus
        - - Xandarellida
          - - Nektaspida
            - - Conciliterga
              - - Kwanyinaspis
                - - Phytophilaspis
                  - Trilobita
