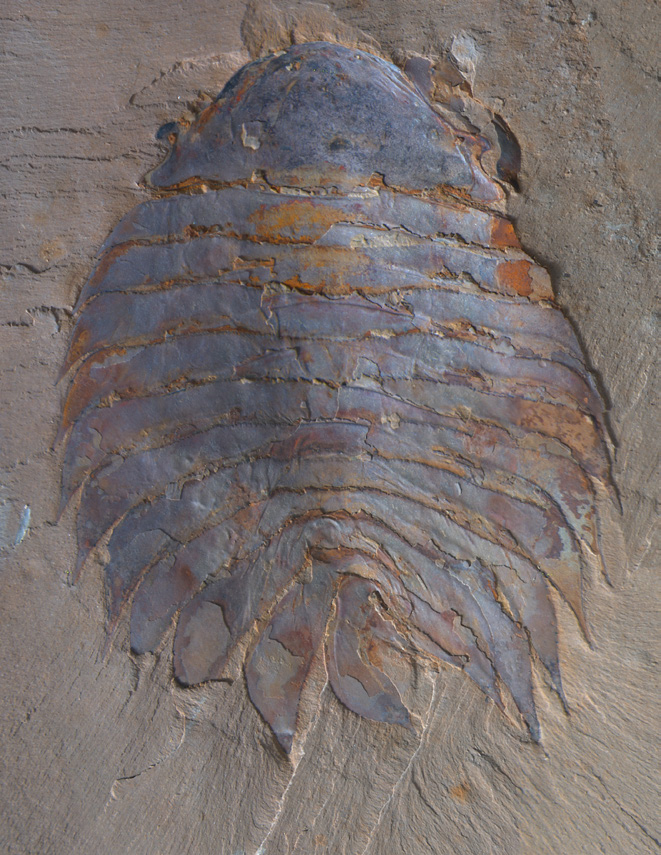
- CJHMD 00053b, a mature adult specimen

Scientific classification
- Kingdom: Animalia
- Phylum: Arthropoda
- Clade: †Artiopoda
- (unranked): †Protosutura
- Family: †Acanthomeridiidae; Hou & Bergström, 1997
- Genus: †Acanthomeridion; Hou, Chen & Lu, 1989

Type species
- Acanthomeridion serratum Hou, Chen & Lu, 1989

Synonyms
- Acanthomeridion anacanthus Hou et al., 2016

= Acanthomeridion =

Acanthomeridion Temporal range: Cambrian Stage 3, 518 Ma

Extinct genus of Cambrian Arthropod

Acanthomeridion is an extinct arthropod found in the Cambrian Stage 3 aged Chengjiang biota deposits of Yunnan, China. It is a member of Artiopoda, placing it as a close relative of trilobites.

== Morphology ==
Diagram of Acanthomeridion from a 2024 study, viewed from above (left) and below (right).

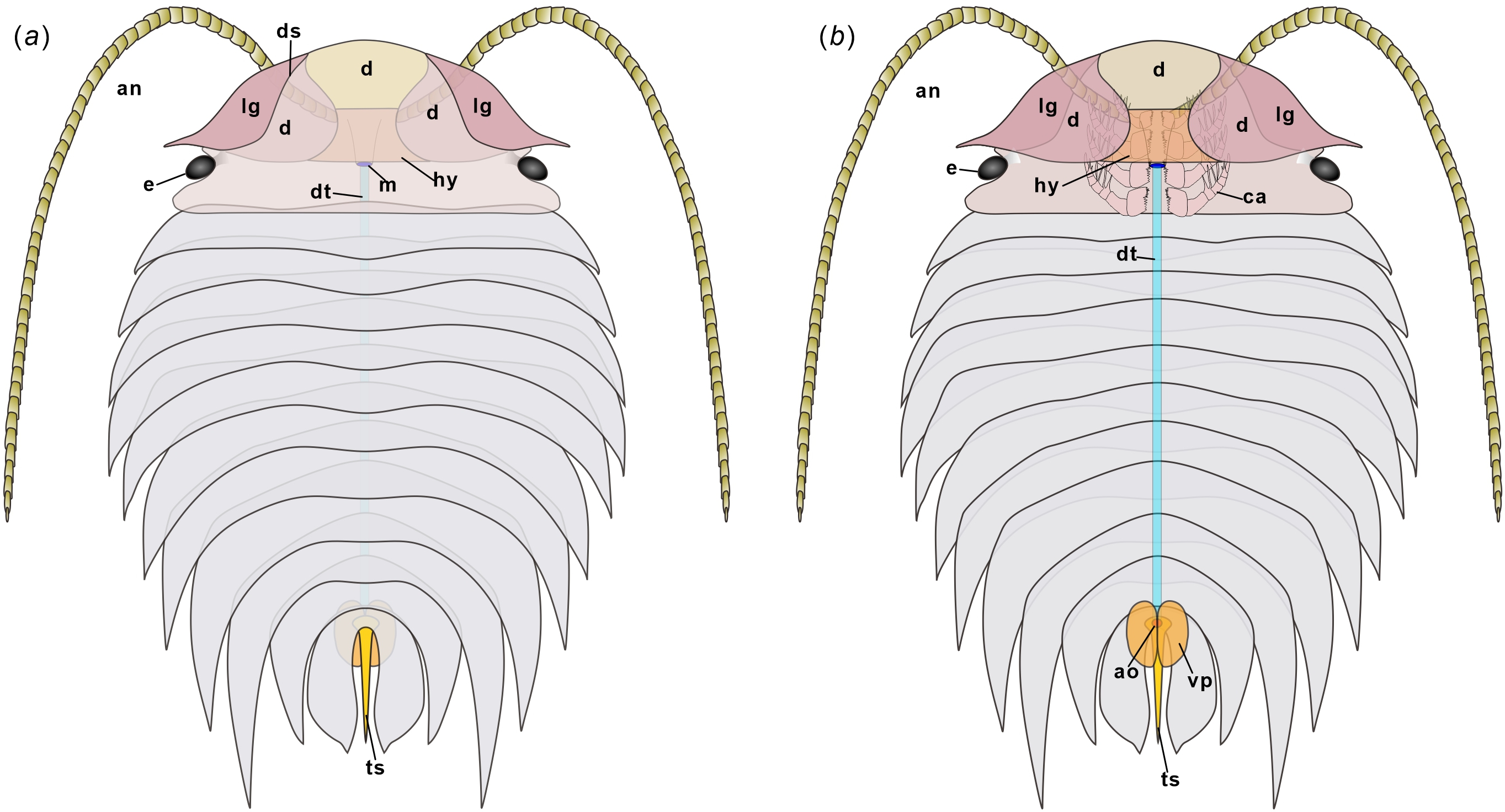
Diagram from 2026 study viewed top down (left) and from below (right) key: an, antennula; ao, anus opening; ca, cephalic appendage; d, doublure; ds, dorsal ecdysial suture; dt, digestive tract; e, lateral eye; hy, hypostome; lg, librigena; m, mouth; ts, telson spine; vp, postero-ventral plate.

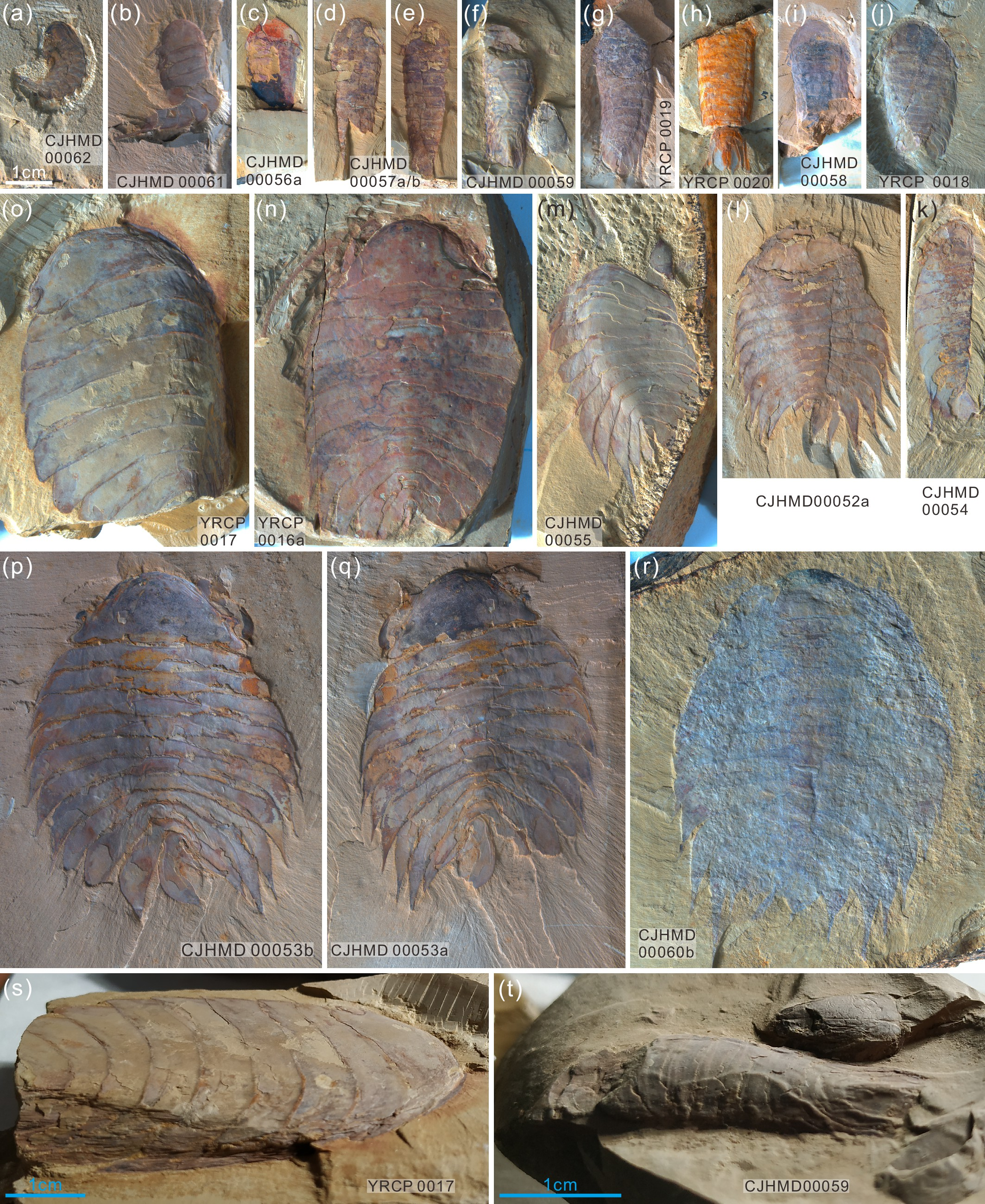
Growth series of Acanthomeridion, showing ontogenetic body shape change over the course of growth.

Specimens of Acanthomeridion range in length from 2 to 7.5 centimetres (0.79 to 2.95 in) measured along the midline (sagittal plane). The exoskeleton was unmineralised. The head shield was roughly triangular in shape, rounded towards the front. A pair of compound eyes were accommodated by notches at the posterior edge of the head shield. A 2026 study suggested the eyes were stalked. Over the course of growth, the head became proportionally wider relative to body length.

The head shield was composed of several components, including a main central plate, as well as two bow-shaped plates on the lateral (outwards to the sides) edge of the head, which are suggested to be homologous to the librigena of trilobites, which wrapped around the underside and top surface of the headshield, with their outer posterior edges forming a pair of spines projecting backwards from the head. These plates are suggested to have split from the rest of the skeleton during ecdysis (moulting), like in trilobites. The mouth region had an axe-shaped hypostome. The head bore five pairs of appendages, including a pair of antennae with at least 43 segments, with these segments becoming narrower and shorter towards the tip of the antennae. The four posterior head appendages consisted of a endopod (leg-like branch) with 7 podomeres/segments, which tapered towards their ends. Podomeres 3, 4 and 6 of these limbs bear elongate endites (structures projecting from the underside of the limb), with the seventh final podomere ending in a claw. The basal segment of these limbs formed a gnathobasic apparatus (gnathobasipod) used for processing food, with strongly sclerotised (hardened) teeth/spines facing towards each other.

The trunk is made of eleven segments/tergites, which curve into a spine shape towards their outer edges. During growth, the trunk transitioned from being proportionally narrow as well as being noticeably convex (curved upwards) in young individuals, towards being more broad and flatter in mature individuals. One specimen indicates specimens of Acanthomeridion had paired gut diverticula within the body cavity. Each tergite/segment is associated with a pair of biramous (two branched) appendages, which are all similar in size and morphology. Like the head limbs, the basal segment of the limbs (protopodite) had well developed spines facing towards the midline of the animal, forming a gnathobasic apparatus for processing food, with the underside of the protopodite also bearing longer endite spines. The exopods (upper limb branch) are slender, rod-like and elongate, though not exceeding the breadth of the trunk carapace. These exopods are covered in two rows of short lamellae. The endopods (lower, leg-like branches), were made of up seven segments/podomeres each of trapezoidal shape. The first six of these segments bore endite spines arranged in rows on their undersides, with the number of rows gradually decreasing towards the tip of the limbs. The ends of the endopods on the final seventh podomere/segment bore a claw composed of three spines. The final body segment terminated with a slender telson spine. The underside of the end of the body is suggested to have borne a pair of oval shaped plates.

== Taxonomy ==
Acanthomeridion and the species Acanthomeridion serratum was first described by Hou, Chen and Liu in 1989. In 1997, it was placed in its own, monotypic family, Acanthomeridiidae. In 2016, a second species Acanthomeridion anacanthus, was described by Hou et al. Until 2024 the morphology of the limbs of Acanthomeridion was unknown. In that year, a comprehensive redescription of the genus was published by Du et al. This study considered A. anacanthus to be a junior synonym of Acanthomeridion serratum, making the genus again monotypic.

Early studies suggested an affinity with Xandarellida (also known as Petalopleura) for Acanthomeridion. However, Hou et al. 2016, found Acanthomeridion to be a basal (early branching) member of Artiopoda, the clade containing trilobites and their close relatives, including Xandarellida (which was found to not be particularly closely related to Acanthomeridion). A 2019 study placed Acanthomeridion in the newly named clade Protosutura alongside Zhiwenia, also known from the Cambrian of China, and Australimicola from the Cambrian of Australia, based on the shared presence of dorsal ecdysial sutures (areas of the upper surface of the head shield where the exoskeleton splits during moulting/ecdysis). This group was again placed as basal (early branching) members of Artiopoda. The 2024 redescription noted striking similarities of the head organisation of Acanthomeridion in particular to trilobites, and proposed that this may suggest an especially close relationship between the two groups within the Artiopoda, though the authors alternatively suggested that these similarities may be due to convergence, and that its placement within Artiopoda could not be precisely determined due to this uncertainty. A later 2025 study again supported its position as closely related to Zhiwenia and Australimicola near the base of Artiopoda. A 2026 study by contrast placed Acanthomeridion in Vicissicaudata, as the sister taxon to Sidneyia.

Cladogram following Wu et al. (2025):

- Artiopoda
  - Squamacula
  - - - - Pygmaclypeatus
        - Retifacies
      - Protosutura
        - Australimicola
        - - Zhiwenia
          - Acanthomeridion
    - - Kwanyinaspis
      - - Trilobitomorpha
          - Nektaspida
          - Conciliterga
          - Xandarellida
          - - Phytophilaspis
            - Trilobita
        - Vicissicaudata
          - Sidneyia
          - - Cheloniellida
            - - Emeraldella
              - - Kodymirus
                - - Eozetetes
                  - Aglaspidida

Cladogram after Yang et al. 2026.

- Artiopoda
  - - Zhiwenia
    - Xandarellida
  - - Trilobitomorpha
      - Nektaspida
      - - Trilobita
        - Conciliterga
    - Vicissicaudata
      - Cheloniellida
      - - Aglaspidida
        - - Emeraldella
          - - Sidneyia
            - Acanthomeridion

== Ecology ==
Acanthomeridion is suggested to have been epibenthic (living on the sediment at the bottom of the water column), it is suggested to have been a durophagous predator, using its spined gnathobasic apparatus on the limbs to dismember prey.
