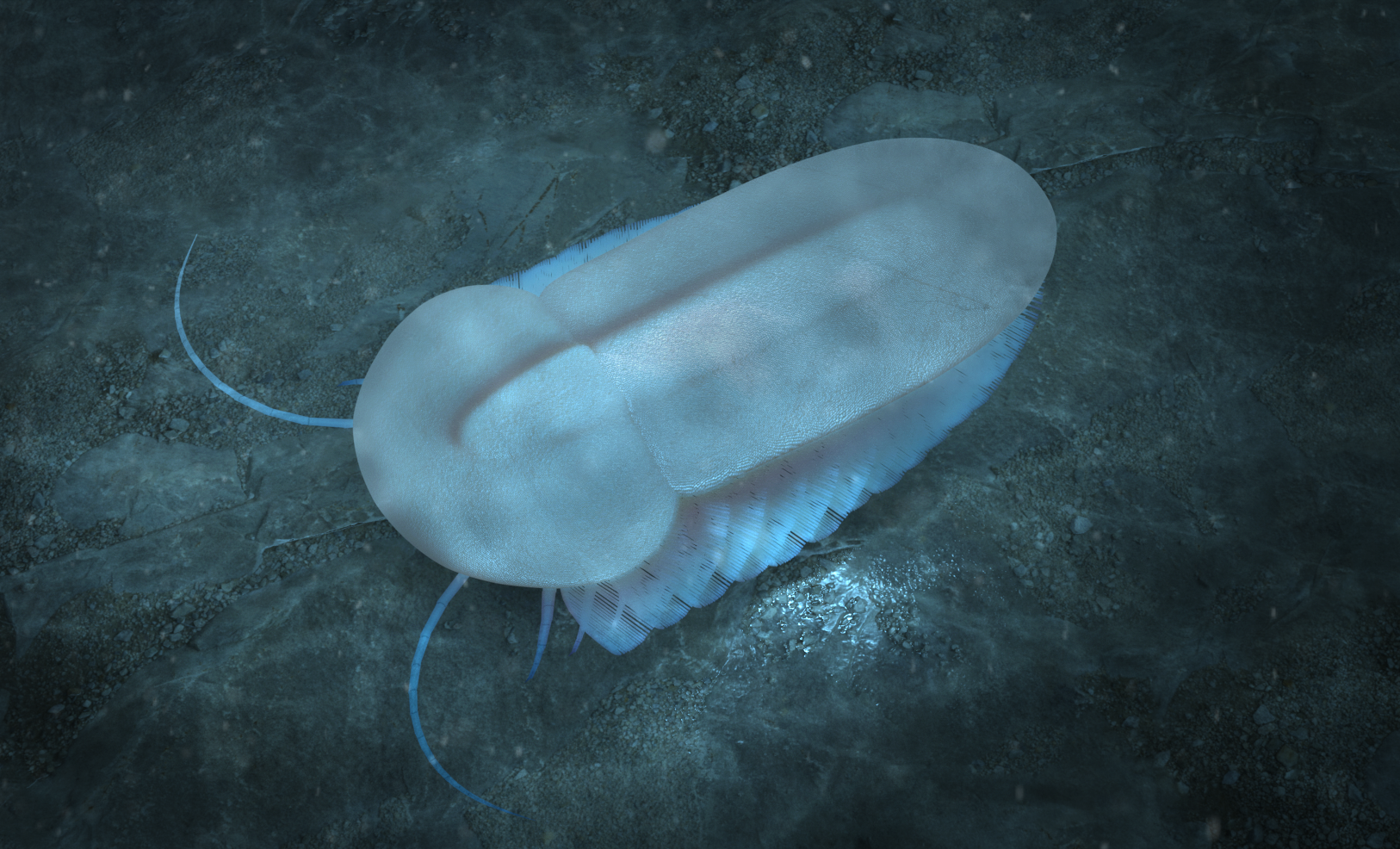
- Misszhouia, a nektaspid
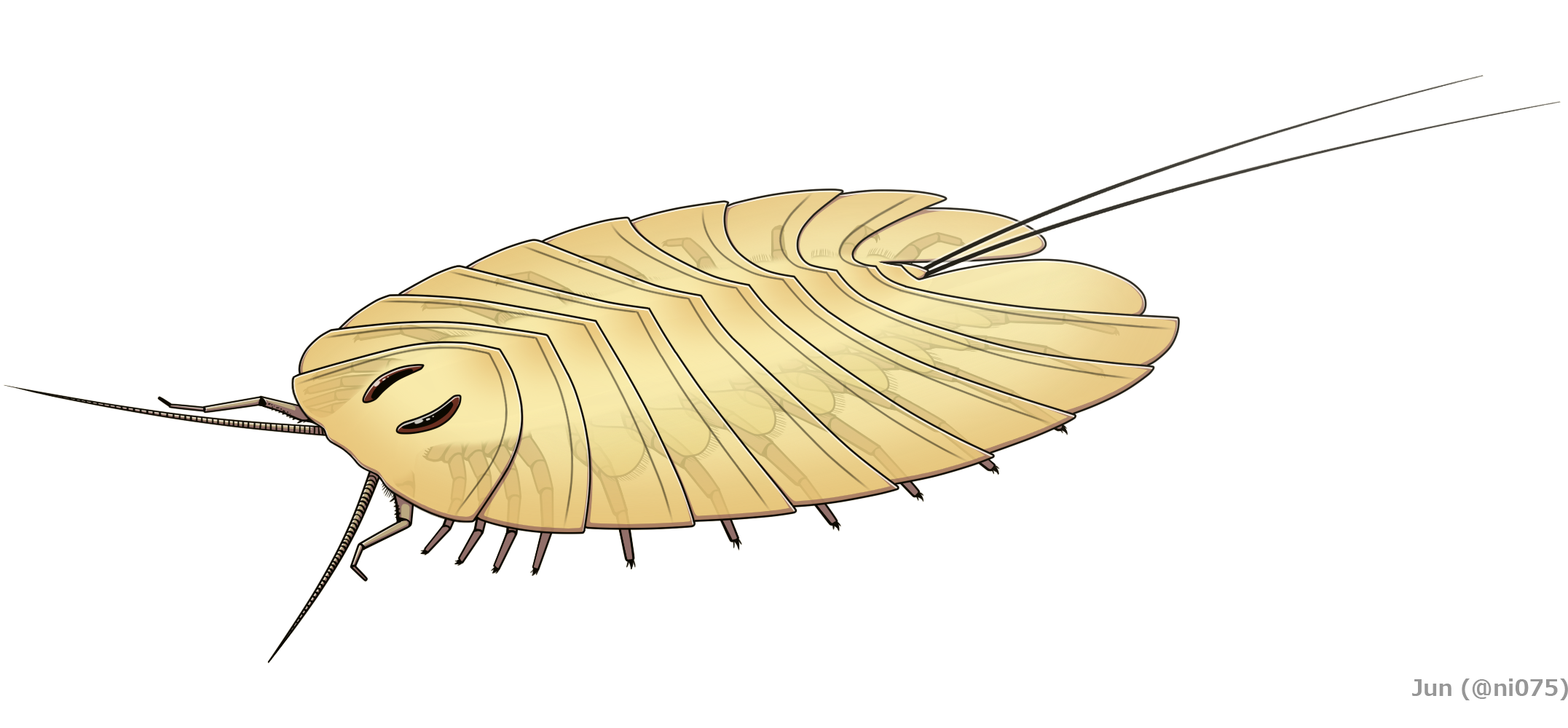
- Cheloniellon, a cheloniellid

Scientific classification
- Kingdom: Animalia
- Phylum: Arthropoda
- Clade: Deuteropoda
- Clade: †Artiopoda; Hou and Bergstrom, 1997

Subgroups
- †Siriocaris?; †Squamacula; †Thulaspis; †Urokodia; †Falcatamacaris; †Molaria; †Bailongia; †Notchia?; †Strabopida?; †Protosutura; †Acanthomeridion; †Zhiwenia; †Australimicola; †Trilobitomorpha; †Retifacies?; †Pygmaclypeatus?; †Campanamuta?; †Kwanyinaspis; †Arthroaspis; †Tonglaiia; †Nektaspida; †Trilobita; †Agnostida?(Traditionally included within Trilobita); †Conciliterga; †Xandarellida (=Petalopleura); †Vicissicaudata; †Sidneyia; †Emeraldella; †Etainia; †Kodymirus; †Eozetetes; †Tardisia; †Carimersa; †Cheloniellida; †Aglaspidida

= Artiopoda =

Artiopoda Temporal range: Early Cambrian - Late Permian

Group of extinct arthropods

Artiopoda is a clade of extinct arthropods that includes trilobites and their close relatives. It was erected by Hou and Bergström in 1997 to encompass a wide diversity of arthropods that would traditionally have been assigned to the Trilobitomorpha. Trilobites, in part due to abundance of findings owing to their mineralized exoskeletons, are by far the best recorded, diverse, and long lived members of the clade. Other members, which largely lack mineralised exoskeletons, are known mostly from Cambrian deposits.

== Description ==
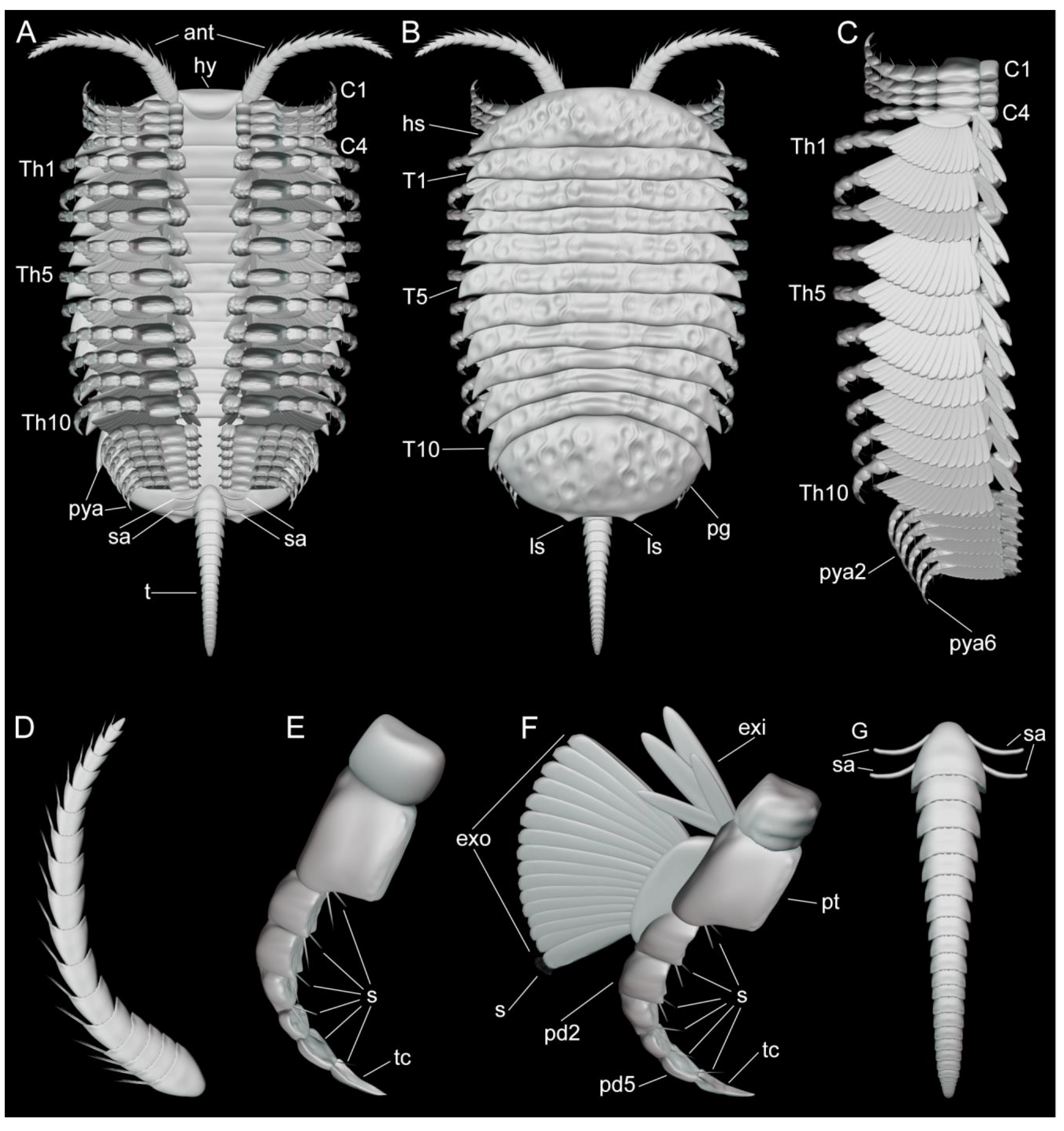
Morphology of Cambrian artiopod Retifacies, showing the morphology of the limbs (E, F) Key for limb morphology: exopod (exo) exite (exi) protopodite (pt) podomere (pd) spine/setae (s) terminal claw (tc)

According to Stein and Selden (2012) artiopods are recognised by the possession of filiform (elongate and relatively thin) antennae, limbs with bilobate exopods (upper branches), with the proximal (closest to base of the limb) lobe being elongate and bearing a lamella, while the distal (further from the limb base) lobe is paddle-shaped and setiforous (bearing hair-or bristle like structures). The limb endopod (inner, leg-like branch) has seven podomeres/segments, with first four podomeres bearing inward facing (endite) structures, while podomeres five and six are stenopodous (cylindrical and stout). Common plesiomorphies (ancestral traits) also include the antennules and at least three sets of post-antennular limbs being attached to the head shield, the postantennular limbs having no or little differentiation into distinct morphologies, and broad paratergal folds which contribute to the dorsoventrally (along the up-down axis) flattened look of artiopods. The limbs of artiopods have also been suggested to bear exites, which were described as similar those of the megacheiran Leanchoilia and probably not homologous to those present in crustaceans.

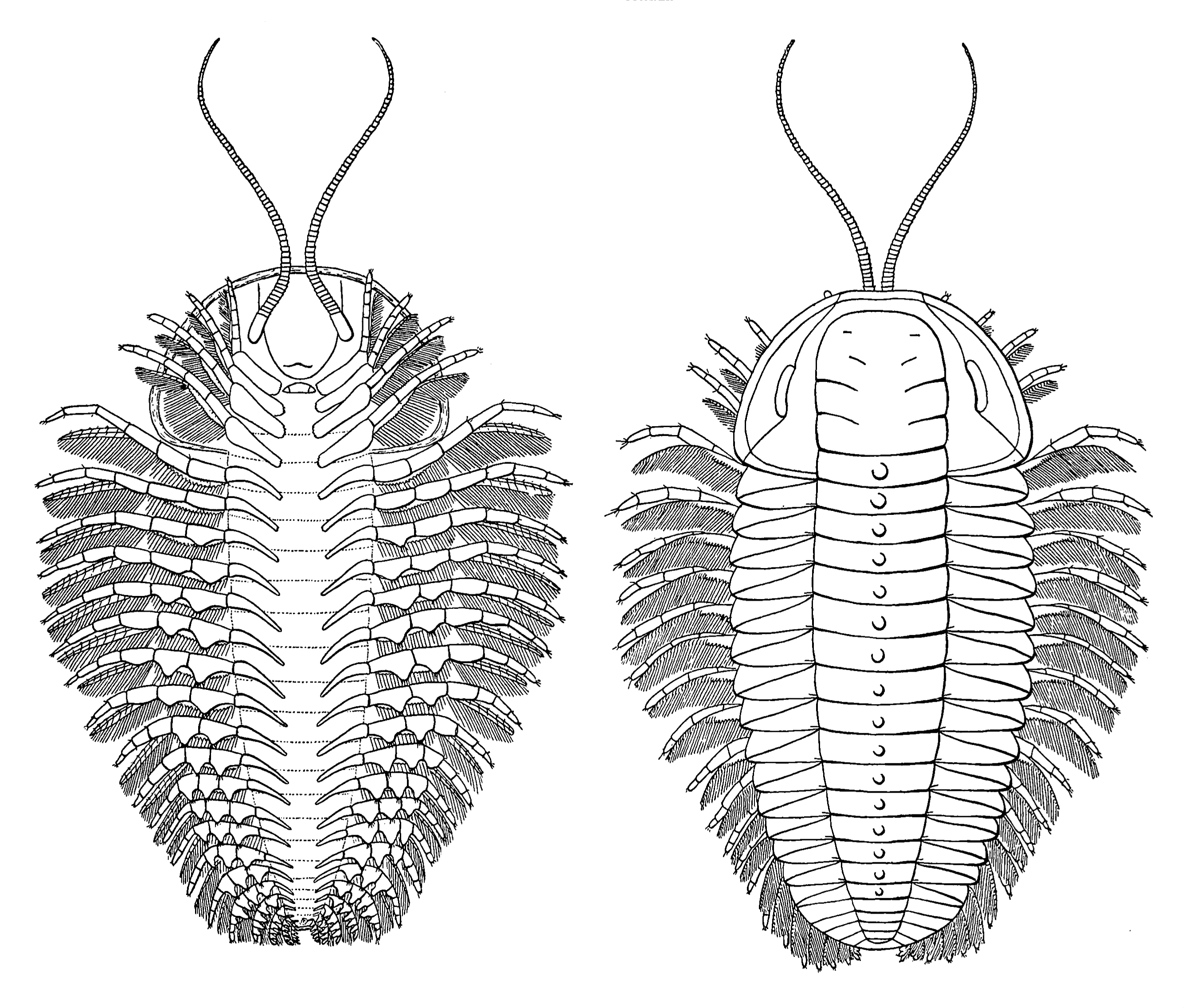
Restoration of the trilobite Triarthrus eatoni

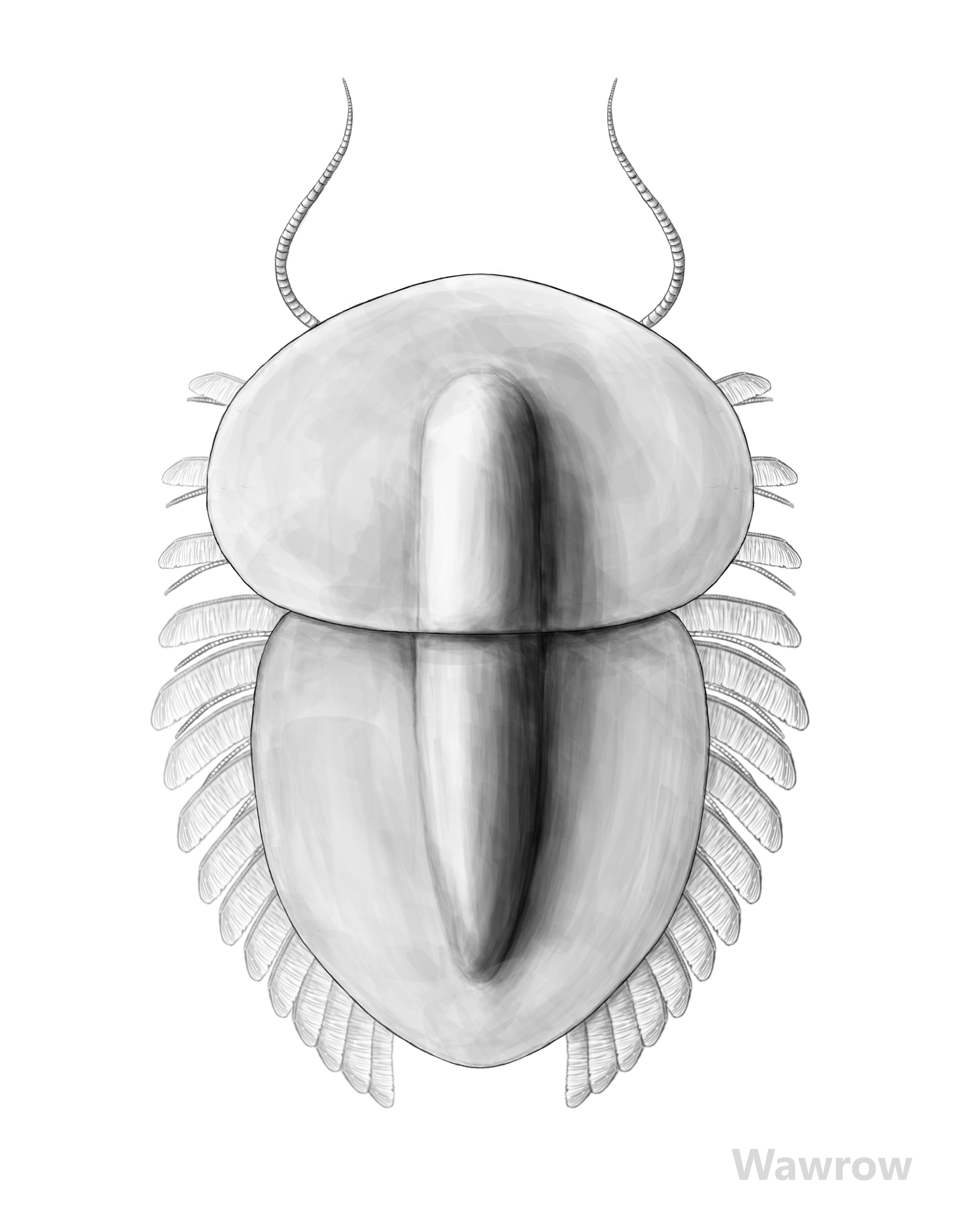
Restoration of Naraoia magna (Nektaspida)

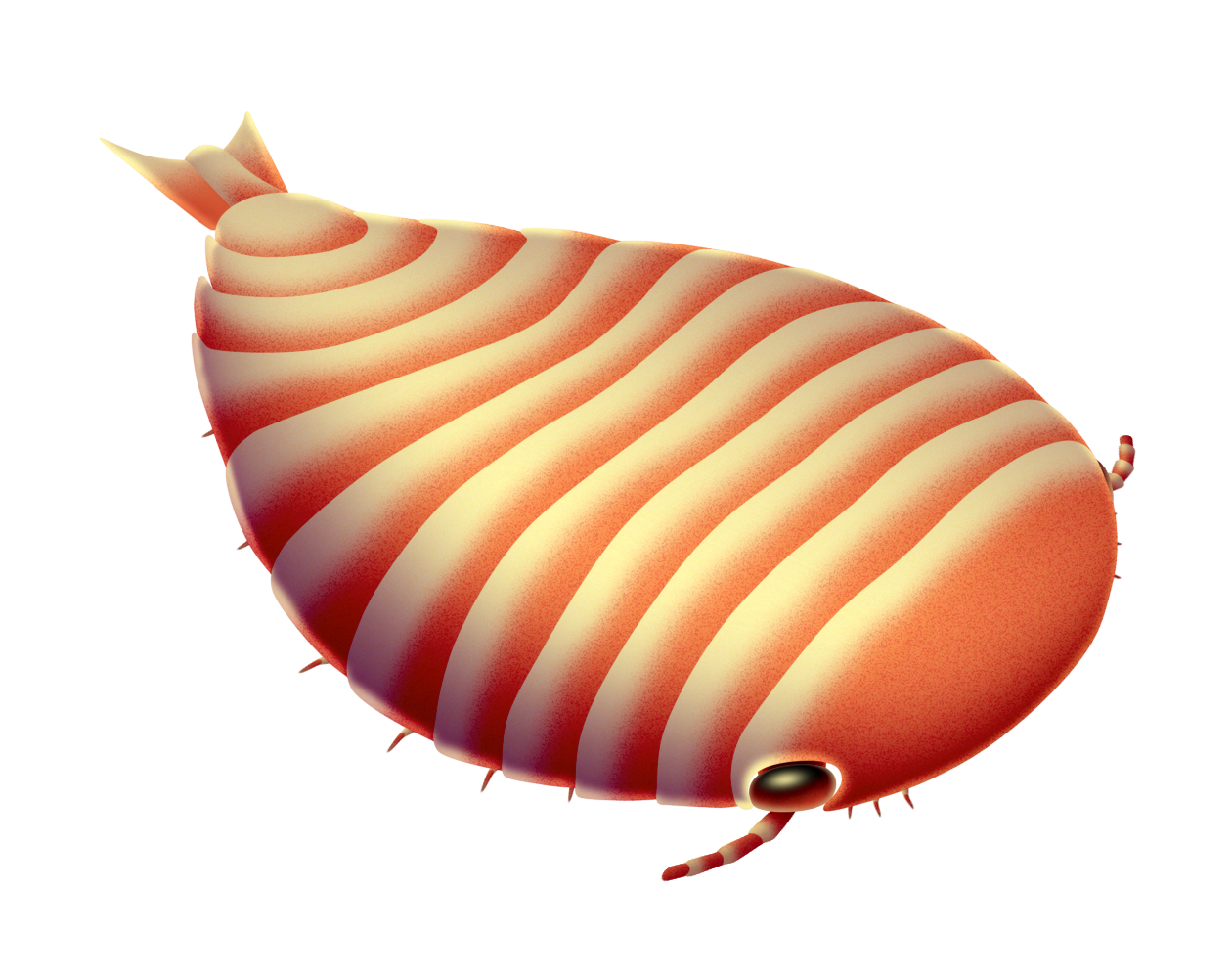
Life restoration of Sidneyia (Vicissicaudata)

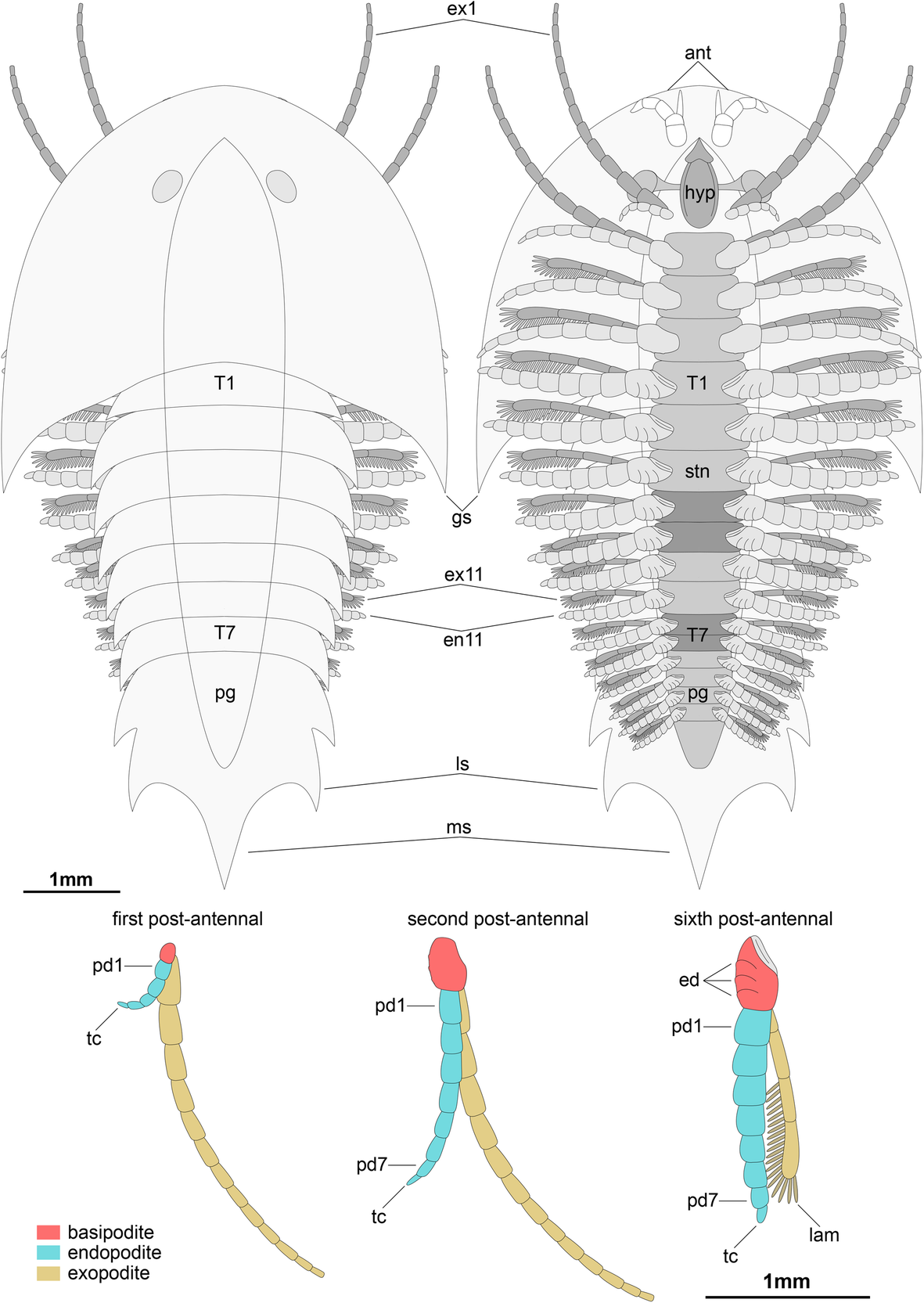
Diagram of Sinoburius (Xandarellida)

Diagram of Olenoides serratus (Trilobita)

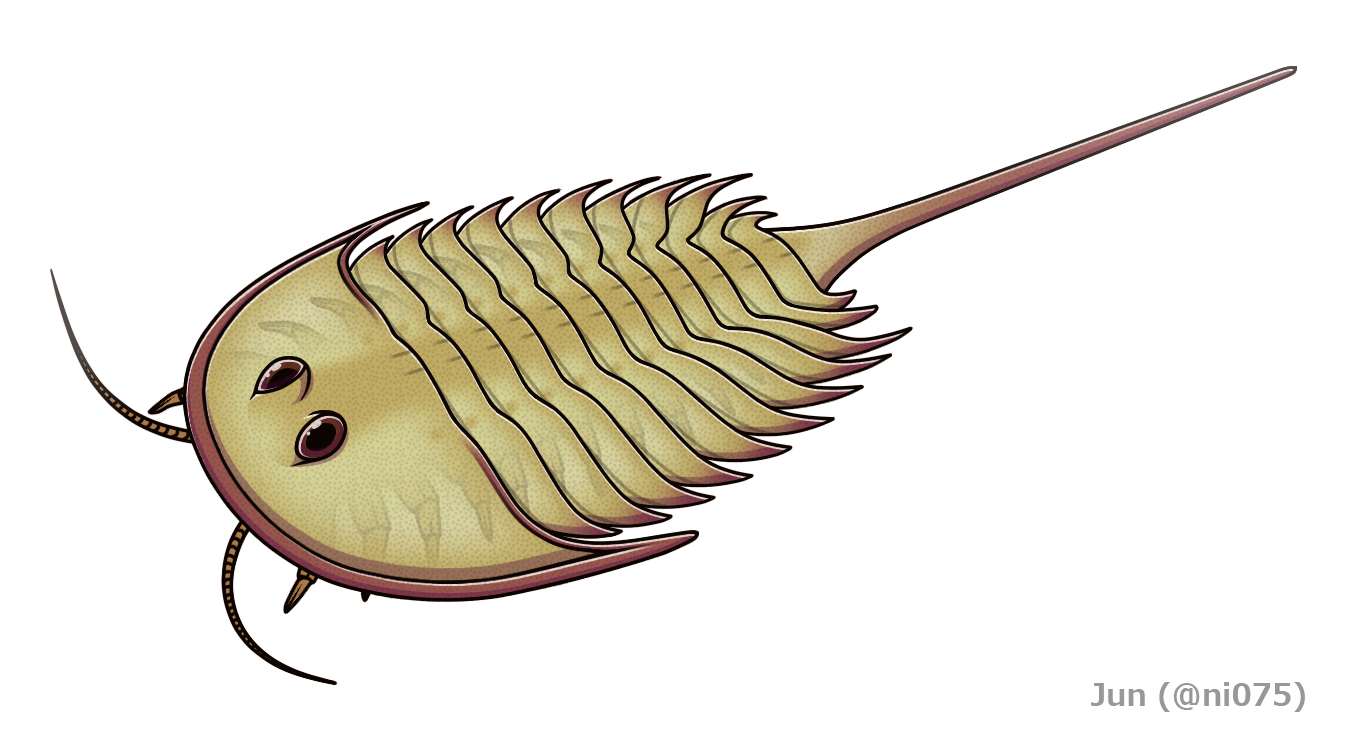
Life restoration of Aglaspis (Aglaspidida)

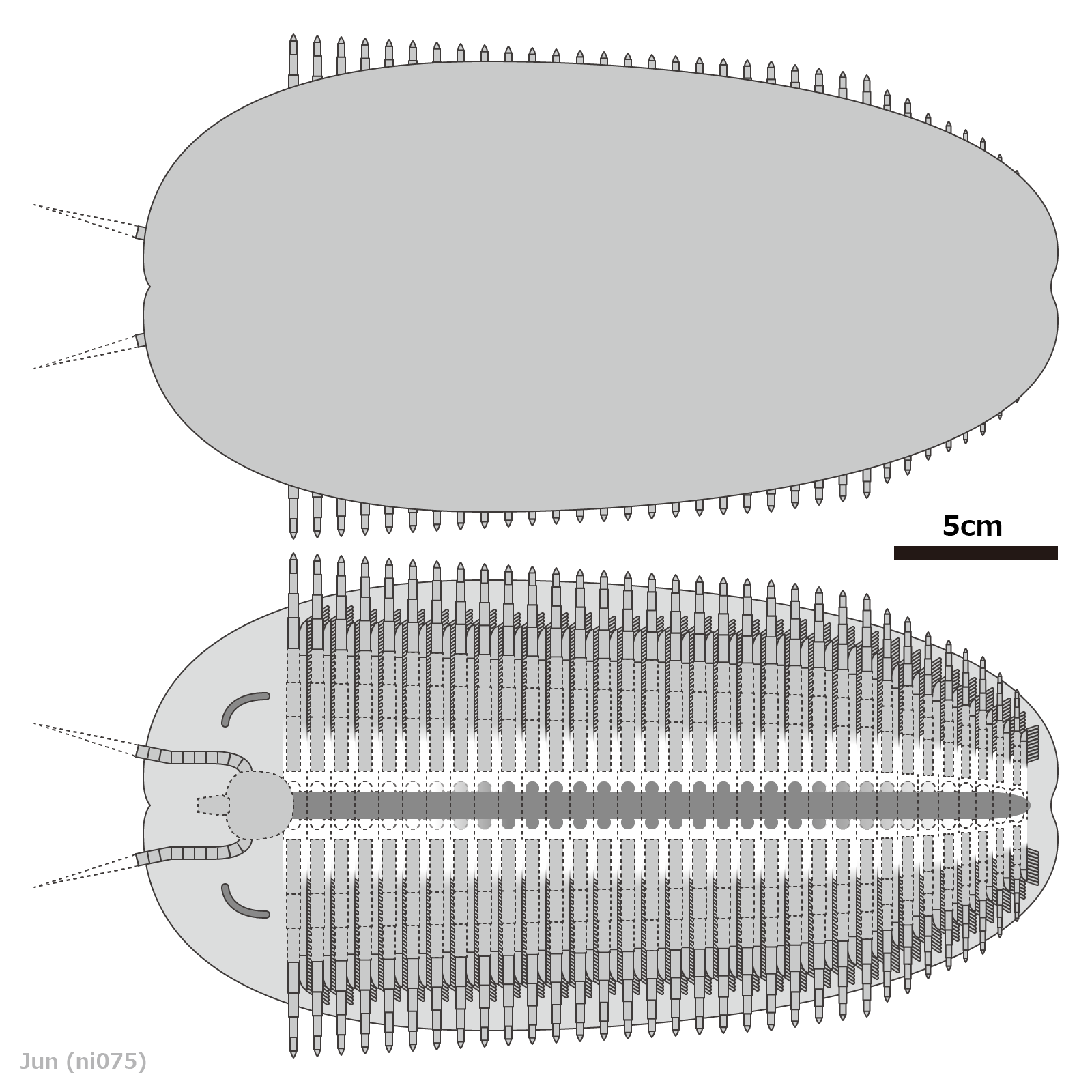
Life restoration of Tegopelte (Conciliterga)

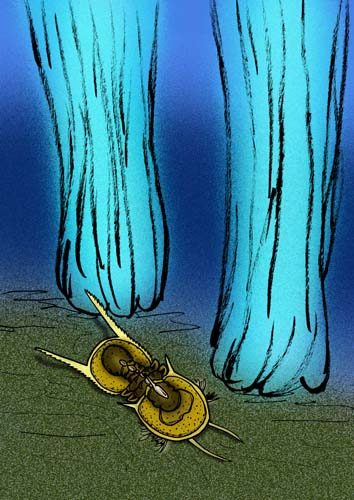
Life restoration of Pleuroctenium (Agnostida)

== Taxonomy ==
=== Internal taxonomy ===
The Artiopoda have been considered by many studies to consist of two major clades; one reusing Trilobitomorpha to encompass trilobites, nektaspids, concilitergans and xandarellids, and the other called Vicissicaudata encompassing aglaspidids, xenopods and cheloniellids. Trilobitomorpha is united by the fusing of the posterior sections of the trunk into a pygidium, while Vicissicaudata is united by a differentiated limbless posterior section of the trunk, often with the presence of a tailspine.

A small group, Protosutura, comprising Zhiwenia, Acanthomeridion and Australimicola, has been recognised based on the shared presence of simple sutures on the top (dorsal surface) of the carapace where it splits during ecdysis (moulting), and a short tailspine. This group is often placed basal to the Trilobitomorpha-Vicissicaudata split, alongside other taxa like Squamacula. These relationships are not always recovered. Some studies have recovered Artiopoda as non-monophyletic.

=== Relationships with other arthropods ===
The relationship of Artiopoda with the two major clades of modern arthropods, Chelicerata (the group of sea spiders, horseshoe crabs and arachnids such as spiders and scorpions) and Mandibulata (which contains insects, crustaceans, centipedes and millipedes, among others), are unresolved, with some phylogenies recovering Artiopoda as more closely to chelicerates, forming the clade Arachnomorpha, while others recover Artiopoda as more closely related to mandibulates, forming the clade Antennulata. Supporters of a relationship with chelicerates have highlighted shared features of the trunk section, while supporters of the Antennulata hypothesis have noted that the first head appendages of both Artiopoda and Mandibulata are a pair of unbranched antennae (the first head appendages of chelicerates by contrast are the claw or pincer-like chelicerae), which these authors propose is a shared ancestral trait (synapomorphy) of Antennulata.

Some studies place artiopods as stem-group euarthropods, with mandibulates and chelicerates more closely related to each other than either is to Artiopoda, though a majority of studies favour a position within the arthropod crown group for Artiopoda.

Some studies have recovered a close relationship with Marrellomorpha (which like artiopods and mandibulates, have single unbranched antennae as their first head appendages), with the proposed clade including Artiopoda and Marrellomorpha dubbed Lamellipedia, though this relationship is not consistently recovered in analyses. The enigmatic artiopodan-like arthropod Kiisortoqia, which bears large "frontal appendages" has been suggested to be closely related to Artiopoda in some analyses.

=== Phylogeny ===
==== Internal phylogeny ====
After Jiao et al. 2021.

- Artiopoda
  - Squamacula clypeata
  - - Protosutura
      - - Zhiwenia coronata
        - Australimicola spriggi
      - - Acanthomeridion serratum
        - Acanthomeridion anacanthus
    - - Bailongia longicaudata
      - Trilobitomorpha
        - Retifacies abnormalis
        - - - - Kwanyinaspis maotiashanensis
              - Trilobita
                - Olenoides serratus
                - Eoredlichia intermedia
            - Conciliterga
              - Haifengella corona
              - - - Kuamaia lata
                  - Helmetia expansa
                - - Tegopelte gigas
                  - Skioldia aldna
                  - Saperion glumaceum
          - - Xandarellida
              - Cindarella eucalla
              - - Luohuilinella deletres
                - Luohuilinella rarus
                - - Sinoburius lunaris
                  - - Xandarella spectaculum
                    - Phytophilaspis pergamena
            - Nektaspida
              - Buenaspis forteyi
              - - Tariccoia arrusensis
                - Soomaspis splendida
                - Liwia convexa
              - - Naraoia spinosa
                - - Naraoia compacta
                  - Misszhouia longicaudata
      - Vicissicaudata
        - Sidneyia inexpectans
        - - Emeraldella brocki
          - Cheloniellida
            - Cheloniellon calmani
            - - Triopus draboviensis
              - Duslia insignis
          - - Kodymirus vagans
            - - Eozetetes gemmelli
              - Aglaspidida
                - Beckwithia typa
                - - - Chlupacaris dubia
                    - - Quasimodaspis brentsae
                      - - Tremaglaspis unite
                        - - Tremaglaspis vanroyi
                          - Brachyaglaspis singularis
                    - - Cyclopites vulgaris
                      - Australaglaspis stonyensis
                      - - Uarthrus instabilis
                        - Flobertia kochi
                        - - Aglaspella granulifera
                          - - Gogglops ensifer
                            - - Glypharthrus simplex
                              - Aglaspis spinifer
                          - - Chraspedops modesta
                            - - Glypharthrus thomasi
                              - - Glypharthrus trispinicaudatus
                                - Glypharthrus magnoculus

Implied weights parsimony phylogeny after Berks et al. 2023.

- Artiopoda
  - - Thulaspis
    - Squamacula
  - - Protosutura
      - Zhiwenia
      - Australimicola
      - Acanthomeridion
    - - Vicissicaudata
        - Sidneyia
        - - Cheloniellida
          - - Emeraldella
            - - Kodymirus
              - - Eozetetes
                - Aglaspidida
      - Trilobitomorpha
        - - Retifacies
          - Pygmaclypeatus
        - - Xandarellida
          - - Nektaspida
            - - Conciliterga
              - - Kwanyinaspis
                - - Phytophilaspis
                  - Trilobita

==== External phylogeny ====
Cladogram supporting the Antennulata hypothesis after Liu et al; 2026:

- Panarthropoda
  - † "Lobopodia" (paraphyletic, ancestral to tardigrades, onychophorans and arthropods)
  - Total group Euarthropoda
    - †Megadictyon
    - - - †Kerygmachela
        - - †Pambdelurion
          - - †Opabiniidae
            - - † Radiodonta (e.g Anomalocaris)
              - Deuteropoda
                - †Erratus
                - - †Sunella
                  - - †Isoxyidae + "Great appendage bivalved forms"
                    - - - †Fengzhengia
                        - †Kylinxia
                      - - †Megacheira
                        - Pan-Chelicerata
                      - - †Kiisortoqia
                        - †Bushizheia
                        - Antennulata
                          - †Artiopoda
                          - Mandibulata
                            - †Fuxianhuiida
                            - - †Hymenocarina
                              - - Myriapoda
                                - Pancrustacea
