= Australimicola =

Australimicola Temporal range: Cambrian Stage 4
- Life restoration

Scientific classification
- Kingdom: Animalia
- Phylum: Arthropoda
- Clade: †Artiopoda
- (unranked): †Protosutura
- Genus: †Australimicola; Paterson, García-Bellido & Edgecombe, 2012
- Species: †A. spriggi

Binomial name
- †Australimicola spriggi Paterson et al., 2012

Genus of ancient aquatic arthropods

Australimicola is a genus of extinct marine arthropods from the Cambrian Stage 4 aged Emu Bay Shale of South Australia with a single species, A. spriggi.

== Description ==
Australimicola had an elongate (maximum width only 40-50% of the total length), oval shaped body, reaching 2–2.7 centimetres (0.79–1.06 in) in length, made up of 27 tergites (segments), which had blunt ends. The semicircular headshield, which is around 40% as long as wide, only made up about 10% of the body length, and they have no visible expression of eyes on the top (dorsal) side of the shield. The head bore a pair of segmented antennae, with these segments being about as wide as long. The head also bore a shield-shaped hypostome on the underside. A narrow gut tract ran along the length of the body, with midgut glands also being present. The endopods (leg-like walking limbs), were attached with one pair to each body segment/tergite, and tapered towards their ends. These endopod limbs were relatively short, only reaching 50% of the body width. The body ended with a small pygidium with a pair of long flat divergent spines.

== Taxonomy ==
Australimicola is placed within Artiopoda, the broader group which includes trilobites and their close relatives. In its original description it was placed in Conciliterga, but later studies placed it in Protosutura alongside Zhiwenia and Acanthomeridion from the Cambrian of China.

Cladogram following Wu et al. (2025).

- Artiopoda
  - Squamacula
  - - - - Pygmaclypeatus
        - Retifacies
      - Protosutura
        - Australimicola
        - - Zhiwenia
          - Acanthomeridion
    - - Kwanyinaspis
      - - Trilobitomorpha
          - Nektaspida
          - Conciliterga
          - Xandarellida
          - - Phytophilaspis
            - Trilobita
        - Vicissicaudata
          - Sidneyia
          - - Cheloniellida
            - - Emeraldella
              - - Kodymirus
                - - Eozetetes
                  - Aglaspidida
