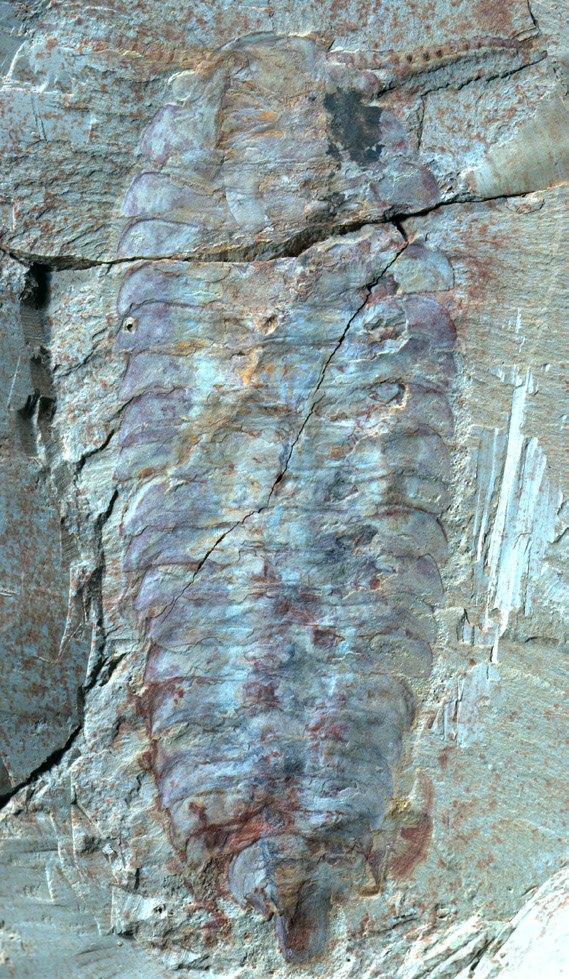
- Holotype specimen

Scientific classification
- Kingdom: Animalia
- Phylum: Arthropoda
- Clade: †Artiopoda
- (unranked): †Protosutura
- Genus: †Zhiwenia; Du, Ortega-Hernández, Yang & Zhang, 2019
- Species: †Z. coronata

Binomial name
- †Zhiwenia coronata Du, Ortega-Hernández, Yang & Zhang, 2019

= Zhiwenia =

Zhiwenia Temporal range: 489

Genus of Cambrian artiopodan

Zhiwenia is a genus of artiopodans that existed during Stage 3 of the Cambrian period and was uncovered in the Xiaoshiba Lagerstätte in China. Only one species is known, Zhiwenia coronata. An early relative of trilobites, it has been posited as the sister taxon of Australimicola in the newly defined clade Protosutura, a proposed early-branching artiopodan clade.

Likely a benthic detritus feeder, Zhiwenia measured around 5 cm (2 in) in length, and had an unmineralized exoskeleton consisting of a headshield followed by a series of body segments. Facial sutures on the headshield have been proposed to be either convergently evolved with trilobites and other artiopodans, or symplesiomorphic to artiopodans as a whole.

== Discovery and naming ==
Zhiwenia was formally described in 2018 from four specimens discovered in the Xiaoshiba Lagerstätte, in the Yunnan province of China, dating to the Cambrian Stage 3. The holotype YKLP 12370 and the paratype YKLP 12371a are both complete, respectively in dorsal and ventral view, and preserve stalked eyes and antennae. The paratype additionally preserves five pairs of trunk limbs near the posterior end of the body. Dark patches on the paratype have been interpreted as a carbonaceous film of the gut tract, while specimen YKLP 12373 possibly shows a three-dimensional gut impression.

Zhiwenia was named in honor of Professor Zhi-wen Jiang, known for his contributions to the study of microfossils and the biostratigraphy of Yunnan. The specific epithet, coronata (Latin for "crown"), refers to the notched shape of the cephalic shield.

== Description ==
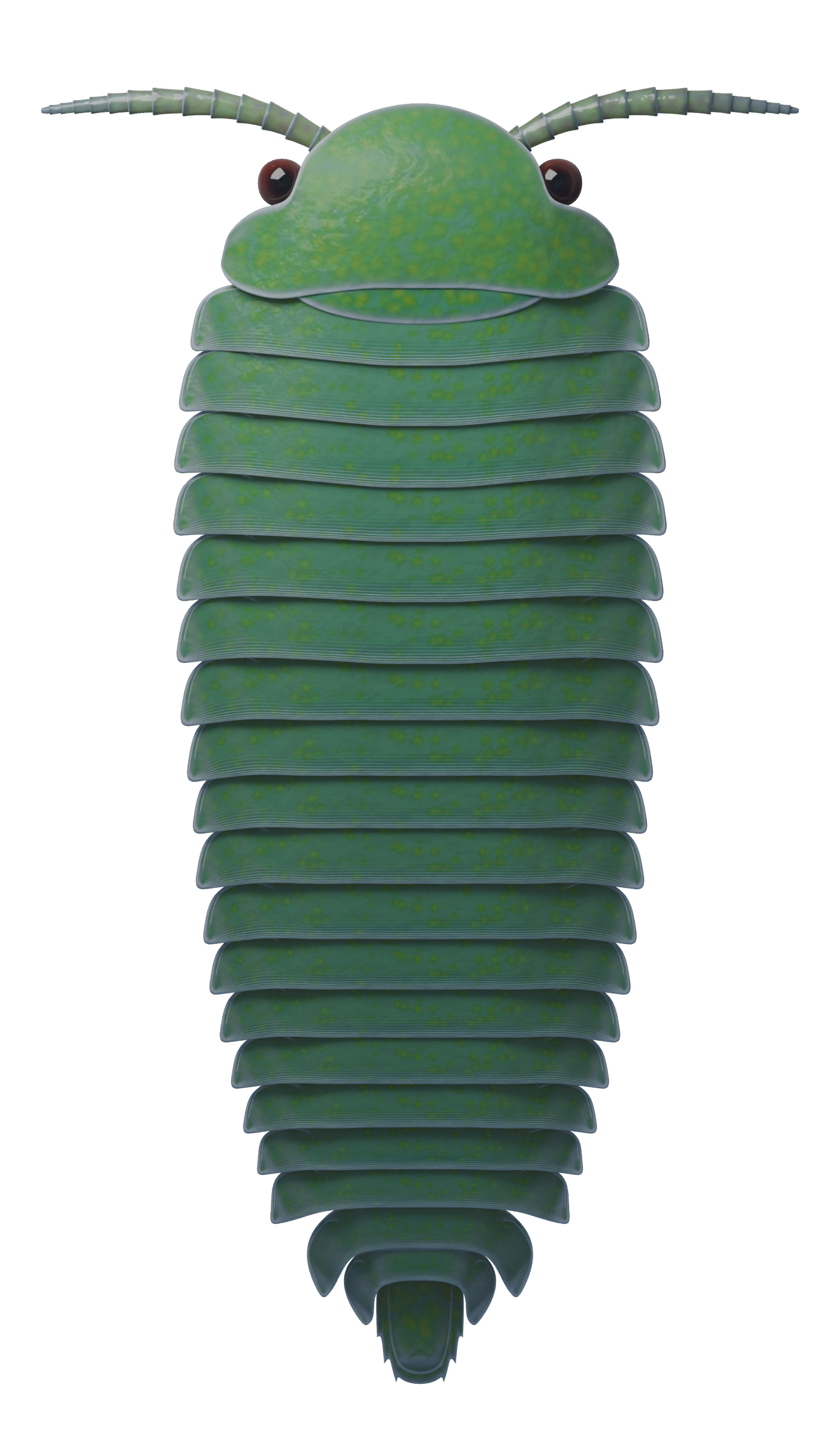
Reconstruction of Zhiwenia in dorsal view

Zhiwenia is an elongate, roughly elliptical artiopodan, lacking a biomineralized skeleton. The holotype measures 5.1 centimetres (2.0 in) along the dorsal exoskeleton, while the largest known complete specimen reaches 6.1 centimetres (2.4 in).

The head is covered in a semicircular shield, which shows a small degree of trilobation. Notches on the sides of the head, which correspond to the dorsal facial sutures, hold a pair of stalked eyes. A pair of articulated antennae, with at least 17 podomeres, is attached posteriorly to the eyes. The eyes and antennae are believed to originate, respectively, from the protocerebrum and deutocerebrum. The antennae are followed by three pairs of cephalic limbs. On the ventral face, a hypostome covers the mouth and is attached to the doublure on its anterior side. The shape of the head shield, unusual in artiopods, has been proposed to be caused by the disarticulation and subsequent loss of free cheeks in the known Zhiwenia specimens, with disarticulated free checks having been found in the morphologically similar Acanthomeridion.

The body of Zhiwenia also shows weak trilobation, and is segmented into 20 tergites. Most of them are similar in length, and slowly decrease in width towards the posterior end. The first tergite is much smaller (only 50% of the length of the second), and curved anteriorly. Tergopleurae, lateral extensions of the tergites, are present from the second segment onwards. On the last two tergites, they are strongly curved backwards, and followed by a flattened tailspine with three pairs of serrations. Biramous limbs have been observed on some body segments, with a flattened, likely bilobate exopod and a stenopodous endopod comprising at least seven segments and a terminal claw.

Zhiwenia has been hypothesized to have been a benthic detritus feeder, like most other artiopodans. This assignation was supported by a lack of differentiation in the limb segments and in the dorsal exoskeleton, as well as a lack of spinose endites. A role of facultative scavenger or predator, while possible, was not explicitly supported by the known material.

== Taxonomy ==
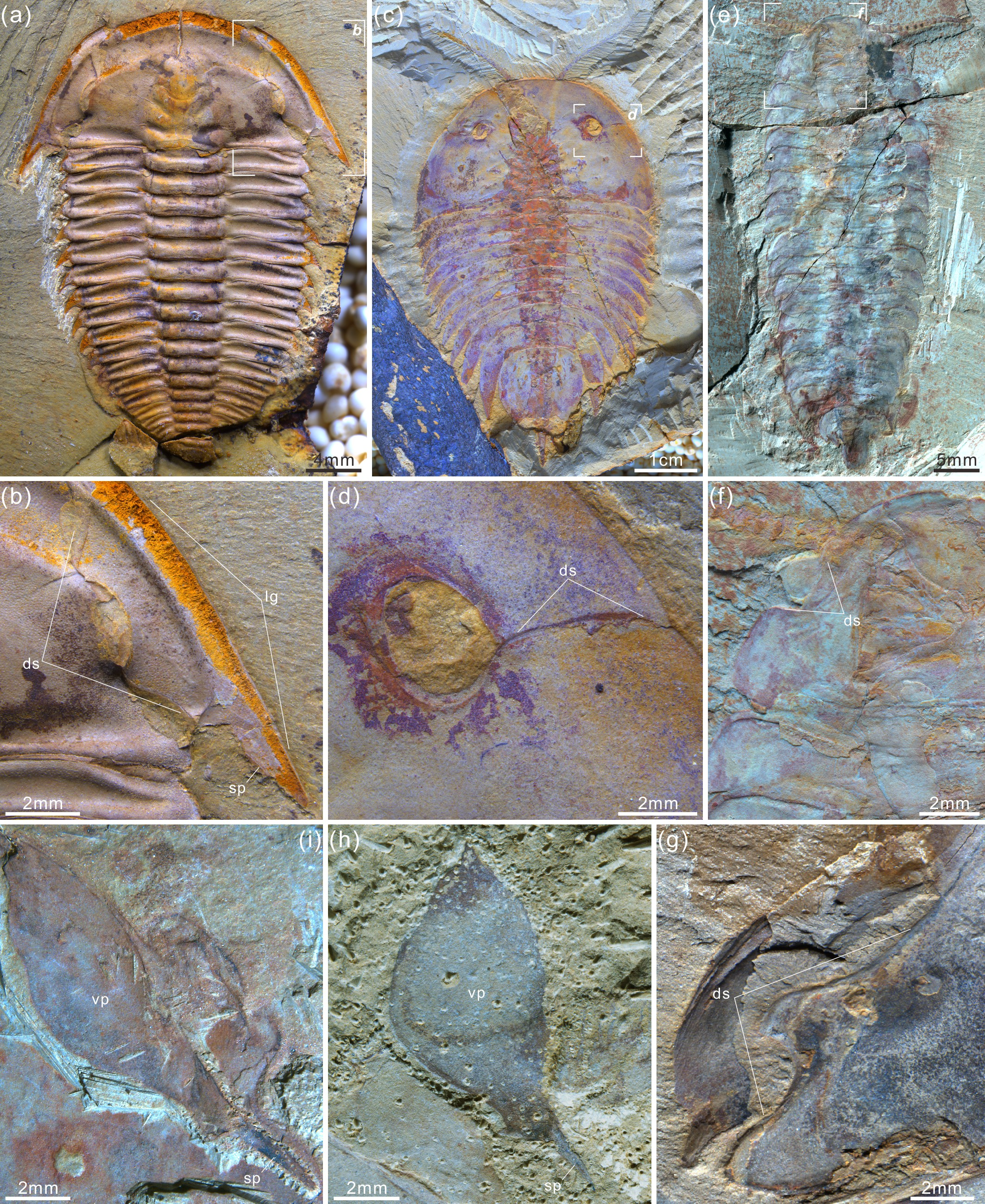
Facial sutures of Zhiwenia, (e) and (f), compared to other Cambrian artiopodans

Zhiwenia belongs to the arthropod clade Artiopoda, encompassing trilobites and their relatives. The original 2018 description established it as part of the new clade Protosutura alongside Acanthomeridion and Australimicola, with the latter being recovered as its closest relative. This group was found to be the second-earliest diverging branch of Artiopoda after Squamacula. The presence of dorsal facial sutures in a basal artiopodan lineage was interpreted as evidence of the trait possibly being symplesiomorphic to the group as a whole, although the study did not rule out the possibility of convergent evolution. A 2024 study on the anatomy of Acanthomeridion recovered Acanthomeridion as possibly closer to trilobites than Zhiwenia, and posited that cephalic sutures in Zhiwenia and xandarellids originated independently from those in trilobites. A later 2025 study focusing again on Acanthomeridion found similar results to the original 2018 study, and recovered Acanthomeridion as the sister taxon of Zhiwenia, followed by Australimicola. The three were found to be part of an early-branching artiopodan clade alongside Pygmaclypeatus and Retifacies.

Cladogram following Wu et al. (2025), which found a close relationship between Acanthomeridion and Zhiwenia.

- Artiopoda
  - Squamacula
  - - - - Pygmaclypeatus
        - Retifacies
      - Protosutura
        - Australimicola
        - - Zhiwenia
          - Acanthomeridion
    - - Kwanyinaspis
      - - Trilobitomorpha
          - Nektaspida
          - Conciliterga
          - Xandarellida
          - - Phytophilaspis
            - Trilobita
        - Vicissicaudata
          - Sidneyia
          - - Cheloniellida
            - - Emeraldella
              - - Kodymirus
                - - Eozetetes
                  - Aglaspidida

== See also ==
- List of Xiaoshiba Biota species
