= Phytophilaspis =

Phytophilaspis Temporal range: Lower Cambrian

Scientific classification
- Kingdom: Animalia
- Phylum: Arthropoda
- Clade: †Artiopoda
- Order: †Xandarellida
- Genus: †Phytophilaspis; Ivantsov, 1999

Species
- P. pergamena Ivantsov, 1999

Extinct genus of trilobites

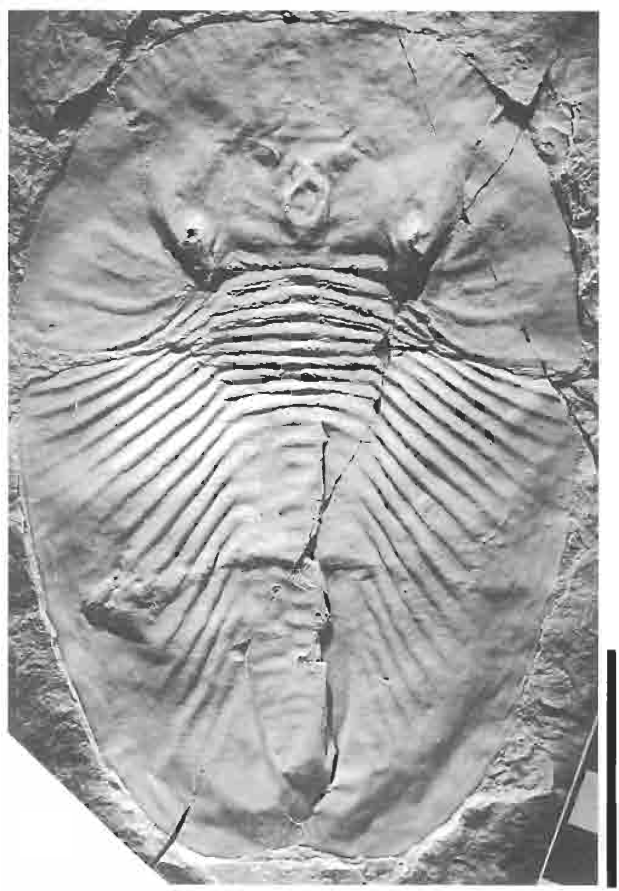
Holotype specimen, scale bar 2cm

Phytophilaspis is a phosphatized genus of trilobite-like arthropod with eyes, found in association with algal remains. It dwelt in well-lit, shallow waters.

== Description ==
Phytophilaspis has several features in common with trilobites, including: tripartite division of the dorsal shield; presence of prominent pygidium; large eyes, situated on the pleural area of the cephalon; facial sutures, and shape of the hypostome. However, it differs from trilobites in many ways, including a reduced thorax, thoracic pleura fused to each other and to the cephalon and pygidium, facial sutures not crossing the eyes, and weak original mineralization of the cuticle. Because of these differences, Phytophilaspis was originally assigned to the Artiopodan subclass Concilliterga, in an undetermined order and family. It was later considered by Bergström and Hou as a xandarellid, along with Cindarella, Xandarella and Sinoburius. A position that was supported in subsequent studies.

== See also ==
- Arachnomorpha
