= Kwanyinaspis =

Kwanyinaspis Temporal range: Cambrian Stage 3
- Drawing of the part type of the holotype Note: Eyes were located in the underside and were not visible on the dorsal surface in life

Scientific classification
- Kingdom: Animalia
- Phylum: Arthropoda
- Clade: †Artiopoda
- Subphylum: †Trilobitomorpha
- Genus: †Kwanyinaspis; Zhang & Shu, 2005
- Species: †K. maotianshanensis

Binomial name
- †Kwanyinaspis maotianshanensis Zhang & Shu, 2005

Extinct genus of arthropods

Kwanyinaspis is a genus of arthropod from the Cambrian aged Chengjiang biota of Yunnan, China. It was described in 2005 based on a single specimen, ELI-2004001. Around 6 cm long, It has twelve trunk tergites with well developed posterior facing pleural spines, along with a tail spine and ventral eyes. In the original description, it was tenatively considered a member of Aglaspidida. However, later studies have considered it a trilobitomorph, and possibly the closest known relative of trilobites.
