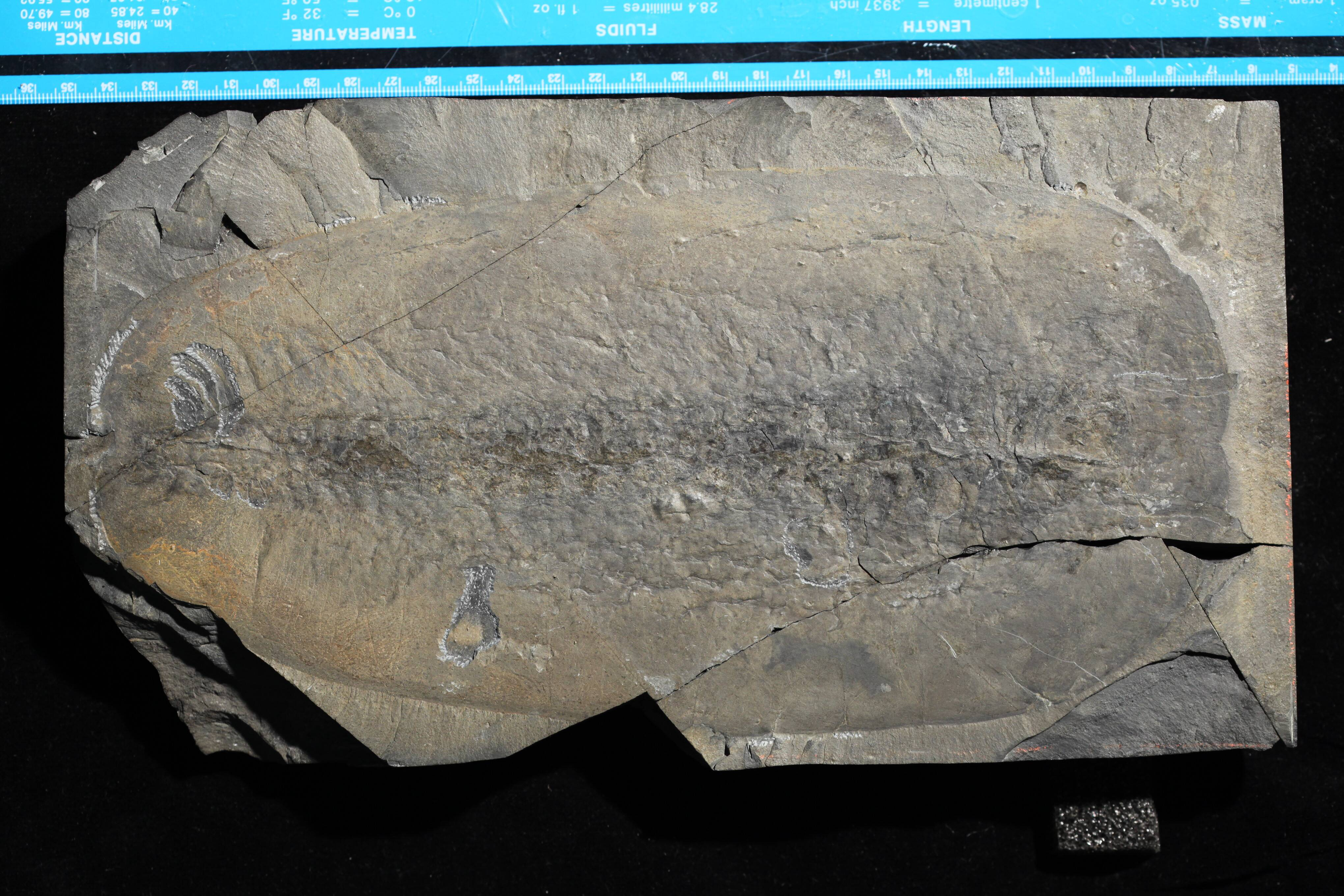
- Holotype
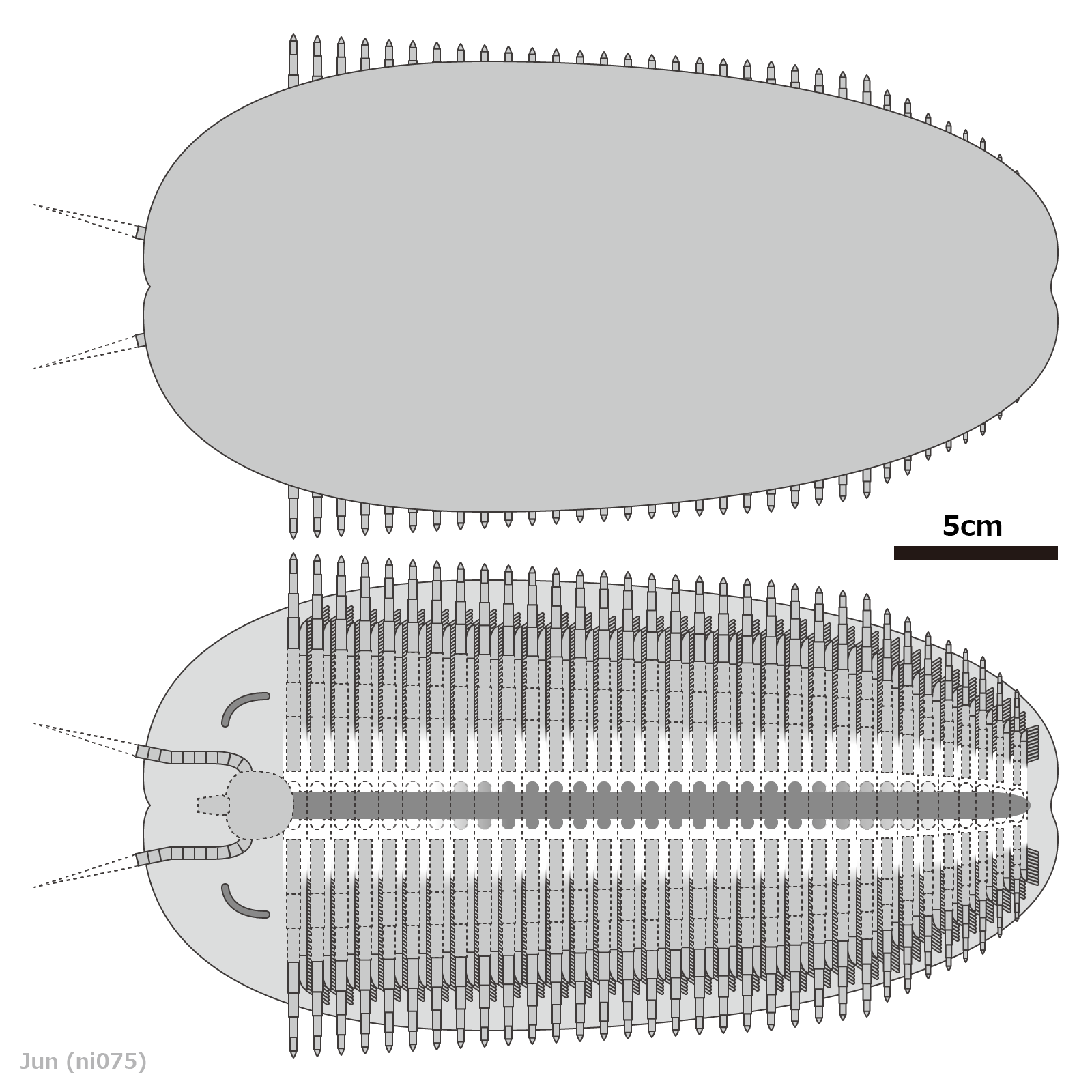
- Diagrammatic reconstruction, showing top-down view (top) and view from below (bottom)

Scientific classification
- Kingdom: Animalia
- Phylum: Arthropoda
- Clade: †Artiopoda
- Order: †Helmetiida
- Family: †Tegopeltidae
- Genus: †Tegopelte; Simonetta and Delle Cave, 1975
- Species: †T. gigas

Binomial name
- †Tegopelte gigas Simonetta and Delle Cave, 1975

= Tegopelte =

Tegopelte Temporal range: Middle Cambrian

Extinct genus of arthropods

Tegopelte gigas (from the Greek tegos, "tile", and pelte, "leather-shield", referring to the shape of the dorsal body covering; gigas – from the Greek gigas, "giant", due to the huge size of the animal) is a species of large soft-bodied arthropod known from two specimens found in the Middle Cambrian Burgess Shale of British Columbia, Canada.

== Description ==
Tegopelte was a large arthropod, reaching a body length of 28 centimetres (11 in) and width of 14 centimetres (5.5 in). The body was covered in a large undivided dorsal shield that was unmineralised. On the head a pair of tear-shaped eyes were present on the underside of the shield, along with a pair of antennae. The body had 33 pairs of biramous (two branched) limbs, with the endopod (lower leg-like branch) functioning as the walking limbs, though the ones at the far back of the body are likely too small to have been useful for walking. The endopods had at least four segments/podomeres. The exopods (upper branch) of the limbs pairs bore elongated filament-like structures, and probably functioned as gills. Within the body were gut diverticulae used to digest food.

== Ecology ==
Trackway production of Tegopelte gigas

Tegopelte is suggested to have been a seafloor dwelling (benthic) animal that was either a predator or a scavenger. Trackways probably produced by Tegopelte are known from the Kicking Horse Shale, stratigraphically below its body fossil occurrences. These suggest that it had the ability to skim along the seafloor at a brisk pace and could perform tight turns, though the tracks suggest that they also at times more slowly walked across the seafloor.

== Taxonomy ==
Although historically classified as a true trilobite, is no longer thought to be part of this group. It is currently considered a member of the clade Conciliterga within Trilobitomorpha, a group which contains trilobites and their close relatives.

After Jiao et al. 2021.

- Artiopoda
  - Squamacula clypeata
  - - Protosutura
      - - Zhiwenia coronata
        - Australimicola spriggi
      - - Acanthomeridion serratum
        - Acanthomeridion anacanthus
    - - Bailongia longicaudata
      - Trilobitomorpha
        - Retifacies abnormalis
        - - - - Kwanyinaspis maotiashanensis
              - Trilobita
                - Olenoides serratus
                - Eoredlichia intermedia
            - Conciliterga
              - Haifengella corona
              - - - Kuamaia lata
                  - Helmetia expansa
                - - Tegopelte gigas
                  - Skioldia aldna
                  - Saperion glumaceum
          - - Xandarellida
              - Cindarella eucalla
              - - Luohuilinella deletres
                - Luohuilinella rarus
                - - Sinoburius lunaris
                  - - Xandarella spectaculum
                    - Phytophilaspis pergamena
            - Nektaspida
              - Buenaspis forteyi
              - - Tariccoia arrusensis
                - Soomaspis splendida
                - Liwia convexa
              - - Naraoia spinosa
                - - Naraoia compacta
                  - Misszhouia longicaudata
      - Vicissicaudata
        - Sidneyia inexpectans
        - - Emeraldella brocki
          - Cheloniellida
            - Cheloniellon calmani
            - - Triopus draboviensis
              - Duslia insignis
          - - Kodymirus vagans
            - - Eozetetes gemmelli
              - Aglaspidida
                - Beckwithia typa
                - - - Chlupacaris dubia
                    - - Quasimodaspis brentsae
                      - - Tremaglaspis unite
                        - - Tremaglaspis vanroyi
                          - Brachyaglaspis singularis
                    - - Cyclopites vulgaris
                      - Australaglaspis stonyensis
                      - - Uarthrus instabilis
                        - Flobertia kochi
                        - - Aglaspella granulifera
                          - - Gogglops ensifer
                            - - Glypharthrus simplex
                              - Aglaspis spinifer
                          - - Chraspedops modesta
                            - - Glypharthrus thomasi
                              - - Glypharthrus trispinicaudatus
                                - Glypharthrus magnoculus

== See also ==
- Paleobiota of the Burgess Shale
