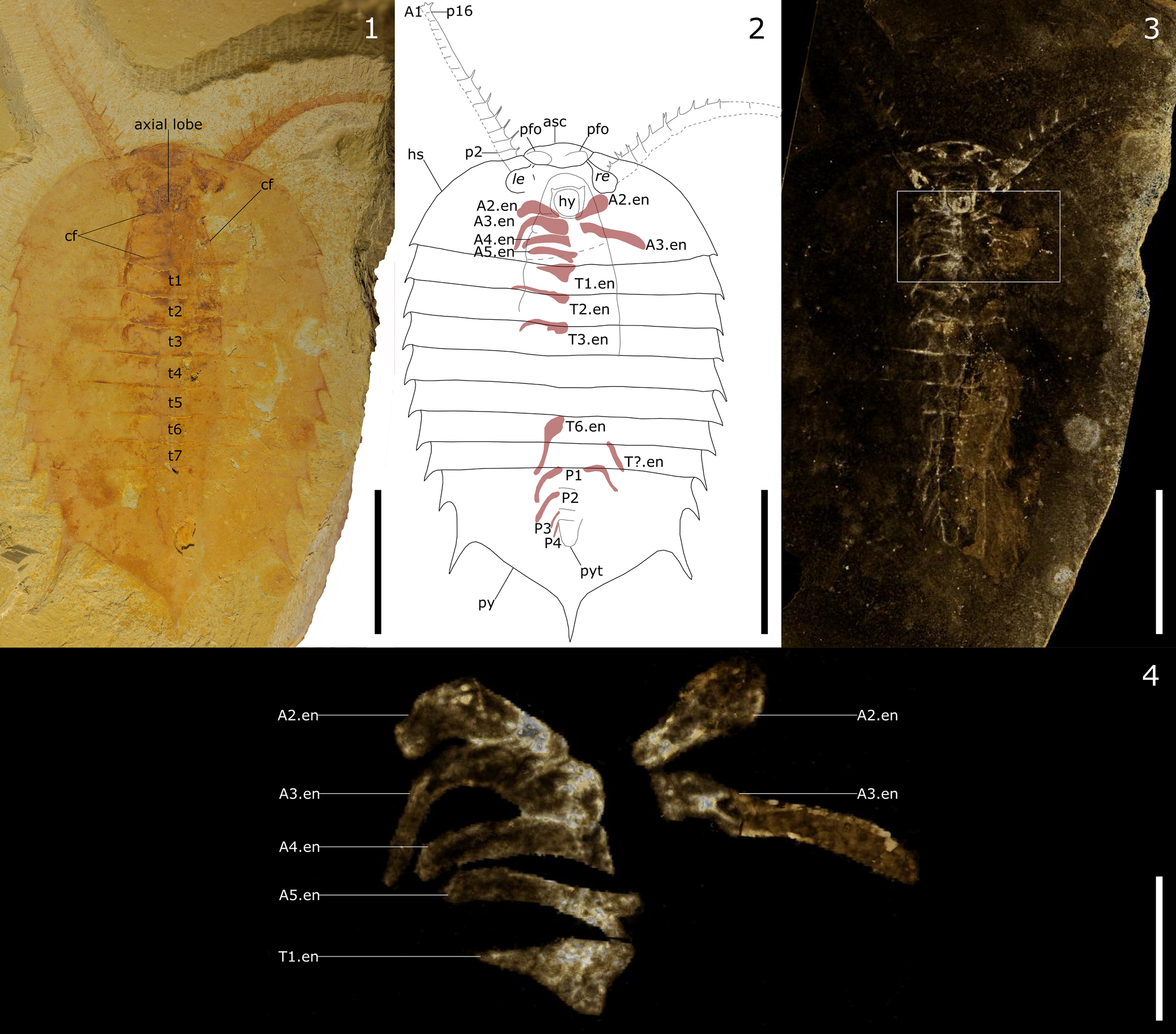
- Fossil of Kuamaia lata including under normal light and tomographic view, with accompanying drawing

Scientific classification
- Kingdom: Animalia
- Phylum: Arthropoda
- Clade: †Artiopoda
- Subphylum: †Trilobitomorpha
- Subclass: †Conciliterga
- Family: †Helmetiidae
- Genus: †Kuamaia; Hou 1987

Species
- Kuamaia lata Hou 1987; Kuamaia muricata Hou and Bergström 1997

= Kuamaia =

Kuamaia Temporal range: Cambrian Stage 3

Extinct genus of arthropods

Kuamaia is an extinct genus of marine Cambrian arthropod belonging to Conciliterga, which is part of the broader group Artiopoda (which contains trilobites and their close relatives). Fossils of the type species K. lata were discovered in the Chengjiang biota. The other species in the genus, K. muricata has also been identified there, but neither species has been found elsewhere.

== Morphology ==
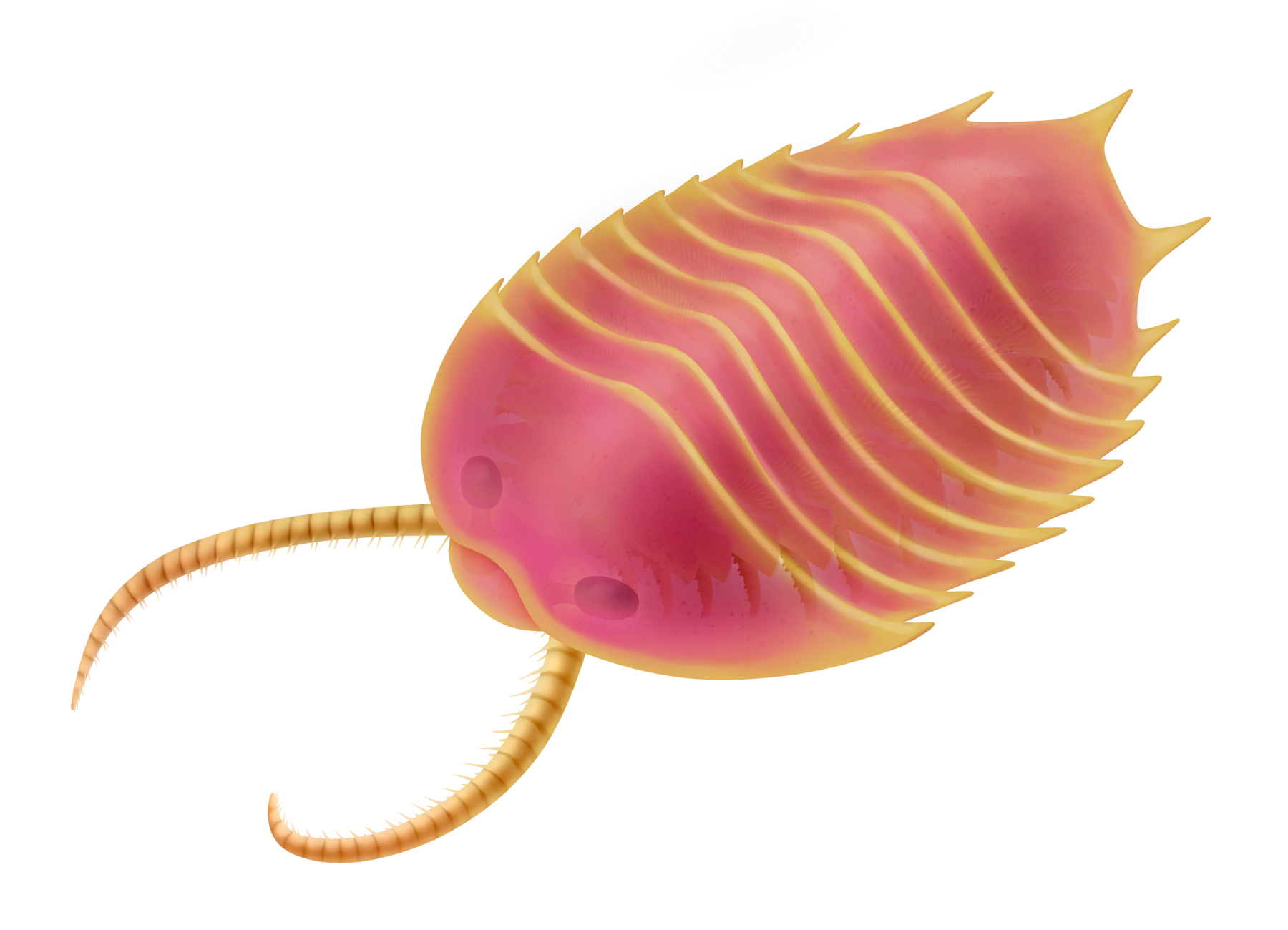
Reconstruction of Kuamaia lata

Kuamaia has an oval dorsal exoskeleton (tergite) shape, with a gradual decline from the somewhat elevated medial axis of the animal to the exoskeleton edge. The surface appears smooth, with little space between tergites and low-profile pleural (lateral) spines. The cephalon (head shield) is trapezoid and wider than long. The thorax has 7 or 8 segments. The pygidium (tail) has 2 or 3 pairs of lateral spines and 1 terminal spine. The body length (excluding appendages) ranges between 1.4 cm and 7.9 cm for K. lata and 1.48 cm for K. muricata.

The head bore a pair of lateral (presumably compound) eyes, with the optic lobes of these extending into the anterior sclerite as a pair of median eye-like frontal organs. The lateral eyes were originally thought to be dorsal, but later study suggest it was ventral instead, connected to the anterior sclerite via a pair of short eyestalks.

On the underside of Kuamaia's head, there is a ventral sclerite (hypostome) connected to the posterior edge of anterior sclerite, located between a pair of antennae. In the case of K. lata, the antennae have paired inner spines, suggesting they were raptorial appendages. The remaining appendages are numerous pairs of biramous (branched) legs, each compose of a large protopod (base), 5-6 segmented endopod (inner branch) and a flatten exopod (outer branch). The exopods acted as the gills of K. lata. These gills were made up of many lamellae, which facilitated gas exchange. These lamellae were packed together in rows on each exopod. K. lata had a lower number of these, with an average number of 22 lamellae per exopod, compared to an average of 50 in other arthropods.

Previously the head of this genus were thought to have only 3 pairs of legs, but later studies on K. lata revealed 4 pairs instead, suggesting the head was formed by 6 body segments (ocular somite and 5 anterior somites corresponded to the antennae and 4 leg pairs). Each thoracic segment has 1 pair of legs. The pygidium has 4 pairs of legs in K. lata. The cephalic and pygidial legs of K. muricata are unknown, but the pygidium of this species showing traces of 8 body segments, outnumbered those of K. lata.

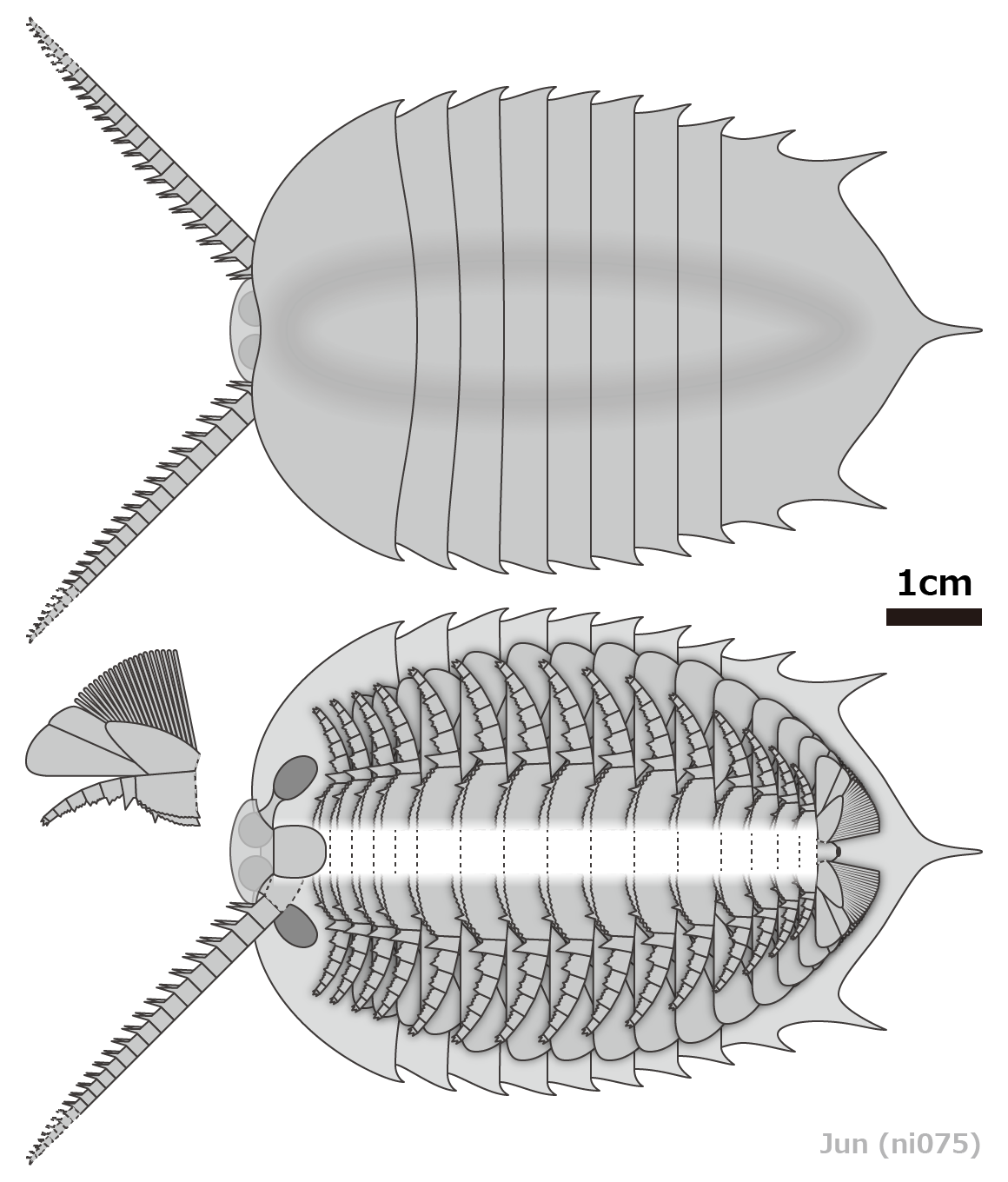
Diagrammatic reconstruction of Kuamaia lata

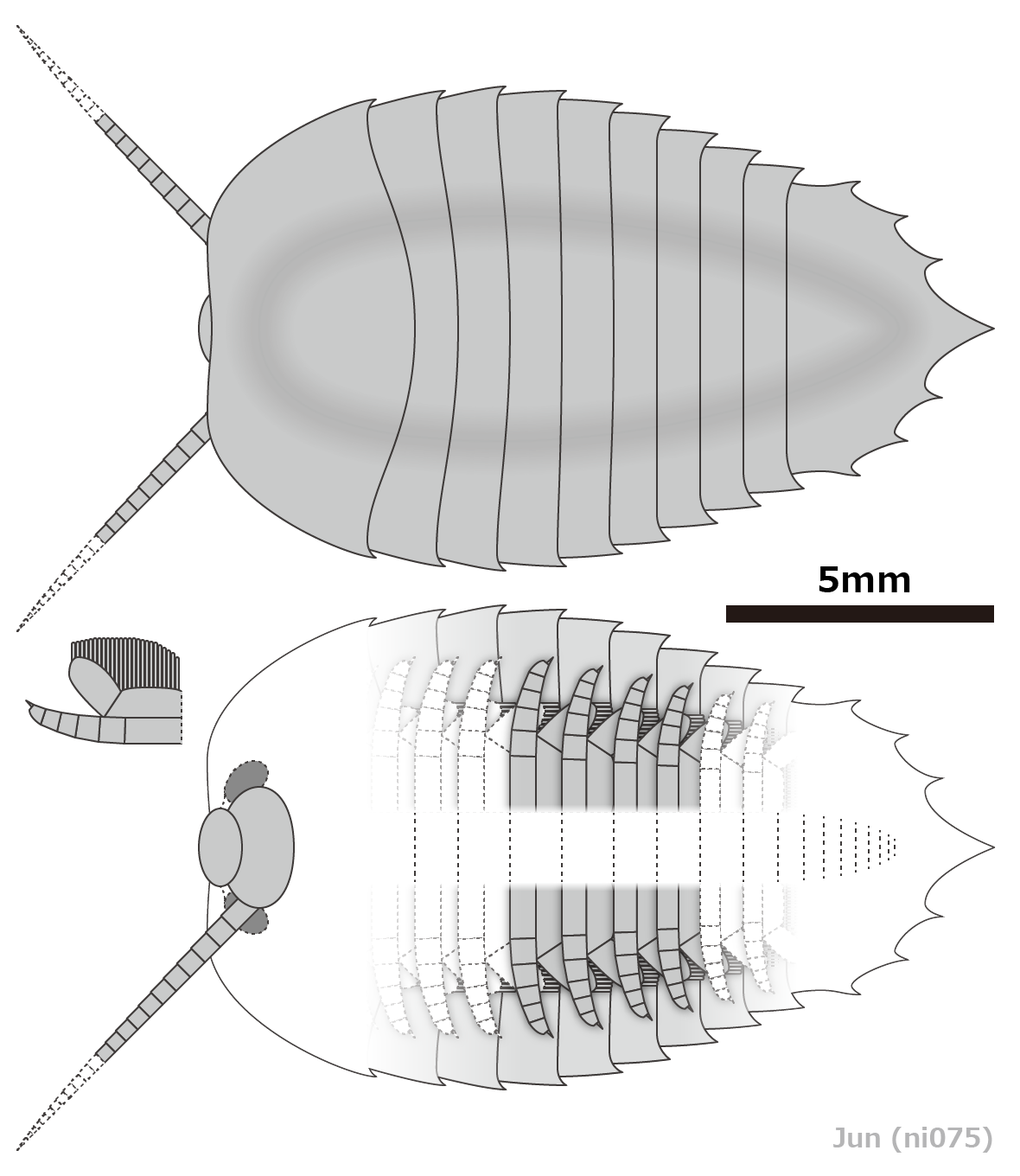
Diagrammatic reconstruction of Kuamaia muricata

== Paleoecology ==
Kuamaia lata may had been a benthic arthropod and a mobile predator and scavenger. The raptorial condition of K. lata's antennae are similar to those of Kiisortoqia, suggesting the capability of grasping food items. A spiny section on K. lata's legs is presumed to have allowed it to tear apart food.

== Taxonomy ==
Kuamaia is a member of Conciliterga, a subgroup of trilobitomorph artiopods. Within this taxon, It is also classified as helmetiids (Order Helmetiida, Family Helmetiidae) alongside similar forms such as Helmetia, Haifengella and Rhombicalvaria. Kuamaia is distinguishable from other helmetiids by its trapezoid head, 7-8 segmented thorax and relatively reduced lateral spines. K. muricata is distinguishable from the type species K. lata by its more thoracic segments, smaller pygidium with more lateral spines, as well as exopod distal segment fringed by bristles.

The derived position of K. lata within Artiopoda suggest its raptorial antennae were modified from their sensory function in other artiopods, convergent to the ancestrally raptorial frontalmost appendages of other arthropods (e.g. Kylinxia, Isoxys).

Cladogram after Losso et al. 2025:

- Artiopoda
  - Squamacula
  - - - Acanthomeridion
      - - Zhiwenia
        - Australimicola
    - - Kwanyinaspis
      - - Vicissicaudata
        - Trilobitomorpha
          - - - Xandarellida
              - Nektaspida
            - - - Retifacies
                - Pygmaclypeatus
              - - Campanamuta
                - Trilobita
          - Conciliterga
            - Arthroaspis
            - - Tegopeltidae
                - Skioldia
                - - Tegopelte
                  - Saperion
              - Helmetiidae
                - Kuamaia lata
                - - Kuamaia muricata
                  - - Helmetia
                    - - Rhombicalvaria
                      - Haifengella
