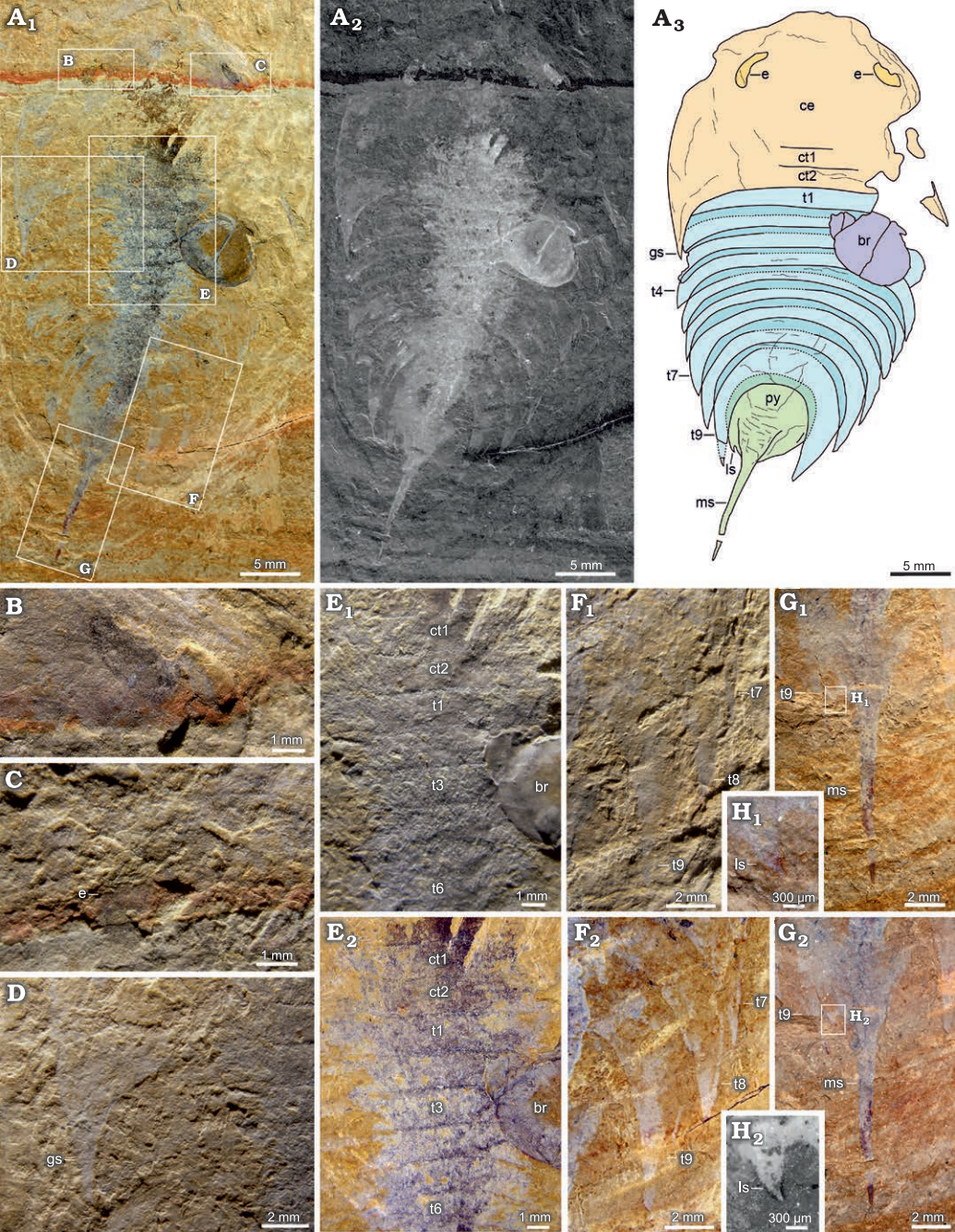
- Fossil of Zhugeia acuticaudata

Scientific classification
- Kingdom: Animalia
- Phylum: Arthropoda
- Clade: †Artiopoda
- Order: †Xandarellida
- Genus: †Zhugeia; Zhu et al., 2023
- Species: †Z. acuticaudata

Binomial name
- †Zhugeia acuticaudata Zhu et al., 2023

= Zhugeia =

Zhugeia Temporal range: Cambrian Stage 3

Genus of extinct arthropod

Zhugeia is an extinct genus of xandarellid arthropod from the middle Cambrian Stage 3. It was found in the Kuangshan section of the Yu''anshan Formation, near the Qujing city of Yunnan Province, China. The genus contains a single species, Zhugeia acuticaudata.

== Discovery and naming ==
The only known specimen of Zhugeia was found in the Yu'anshan Formation (Kuangshan section of the upper Maotianshan Member). The genus name is after the Zhuge Mountain, and the specific name is after the Latin acuti, meaning spinous, and caudata, meaning tail.

== Description ==
The body is 49 mm (1.9 in) long. The cephalon is semi-elliptical with a pair of genal spines. The eyes are ovoid. The body is made of nine segments that slightly overlap each other. The pygidium is situated within a notch made by the pleural spines of the last tergite. It is 16 mm (0.63 in) long with the pygidial spine.

== Affinities ==
Zhu et al. (2023) placed Zhugeia within the clade Xandarellida. This was later supported by Zhang et al. (2024). The strict consensus tree derived from the phylogenetic analyses of this study is shown in the cladogram below:

- Xandarellida
  - - Luohuilinella deletres
    - Luohuilinella rarus
  - - Cindarella eucalla
    - - Xandarella spectaculum
      - - Zhugeia acuticaudata
        - Sinoburius lunaris
