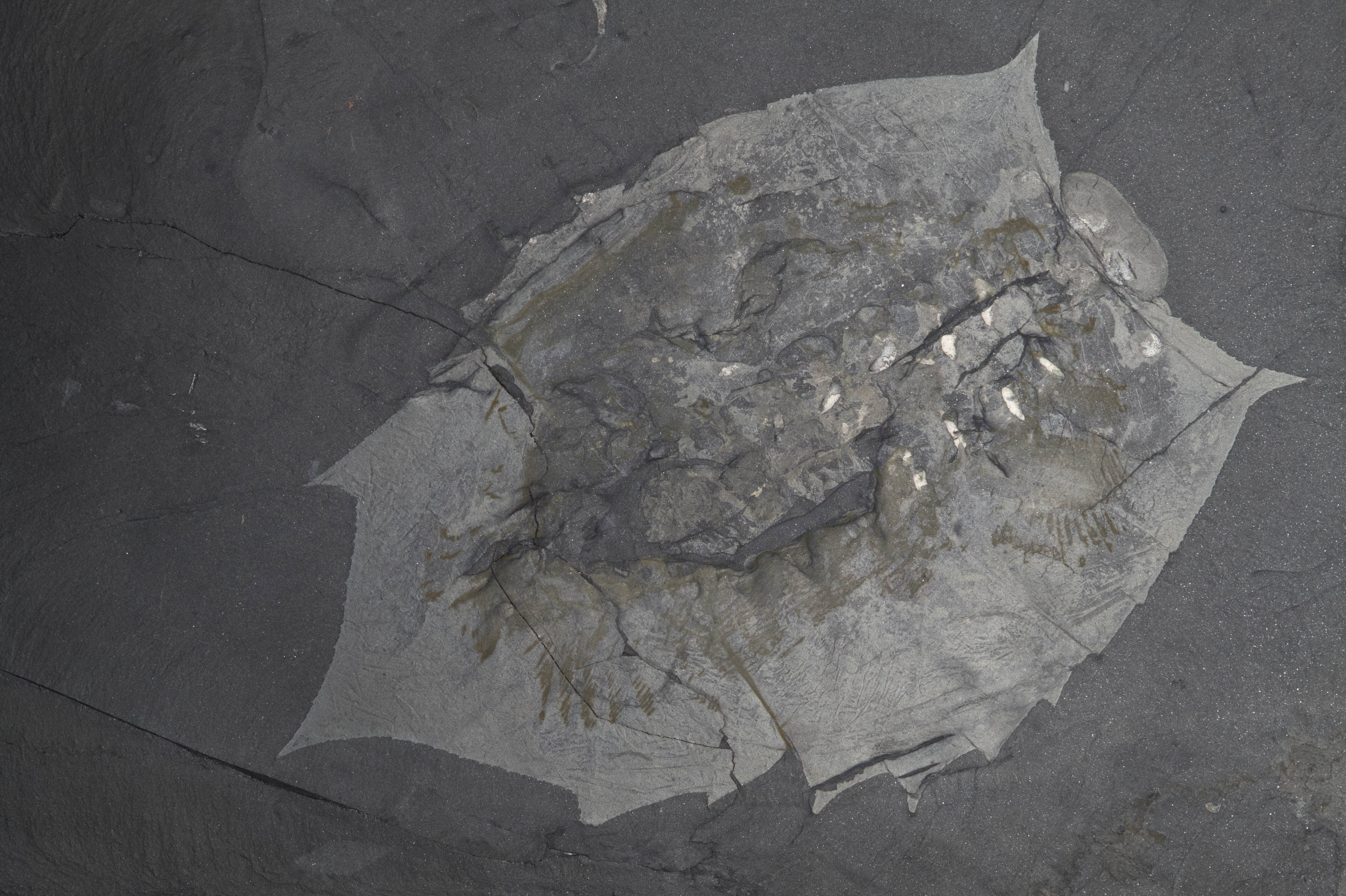
- Holotype specimen of Helmetia expansa
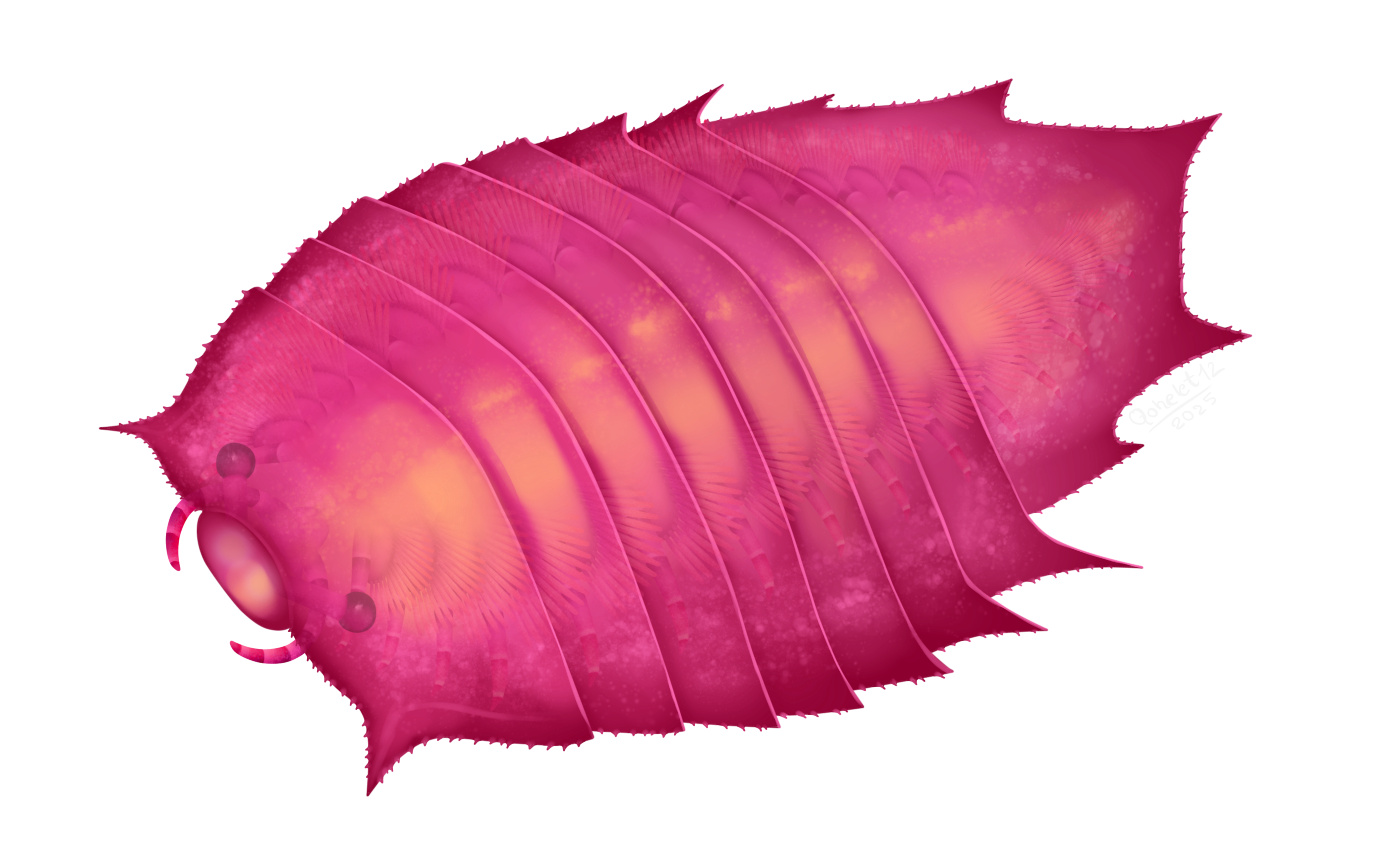
- Reconstruction

Scientific classification
- Kingdom: Animalia
- Phylum: Arthropoda
- Clade: †Artiopoda
- Subphylum: †Trilobitomorpha
- Subclass: †Conciliterga
- Family: †Helmetiidae
- Genus: †Helmetia; Walcott, 1918
- Species: †H. expansa

Binomial name
- †Helmetia expansa Walcott, 1918

= Helmetia =

Helmetia Temporal range: Wuliuan

Genus of arthropods (fossil)

Helmetia is an extinct genus of arthropods from the middle Cambrian (Wuliuan). Fossils of the type species Helmetia expansa have been found in the Burgess Shale of Canada. It is characterized by a pair of spines in front of its head. It is classified under Conciliterga, a group of trilobitomorph artiopod.

== Discovery ==
Fossils of Helmetia are both rare and poorly known; the monotypic genus was described by Charles Doolittle Walcott in 1918 and has not been reexamined. Despite additional specimens had been discovered between 1975 and 1998, only the holotype was briefly mentioned in other subjects and the genus has been included in a number of cladistic analyses since 1990s. It was redescribed in 2025, revealing some details on its previously poorly known anatomy.

As of 2025, there are 35 specimens of Helmetia expansa from Burgess Shale and 1 undefined specimen from the nearby Tulip Beds. A few specimens showing part of the animal's moulting process. A putative second species Helmetia? fastigata, which was based on a pygidium-like sclerite found in the Jince Formation of the Czech Republic, may had been a misidentified remain of hurdiid radiodont.

== Morphology ==
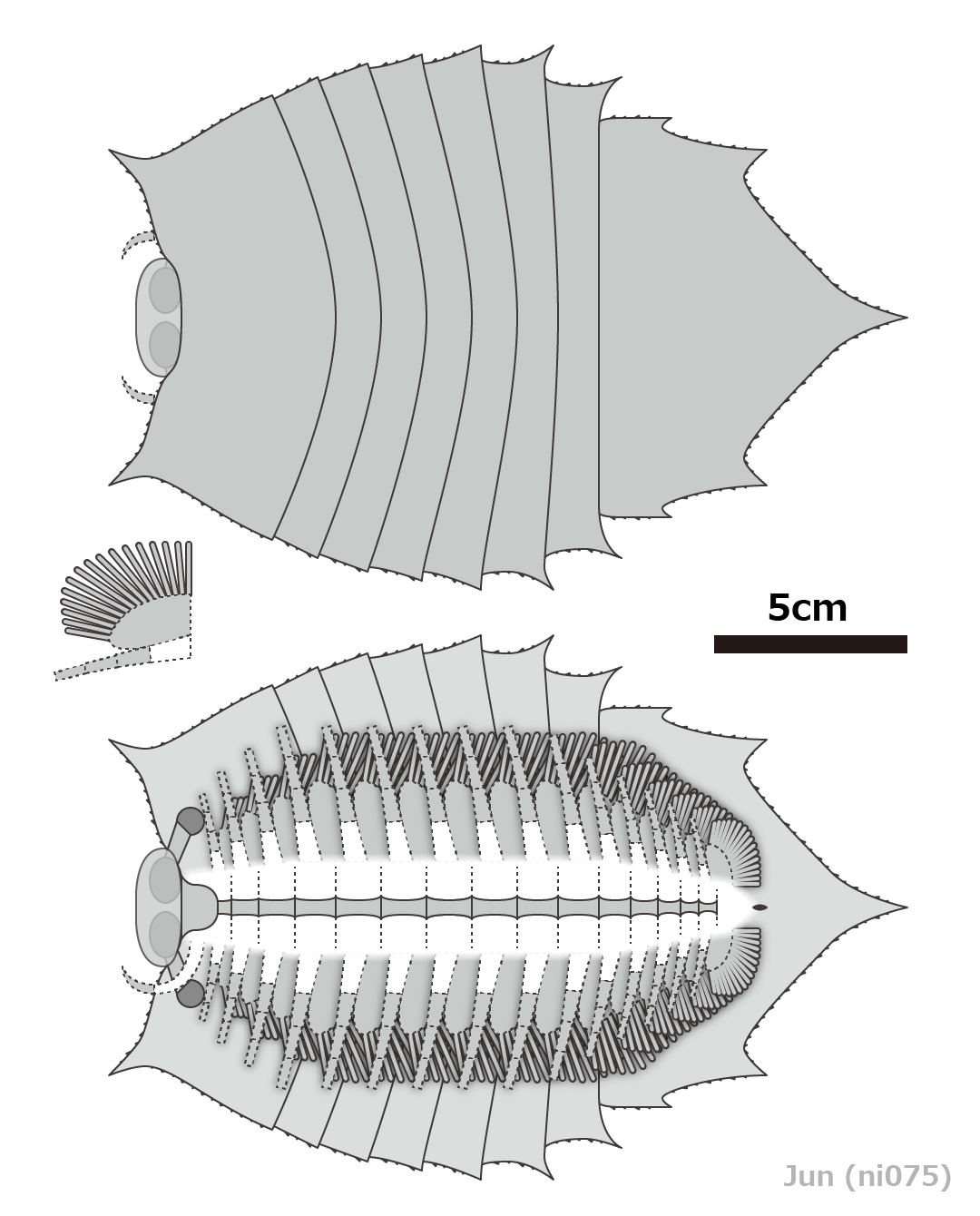
Anatomical diagram

Helmetia is a large arthropod with body length ranges between 9.2 and 18.3 cm. The whole animal is broad and flat with a thin exoskeleton. The leaf-shaped dorsal exoskeleton (tergite) have serrated margins and was divided into a trapezoid cephalon (head shield), a thorax with 6 segments, and a triangular pygidium (tail shield) with 5 marginal spines (2 pairs and 1 terminal). Unlike many artiopods, the margin of the head shield is concave, ending in a spine on each frontal corner. There is an oval anterior sclerite with two median eye-like frontal organs at the anterior center of the head shield, behind which are two stalked lateral eyes hidden underneath the head shield and a hypostome in between them. Other ventral structures are not well described, and due to that it is originally considered as only had filamentous limbs (exopods). However, remains suggest that it had endopods (walking legs) like other artiopods, and possibly have around 15 pairs of them: 3 or 4 for head (the fourth pair are located at the cephalon-thorax boundary), 1 for each thoracic segment and at least 5 for pygidium, with a series of hourglass-shaped sternites align at the midline. The first pair of appendages are a pair of short antennae. The gut possess 5 pairs of midgut glands at the anterior section.

== Paleoecology ==
In the old reconstruction, Helmetia was thought to be a suspension feeder which swim slowly by using its legless exopods. However, based on the discovery of endopods and digestive glands, Helmetia is most likely a benthic scavenger or predator capable of walking around the seafloor and processing complex food items, similar to the ecological interpretation of many other trilobitomorphs. Further details of its diet are unknown as the protopods (variably spiny, food-chewing limb base in many benthic arthropods) are yet to be discovered.

== Taxonomy ==
Alongside other helmetiids (e.g. Kuamaia), it is a member of Conciliterga, a group which had been resolved by multiple phylogenetic analysis as one of the closest relatives of trilobites within Artiopoda.

Cladogram of Artiopoda with a focus on Conciliterga after Losso et al. 2025:

- Artiopoda
  - Squamacula
  - - - Acanthomeridion
      - - Zhiwenia
        - Australimicola
    - - Kwanyinaspis
      - - Vicissicaudata
        - Trilobitomorpha
          - - - Xandarellida
              - Nektaspida
            - - - Retifacies
                - Pygmaclypeatus
              - - Campanamuta
                - Trilobita
          - Conciliterga
            - Arthroaspis
            - - Tegopeltidae
                - Skioldia
                - - Tegopelte
                  - Saperion
              - Helmetiidae
                - Kuamaia lata
                - - Kuamaia muricata
                  - - Helmetia
                    - - Rhombicalvaria
                      - Haifengella
