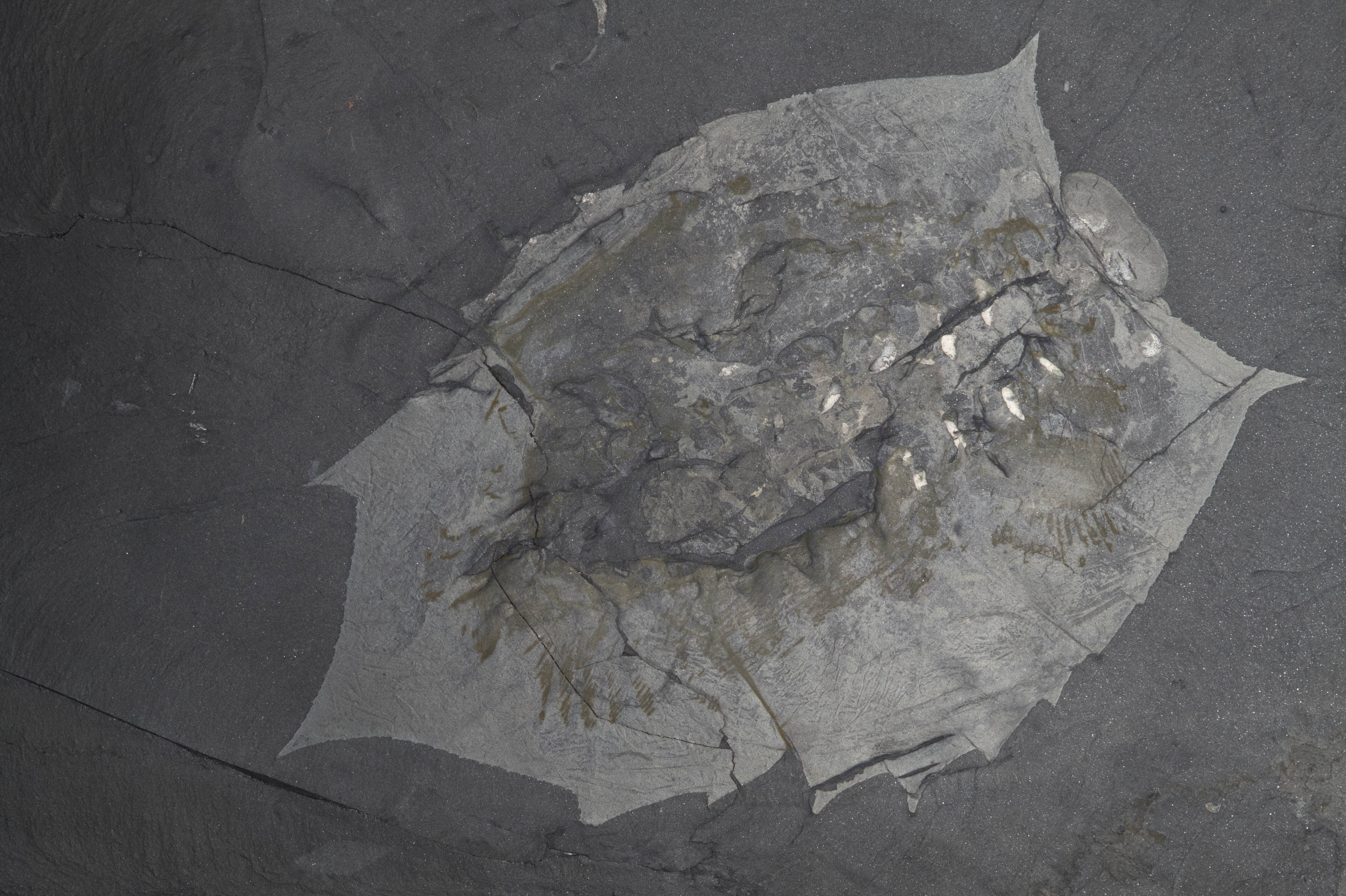
- Holotype of Helmetia expansa
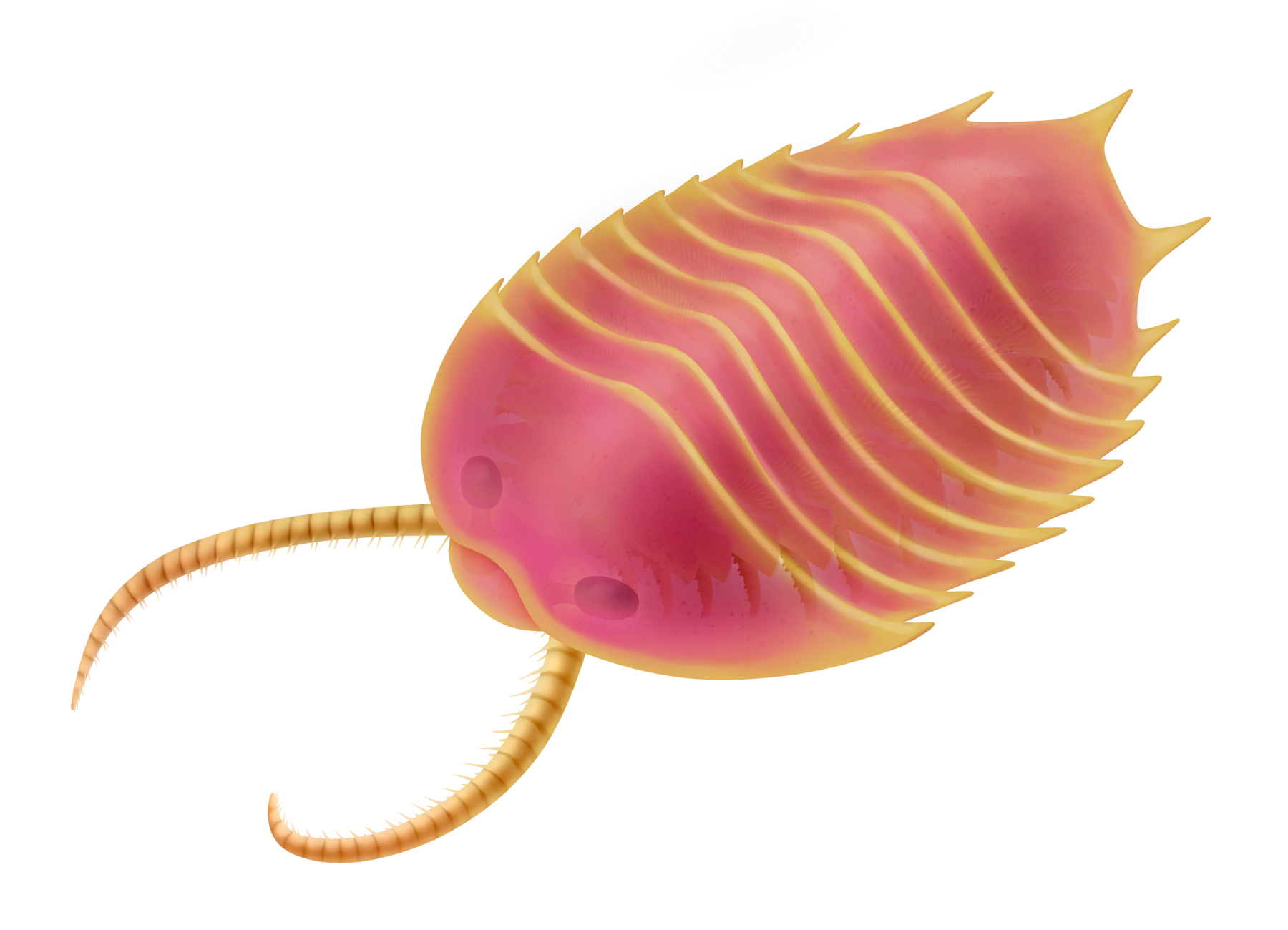
- Life restoration of Kuamaia lata

Scientific classification
- Kingdom: Animalia
- Phylum: Arthropoda
- Clade: †Artiopoda
- Subphylum: †Trilobitomorpha
- Subclass: †Conciliterga; Hou & Bergström, 1997

Type species
- †Helmetia expansa Walcott, 1918

Genera
- †Arthroaspis; †Kwanyinaspis?; †Tegopeltidae; †Tegopelte; †Saperion; †Skioldia; †Helmetiidae; †Helmetia; †Rhombicalvaria; †Haifengella; †Kuamaia

= Conciliterga =

Conciliterga Temporal range: Cambrian Stage 3–Wuliuan

Extinct order of artiopods

Conciliterga is an extinct order of artiopod arthropods, exclusively known from the Middle Cambrian. They are placed within the clade Trilobitomorpha, which contains the trilobites and their closest relatives.

Conciliterga is united by their partially or wholly fused tergites, which gives rise to their name (Conciliterga is composed of the Latin words concilio ("to unite") and tergum ("back")). Most members of this clade are elliptical in body shape, with 6-9 thoracic tergites, a head shield and a large tail shield in the members with incomplete tergite fusion. These members, which formerly comprised the order Helmetiida (which currently only contains Helmetia, Rhombicalvaria and Kuamaia), also have various other characteristics like a lack of axial region, rostral and pararostral plates on the head, and compound eyes near the rostral plate. In addition, they have essentially uniform biramous limbs running down the body with coarse endopods, alongside a pair of antennae. A second clade is also observed, containing Tegopelte, Saperion and Skioldia. This clade is characterised by wholly fused tergites (although Skioldia still shows traces of their outlines, and so is likely more basal), alongside more ventral eyes. Haifengella, while appearing very helmetiid-like, has been recovered as the basalmost concilitergan, suggesting the Tegopelte-like clade is especially derived. Kwanyinaspis's inclusion within Conciliterga is unclear, as while many studies place it near Aglaspidida, a 2010 study found it as a stem-concilitergan instead. However a 2022 study instead recovered it as the closest relative to trilobites. Members of Conciliterga are known from only a few locations around the world, mainly the Maotianshan Shales and Burgess Shale. Another paper published by Losso et al. 2025, which re-analyzed Helmetia, erected two new families within the conciliterga, the Helmetiidae and the Tegopeltidae. Losso et al. 2025 also resolved the taxonomic relationships of Arthroaspis, an artiopod from the Sirius Passet locality in northern Greenland, placing it as an early diverging taxon within the conciliterga.

Cladogram after Losso et al. 2025:

- Artiopoda
  - Squamacula
  - - - Acanthomeridion
      - - Zhiwenia
        - Australimicola
    - - Kwanyinaspis
      - - Vicissicaudata
        - Trilobitomorpha
          - - - Xandarellida
              - Nektaspida
            - - - Retifacies
                - Pygmaclypeatus
              - - Campanamuta
                - Trilobita
          - Conciliterga
            - Arthroaspis
            - - Tegopeltidae
                - Skioldia
                - - Tegopelte
                  - Saperion
              - Helmetiidae
                - Kuamaia lata
                - - Kuamaia muricata
                  - - Helmetia
                    - - Rhombicalvaria
                      - Haifengella
