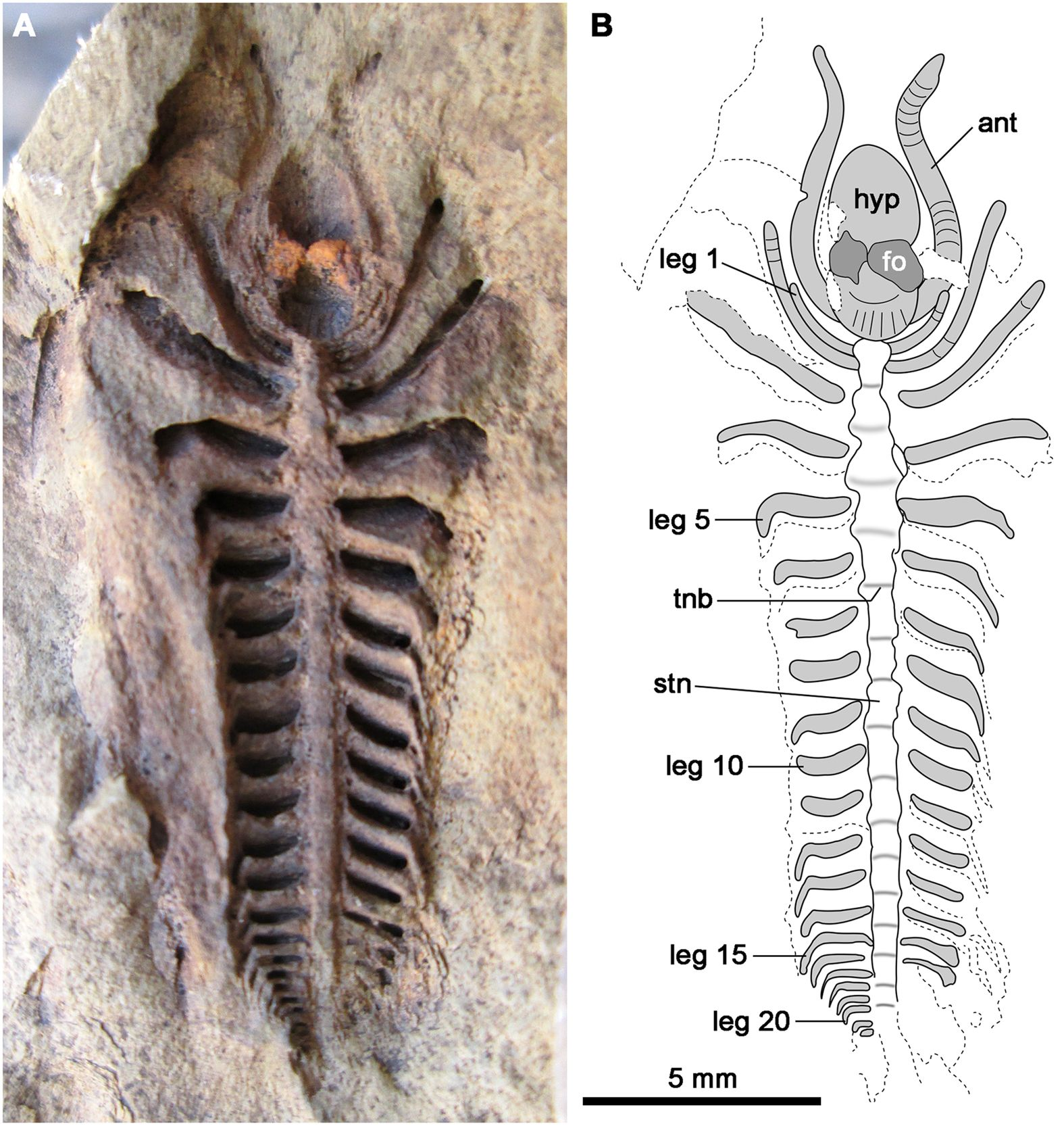
- Gigoutella mauretanica fossil showing ventral structures (previously identified as Xandarella mauretanica)

Scientific classification
- Kingdom: Animalia
- Phylum: Arthropoda
- Clade: †Artiopoda
- Class: †Trilobita
- Order: †Ptychopariida
- Family: †Palaeolenidae
- Genus: †Gigoutella; Hupe, 1953

Species
- †Gigoutella atlasensis Hupé, 1953; †Gigoutella mauretanica (Ortega-Hernández et al., 2017)

= Gigoutella =

Gigoutella Temporal range: Botomian，524–518.5 Ma

Extinct genus of trilobites

Gigoutella is an extinct genus from a well-known class of fossil marine arthropods, the trilobites. It lived during the Botomian stage, which lasted from approximately 524 to 518.5 million years ago. This faunal stage was part of the Cambrian Period.

Study published in 2024 have shown that fossils from Tatelt Formation, Morocco, which was previously identified as Xandarella mauretanica, have exceptionally preserved ventral structures.
