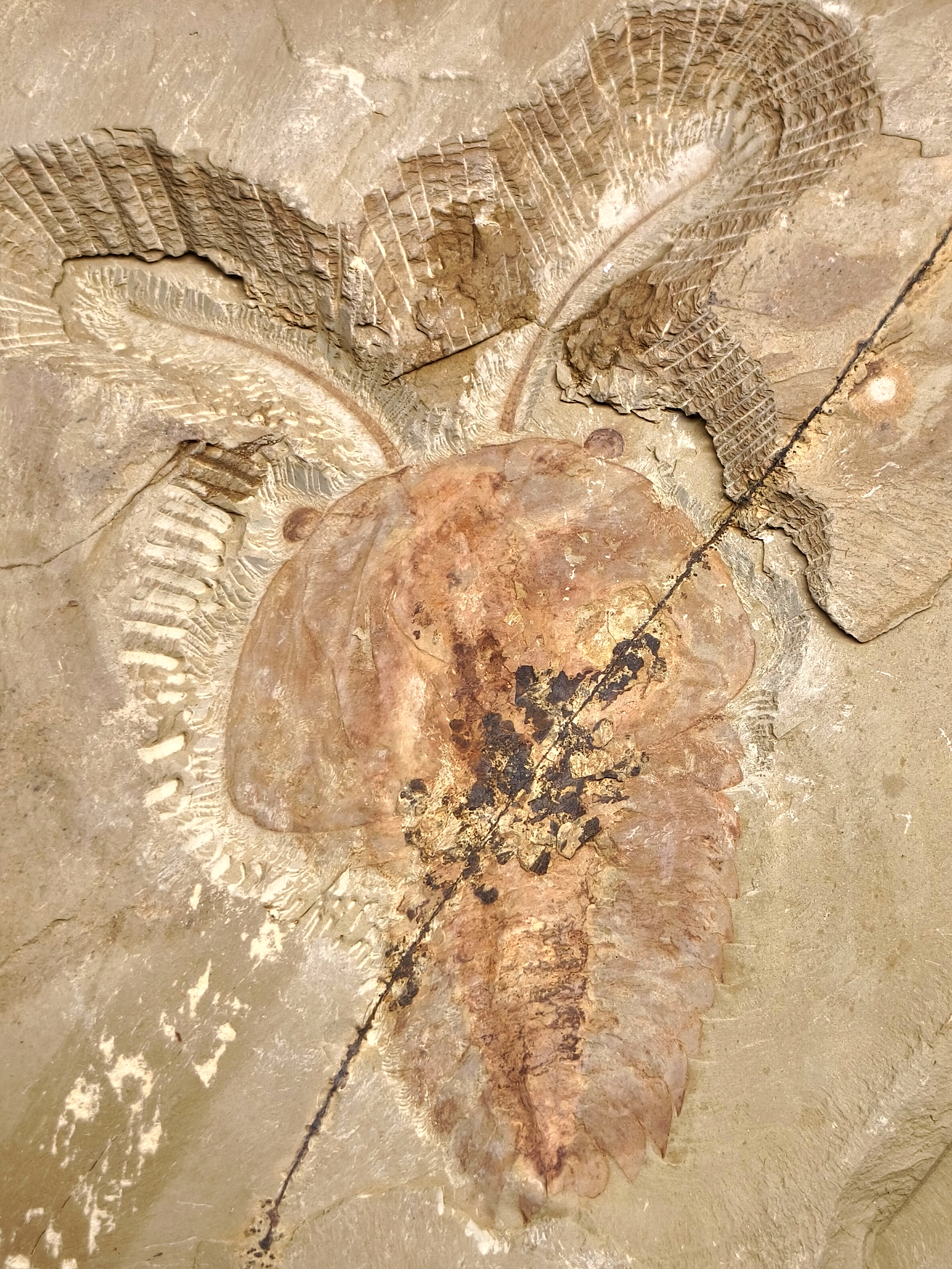
- Fossil of Cindarella eucalla

Scientific classification
- Kingdom: Animalia
- Phylum: Arthropoda
- Clade: †Artiopoda
- Order: †Xandarellida
- Genus: †Cindarella; Chen et al. 1996
- Species: †C. eucalla

Binomial name
- †Cindarella eucalla Chen et al. 1996

Synonyms
- Almenia spinosa Hou et Bergström 1997

= Cindarella =

Cindarella Temporal range: Early Cambrian–Mid Cambrian

Extinct species of an artiopod

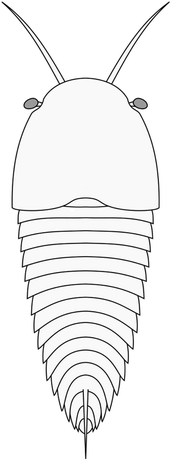
Drawing of Cindarella eucalla

Cindarella is genus of trilobite-like Cambrian arthropod known from the Chengjiang biota of China. It is classified in the stem group of trilobites (Artiopoda) in the clade Xandarellida, along with Phytophilaspis, Sinoburius, and Xandarella.

== See also ==
- Arthropod
- Cambrian explosion
- Chengjiang biota
  - List of Chengjiang Biota species by phylum
