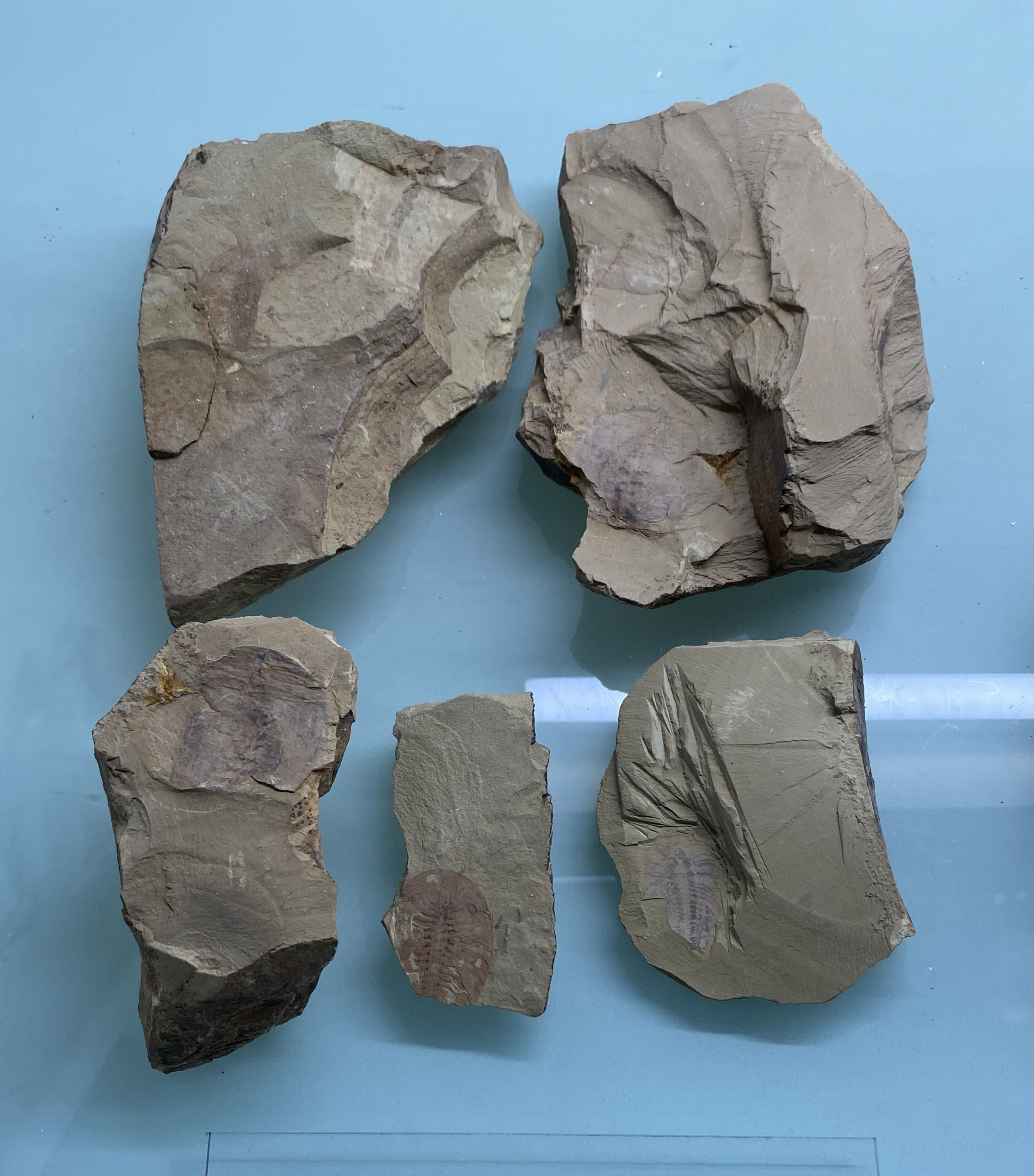
- Fossil of Saperion glumaceum in Yuxi Museum

Scientific classification
- Kingdom: Animalia
- Phylum: Arthropoda
- Clade: †Artiopoda
- Subclass: †Conciliterga
- Order: †Helmetiida
- Family: †Tegopeltidae
- Genus: †Saperion; Hou, Ramsköld & Bergström, 1991

Type species
- Saperion glumaceum Hou, Ramsköld & Bergström, 1991

= Saperion =

Saperion Temporal range: Cambrian Stage 3

Extinct genus of arthropod

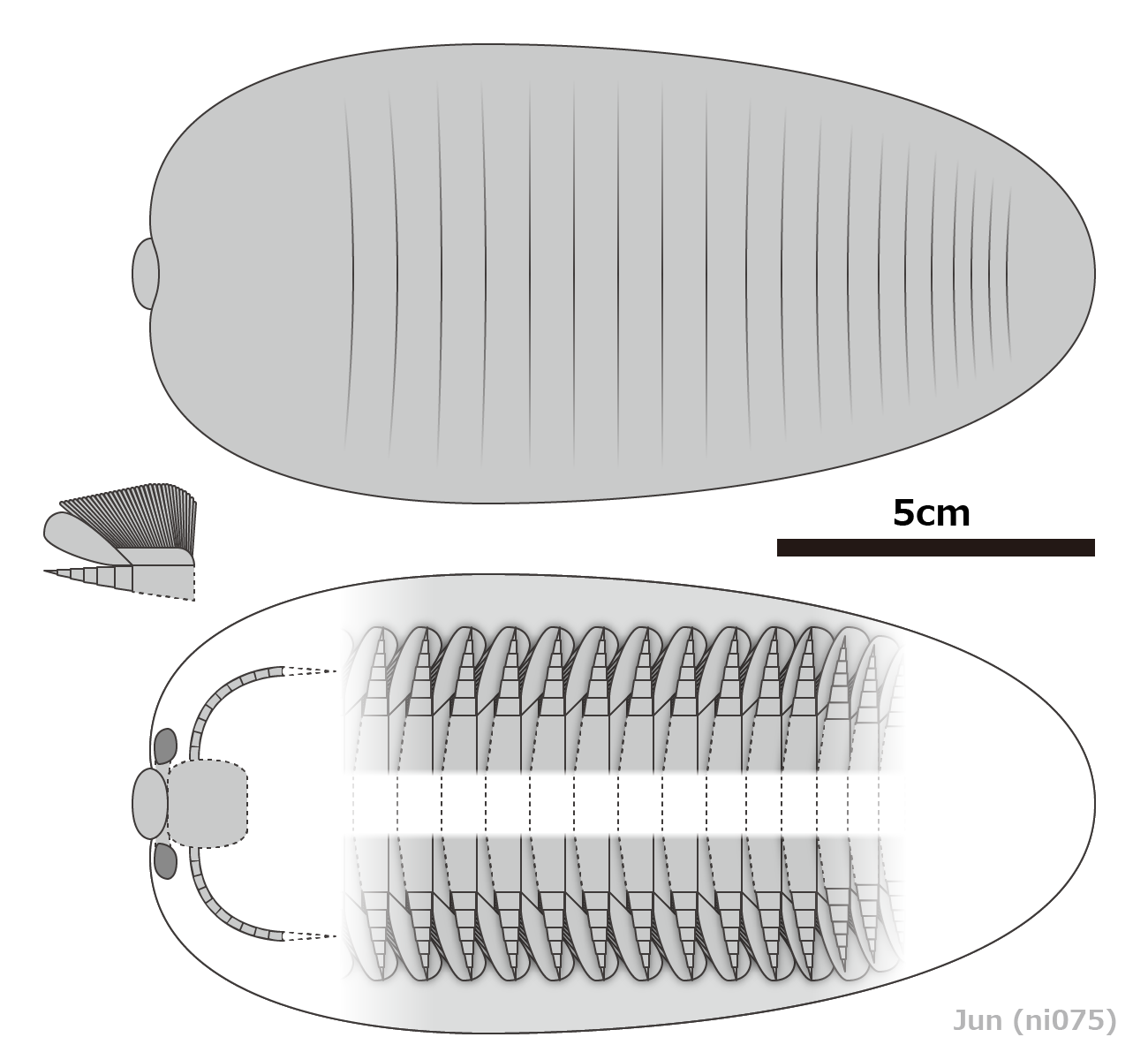
diagrammatic reconstruction

Saperion is an extinct genus of trilobite-like arthropod. It lived during the late Atdabanian stage, which lasted from 521 to 514 million years ago during the early part of the Cambrian Period. It was found in the Maotianshan Shales of Yunnan, China. Similar to the closely related Skioldia and Tegopelte, the head shield and trunk tergites were fused into a single plate. There are about 19 furrows indicating the original trunk segments. a small anterior sclerite articulated to the front of its head. A pair of antennae and lateral eyes located ventrally behind the anterior sclerite, lateral to the hypostome. Saperion reached 151 mm in length and had nearly 25 pairs of biramous limbs for walking.
