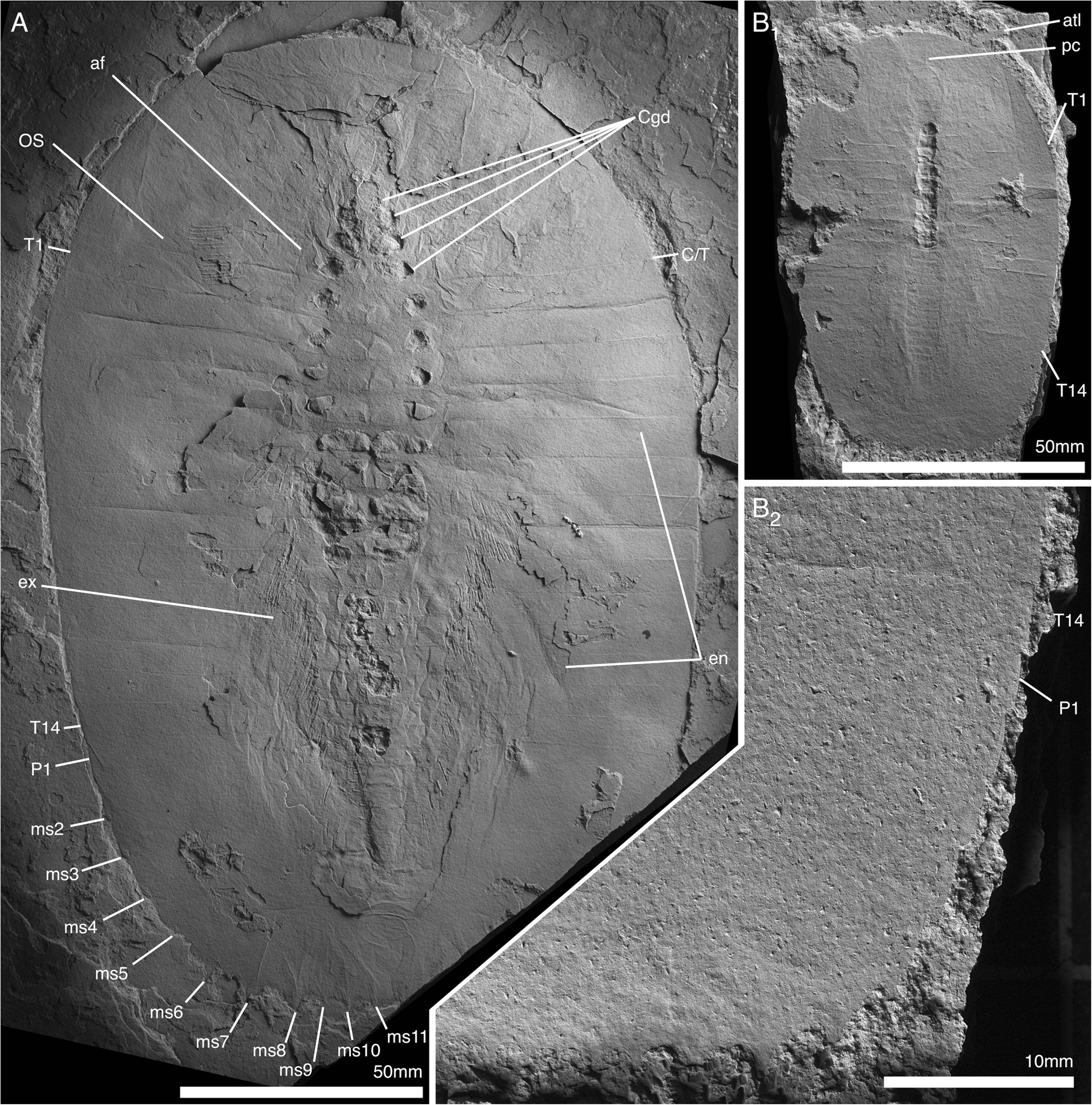

Scientific classification
- Kingdom: Animalia
- Phylum: Arthropoda
- Clade: †Artiopoda
- Subphylum: †Trilobitomorpha
- Subclass: †Conciliterga
- Genus: †Arthroaspis; Stein, M., Budd, G.E., Peel, J.S. et al 2013
- Species: †A. bergstroemi

Binomial name
- †Arthroaspis bergstroemi Stein, M., Budd, G.E., Peel, J.S. et al 2013

= Arthroaspis =

Arthroaspis Temporal range: Cambrian Series 2

Extinct genus of arthropods

Arthroaspis is an extinct genus of arthropod known from the Cambrian aged Sirius Passet Lagerstatte in Greenland. It is relatively large in size for Cambrian arthropods, attaining a length of up to 215 mm. It is a common component of the Passet fauna, being located at multiple localities within the formation. It possessed 14 tergites. In the describing paper, it was recovered as a member of a non-monophyletic Artiopoda. It has subsequently been considered a potential close relative of nektaspids. Another paper from 2025 which re-analyzed the Burgess Shale artiopod Helmetia expansa, found Arthroaspis to be a basal member of the Conciliterga, within the Trilobitomorpha.
