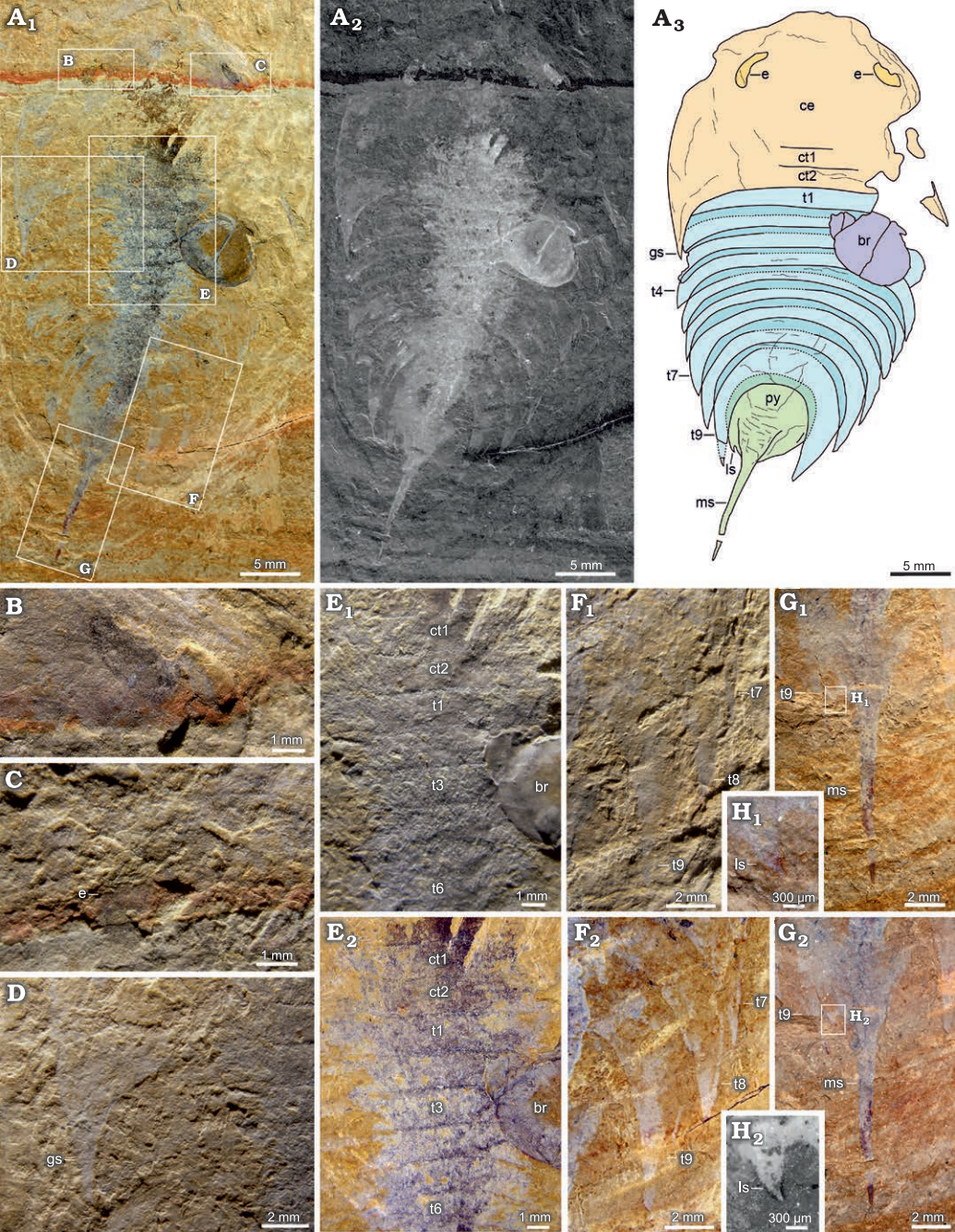
- Fossils of Zhugeia

Scientific classification
- Kingdom: Animalia
- Phylum: Arthropoda
- Clade: †Artiopoda
- Subphylum: †Trilobitomorpha
- Order: †Xandarellida; Chen, Ramsköld, Edgecombe & Zhou in Chen et al, 1996

Type species
- †Xandarella spectaculum Hou, Ramsköld & Bergström, 1991

Genera
- †Xandarella; †Luohuilinella; †Cindarella; †Sinoburius; †Phytophilaspis; †Zhugeia; †Austroxandarella

Synonyms
- Petalopleura Hou and Bergström, 1997

= Xandarellida =

Xandarellida Temporal range: Cambrian Stage 3–Cambrian Stage 4

Extinct order of artiopods

Xandarellida is an extinct order of artiopod arthropods known from the Middle Cambrian of China, Australia and Siberia.

== Morphology ==
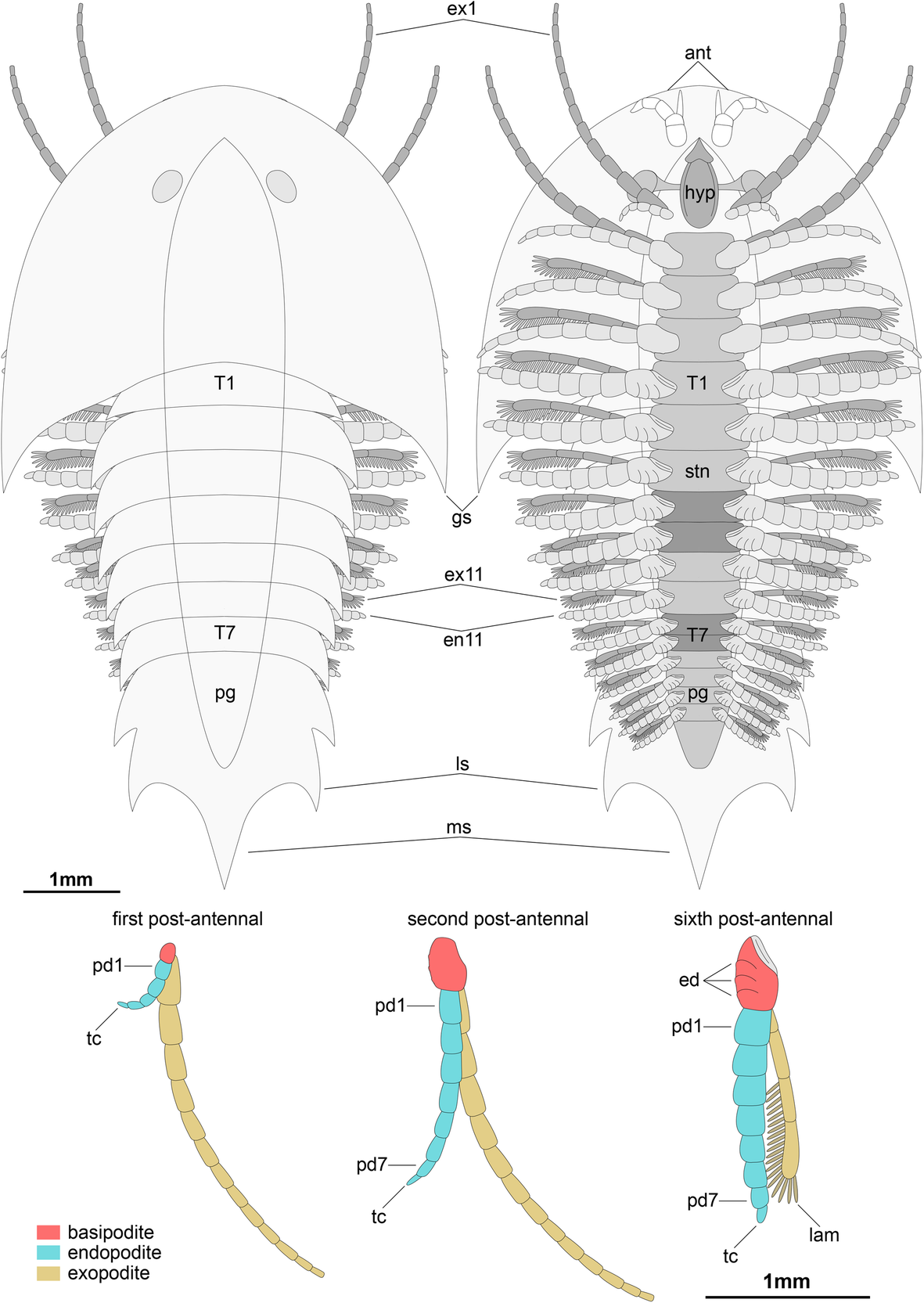
Diagrammatic reconstruction of Sinoburius

In terms of anatomy, xandarellids share numerous characteristics such as a natant hypostome, alongside a unique feature known as "segment decoupling" where the amount of limbs exceeds the amount of tergites. They also share a posteriorly extended semicircular head shield and ventral stalked eyes. The genus Cindarella in particular has complex eyes, with over 2000 ommatidia in each. Cindarella also has a large anterior spine on the fifteenth tergite. Xandarella has an unusual tripartite head shield, with ventral eye slits likely retained from the ancestral stalked eyes, alongside possibly lacking the anterior spine. Phytophilaspis has an especially intricate head shield, sharing its tripartite nature with Xandarella alongside bearing several sutures all over its body and seemingly having almost completely fused tergites. Luohuilinella has a large amount of tergites (with the type species having 27) but otherwise resembles other xandarellids save for an unfused three-segmented pygidium. Sinoburius resembles Xandarella in having an elongate posterior spine and Phytophilaspis in having all but a few tergites fused, although it exhibits secondary loss of eye slits. Unusually, Sinoburius also has two small lateral spines near its posterior. Zhugeia is relatively usual for the clade, however its median spine is very long and needle-like, in addition to having a relatively large pygidium. Austroxandarella has an elongated pygidium, but otherwise resembles Xandarella closely.

== Taxonomy and distribution ==
Xandarellida was originally defined by Chen, Ramsköld, Edgecombe & Zhou in 1996, including only the genera Xandarella and Cindarella. Hou and Bergström in 1997 grouped Xandarellida and Sinoburius together in a subclass called Petalopleura, but this grouping was later considered to be more poorly defined than Xandarellida, which is now used in preference to it. Xandarellida is classified as a member of Artiopoda, the clade containing the trilobites and their close relatives, typically as members of Trilobitomorpha, which contains the closest relatives of trilobites within Artiopoda. Xandarellida contains numerous species, most from the Maotianshan Shales of China. The two exceptions to this are Phytophilaspis from the Sinsk Formation of Russian Siberia and Austroxandarella from the Emu Bay Shale.

Phylogeny after Losso et al. 2025:

- Artiopoda
  - Squamacula
  - - - Acanthomeridion
      - - Zhiwenia
        - Australimicola
    - - Kwanyinaspis
      - - Vicissicaudata
        - Trilobitomorpha
          - - - Nektaspida
              - Xandarellida
                - Cindarella
                - - Luohuilinella
                  - - Sinoburius
                    - - Xandarella
                      - Phytophilaspis
            - - - Retifacies
                - Pygmaclypeatus
              - - Campanamuta
                - Trilobita
          - Conciliterga
