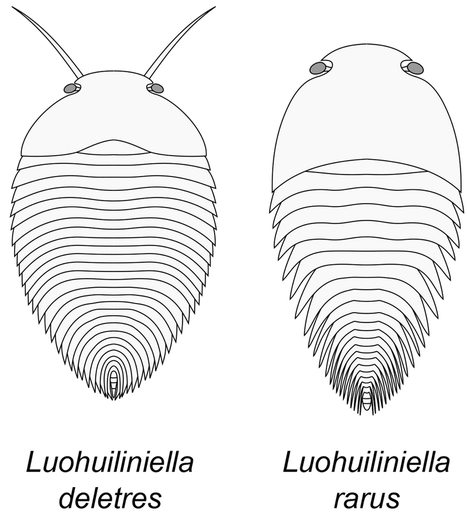

Scientific classification
- Kingdom: Animalia
- Phylum: Arthropoda
- Clade: †Artiopoda
- Order: †Xandarellida
- Genus: †Luohuilinella; Zhang et al. 2012

Type species
- Luohuilinella rarus Zhang et al. 2012

Other species
- Luohuilinella deletres Hou et al, 2018

= Luohuilinella =

Luohuilinella Temporal range: Cambrian stage 3

Genus of arthropods (fossil)

Luohuilinella is an extinct genus of xandarellid artiopodan arthropod known from the Chengjiang biota of China. The type species Luohuilinella rarus was described in 2012. A second species Luohuilinella deletres was described in 2018. Both taxa are rare components of the assemblage. Like other Xandarellids and most artiopodans, it possessed an unmineralised exoskeleton. The type and currently only known specimen of L. rarus is known from a dorsal exoskeleton, around 17 mm long and 9 mm wide which consists of 27 tergites with pronounced pleural spines. L. deletres is much larger, with specimens being over 10 cm long, L. deletres possessed at least 11 pairs of biramous appendages. Both taxa are dorsoventrally flattened, making a benthic or nektobenthic lifestyle probable. Both taxa have pronounced notches in the cephalon to accommodate the stalked eyes.
