= Haifengella =

Haifengella Temporal range: Early Cambrian

Scientific classification
- Kingdom: Animalia
- Phylum: Arthropoda
- Clade: †Artiopoda
- Family: †Helmetiidae
- Genus: †Haifengella; Zheo et al., 2014

Type species
- †Haifengella corona Zhao et al., 2014

Haifengella corona is the only known species of the extinct arthropod genus Haifengella, described in 2014 from the Early Cambrian Chengjiang Lagerstätte in Yunnan, China. It is a helmetiid arthropod closely related to trilobites, notable for its crown-like pygidium (tail shield) that inspired its species name. It belongs to the extinct order Helmetiida within the clade Conciliterga, a group of trilobite-like artiopods. Name origin: The genus name Haifengella comes from Haifeng village near the fossil site; the species epithet corona (Latin for “crown”) refers to the crown-shaped outline of its pygidium. Haifengella has six thoracic tergites and two pairs of tail spines. Each of the thoracic tergites exhibits a pair of long spines projecting from the posterolateral corners.

In 2025, Losso, Caron Ortega-Hernández in their reanalysis of Helmetia expansa recovered Haifengella as a sister taxon of Rhombicalvaria.
