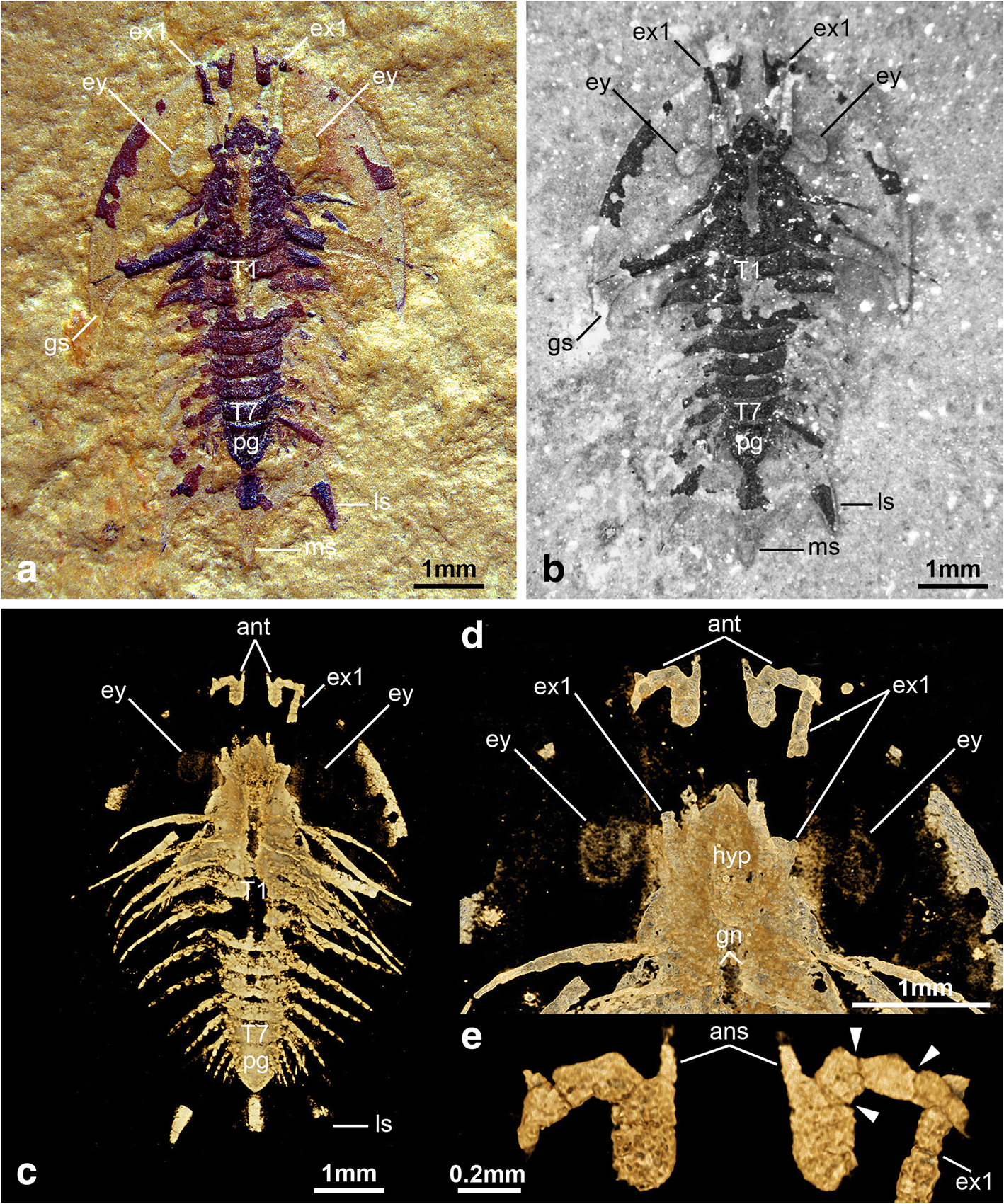

Scientific classification
- Kingdom: Animalia
- Phylum: Arthropoda
- Clade: †Artiopoda
- Order: †Xandarellida
- Genus: †Sinoburius; Hou et al. 1991
- Species: †S. lunaris

Binomial name
- †Sinoburius lunaris Hou et al. 1991

= Sinoburius =

Sinoburius Temporal range: Cambrian stage 3

Extinct genus of Cambrian animals

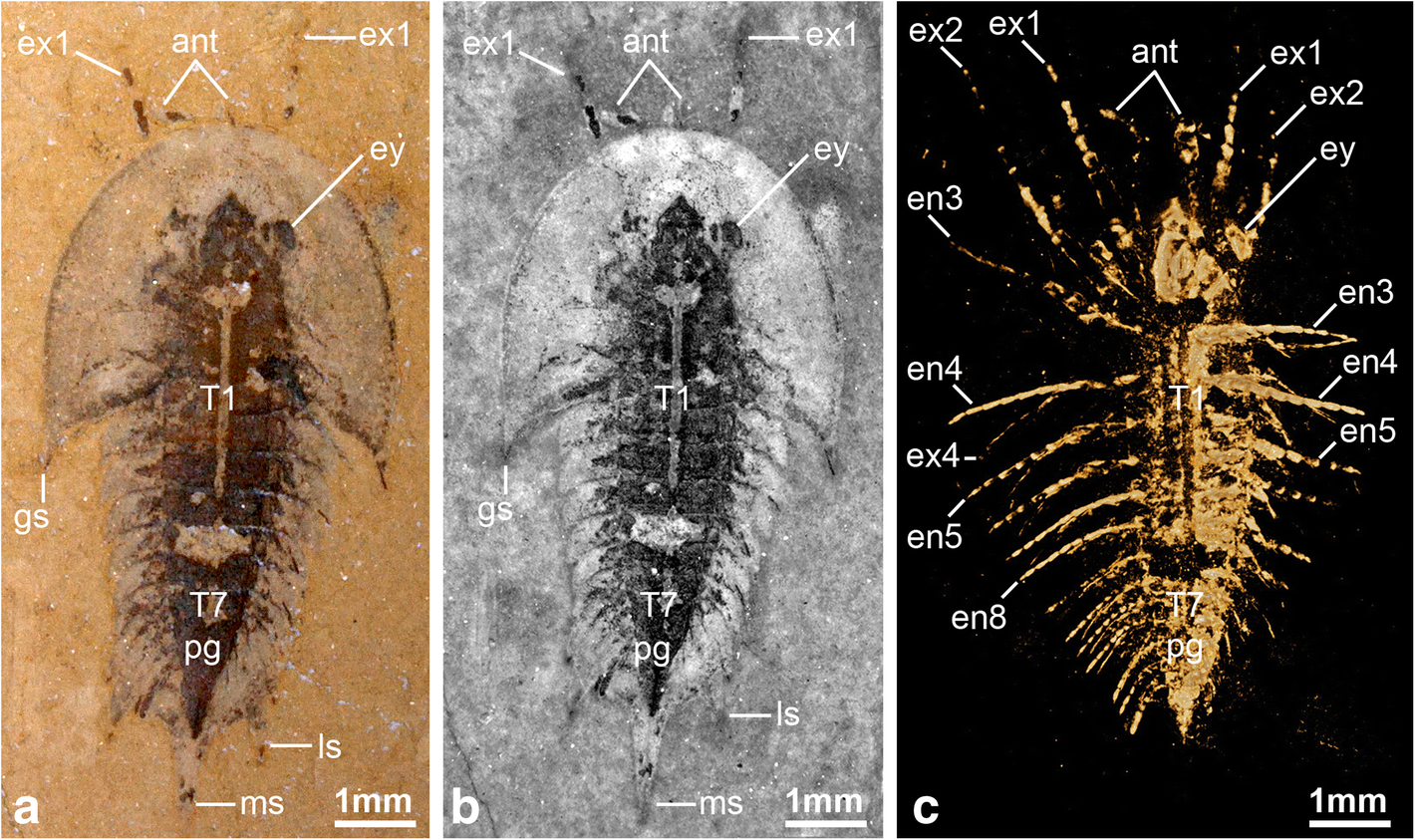

Sinoburius is an extinct genus of xandarellid artiopodan known from the Cambrian aged Chengjiang Biota of China. It is only known from the type species S. lunaris, which was described in 1991. It is a rare fossil within the Chengjiang assemblage. Like other Xandarellids, Sinoburius has an unmineralised exoskeleton. Adult individuals are around 7-8 millimetres in length, with stalked eyes present on the ventral side. Unusually among artiopods, the antennae are strongly reduced in size.

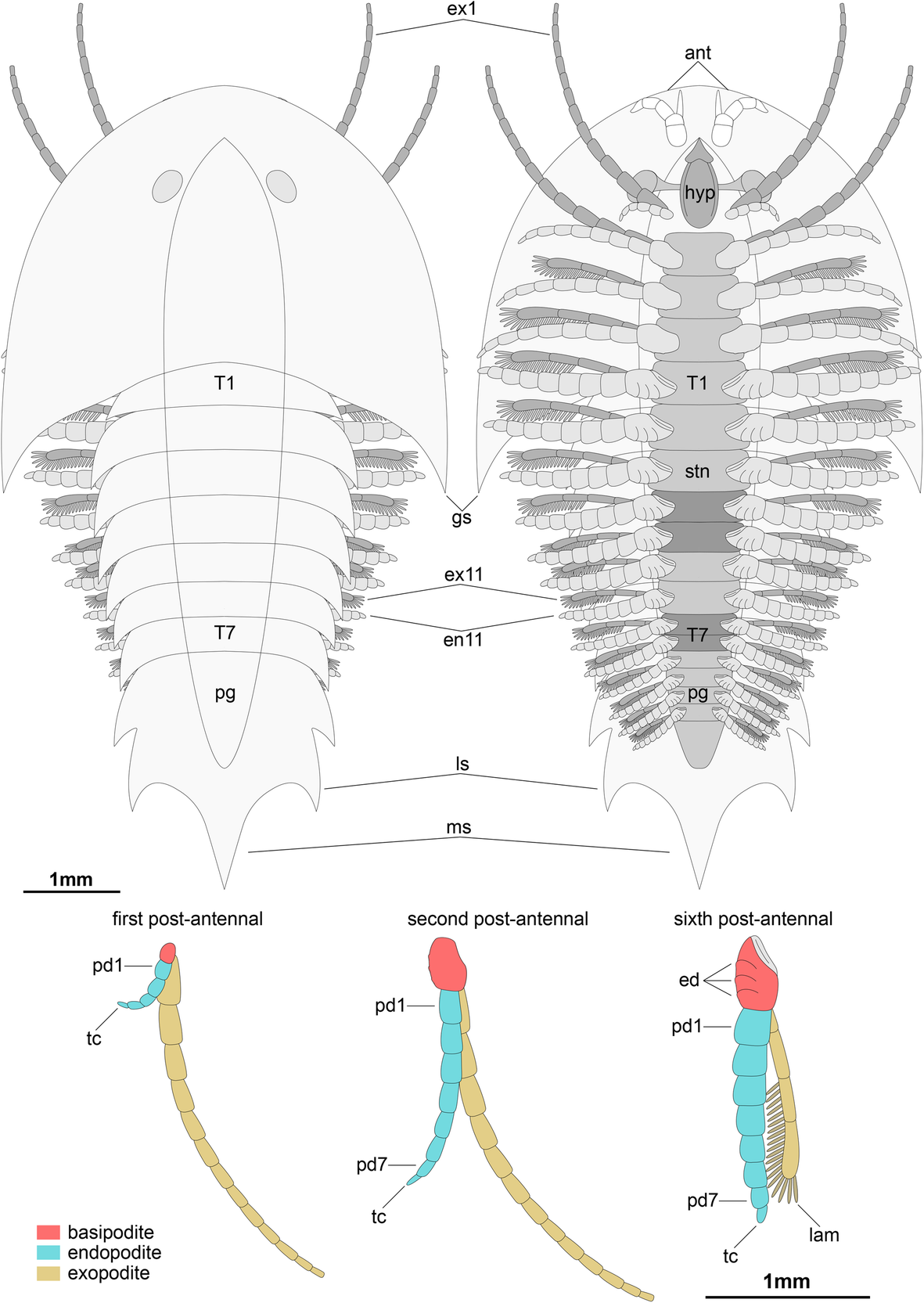
Reconstruction, in dorsal and ventral views
