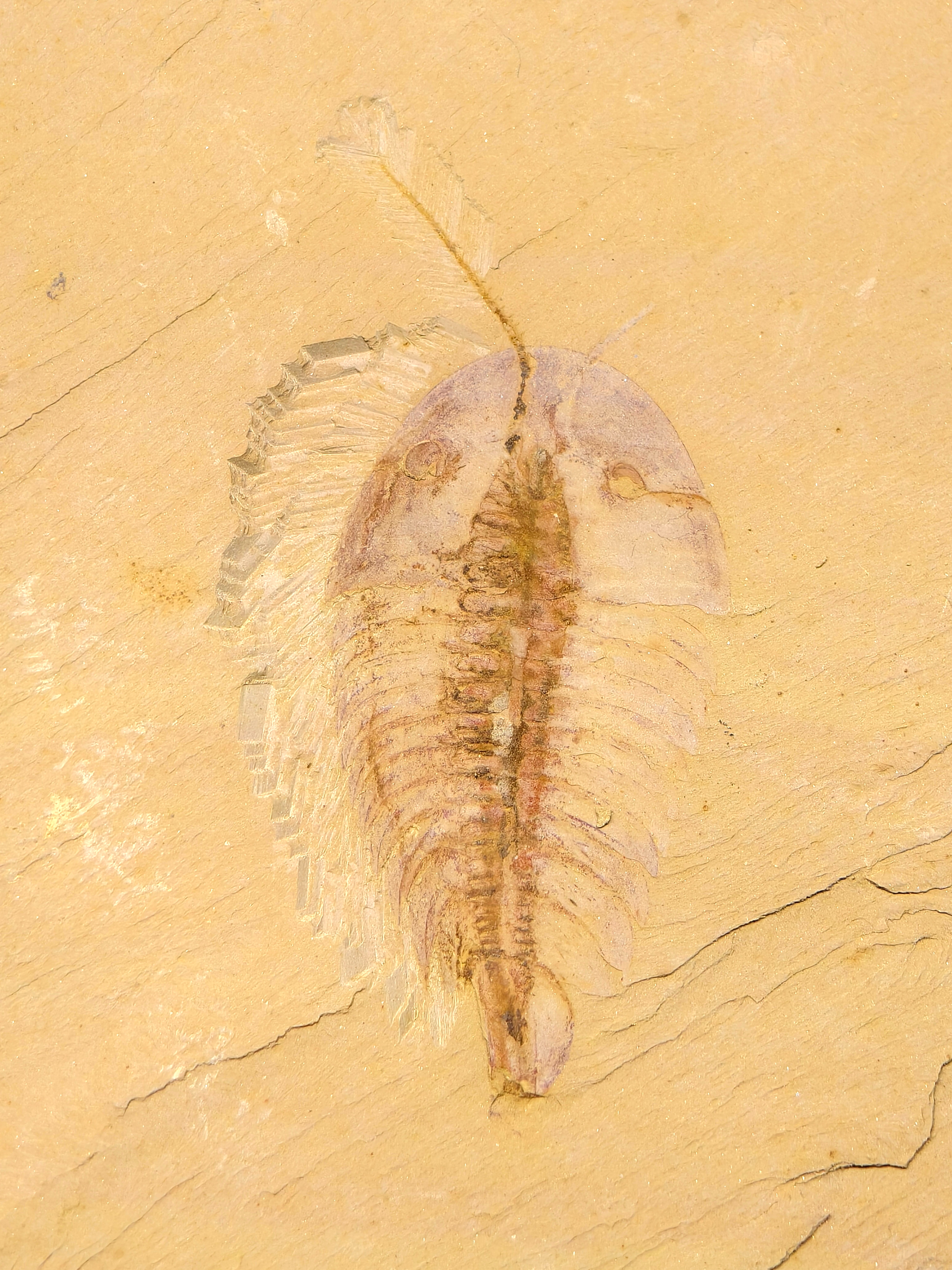
- Fossil of X. spectaculum

Scientific classification
- Kingdom: Animalia
- Phylum: Arthropoda
- Clade: †Artiopoda
- Order: †Xandarellida
- Genus: †Xandarella; Hou et al. 1991

Type species
- Xandarella spectaculum Hou et al. 1991

= Xandarella =

Xandarella Temporal range: Cambrian stage 3

Genus of arthropods (fossil)

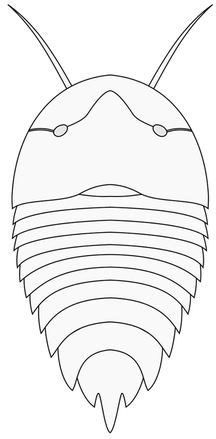
Drawing of Xandarella

Xandarella is an extinct genus of xandarellid artiopodan known from the Cambrian of China, the type species Xandarella spectaculum was described in 1991 from the Cambrian Stage 3 aged Chengjiang Biota in China. Although an additional species Xandarella mauretanica was described from the Cambrian Stage 5 Tatelt Formation in Morocco in 2017, which preserved only the ventral anatomy, it is later found that is a species of trilobite Gigoutella instead. Like other xandarellids, the exoskeleton is unmineralised. The cephalon has pronounced eye slits, presumably derived from ancestral ventral stalked eyes.
