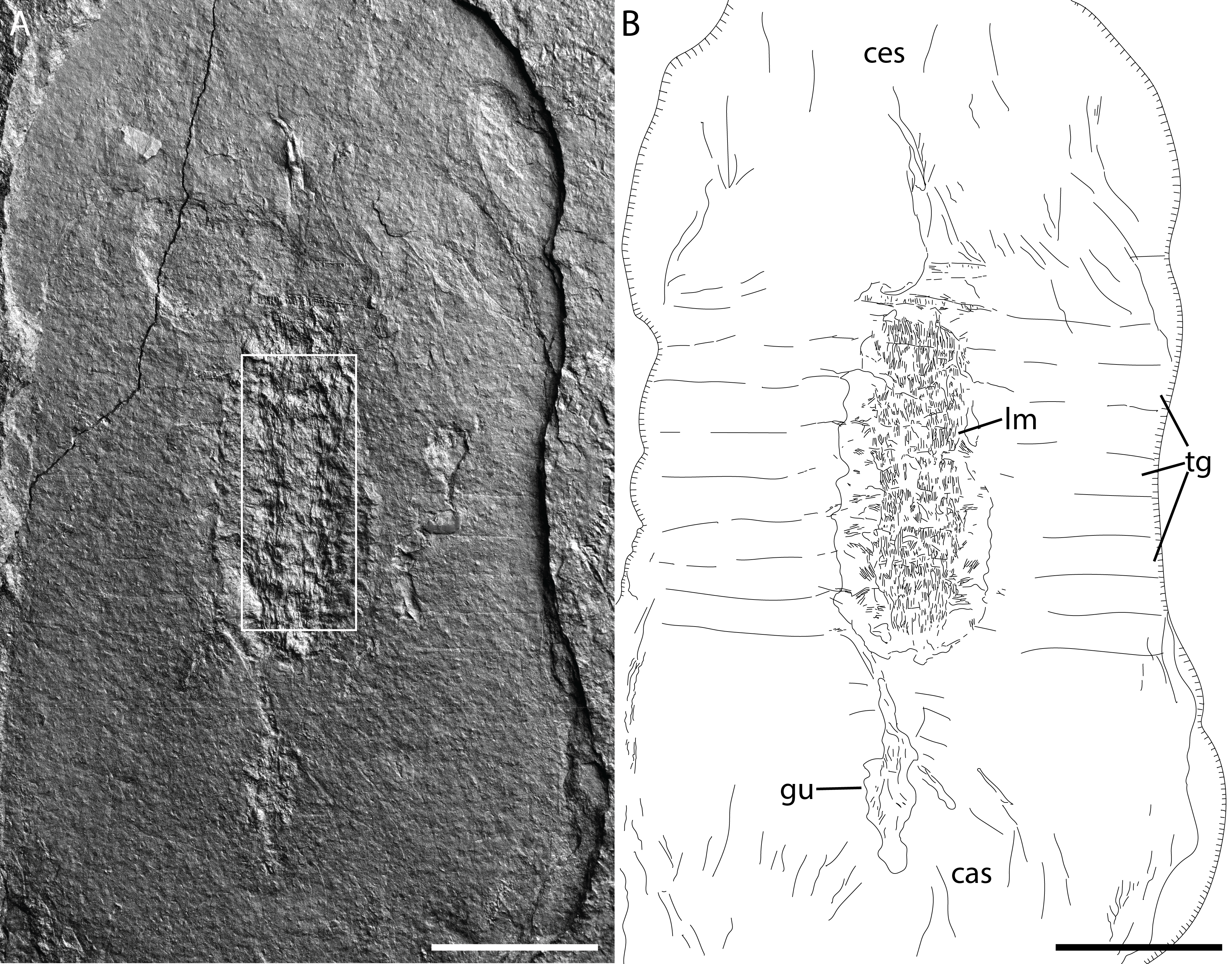
- Fossil of Campanamuta with preserved musculature

Scientific classification
- Kingdom: Animalia
- Phylum: Arthropoda
- Clade: †Artiopoda
- Genus: †Campanamuta; Budd, 2011
- Species: †C. mantonae

Binomial name
- †Campanamuta mantonae Budd, 2011

= Campanamuta =

Campanamuta Temporal range: Cambrian Stage 3

Extinct genus of artiopod

Campanamuta is a genus of artiopod from the Sirius Passet of Greenland. It contains one species, Campanamuta mantonae. This genus is known from around 40 specimens, mostly complete and preserving internal anatomy. It was likely a benthic predator, which lived in the twilight zone of the ocean.

Its name derives from the Latin words campana "bell" and mutus "dumb", in reference to the taxon's field name being "dumbbell". The species name mantonae honours Sidnie Manton, "one of the foremost arthropod workers of the 20th century".

== Description ==
Campanamuta is fairly large, around 6 cm in length. Its head shield is semi-elliptical and smooth, with a narrow wrinkled border along its front edge. The posterior corners are round and extend slightly behind the occipital tergite (second segment), with the shield being somewhat wider than it. The occipital tergite fits into a trapezoidal embayment (recess) in the head shield. Two lobed structures are preserved in the head region, which may represent ventral eyes like in other Cambrian artiopods. No hypostome is preserved, and the only evidence for a doublure is a faint line along the forward margin of the head shield. The thorax is composed of nine segments, and is about as long as the head shield is wide. The tergites (back plates) on each are split into two lateral and an axial region, with all being roughly the same sizes. The margins of these tergites are fairly simple, with minimal articulation and slight overlapping. The caudal shield is similar to the head shield, however it is only composed of one unit, and has an "scalloped" posterior margin due to around fourteen broad spines. The caudal shield also seems to cover multiple segments, as six linear features are arranged around the body axis of the shield in one specimen.

Campanamuta has at least fifteen appendages; a pair of antennae, five pairs of head limbs and nine pairs on the body. The antennae are long and slender with at least twenty segments, although as they are inserted near the centre of the cephalic shield only a small portion extends outside it. These antennae are accompanied by a poorly preserved brush-like structure at their base, likely representing musculature. The cephalic and thoracic limbs are almost identical except for a gradual increase in size, and while no exopods are preserved this is also seen in fossils of nektaspids with biramous limbs from the Maotianshan Shales. These limbs are also preserved merely as impressions in the rock, with any podomeres preserved being too faint to be useful.

=== Internal anatomy ===
One of the most remarkable traits of Campanamuta's fossils is the fact they preserve most of the internal anatomy, a trait only shared by a few other arthropods like the enigmatic Keurbos. These are divided into two sections; dorsal and ventral. The dorsal section contains several long apodemes, preserved as thin structures on the boundaries of tergite axes. They are triangular in shape and flattened dorsoventrally (up-and-down), with a thin ridge extending down their length. As their tips are occasionally preserved away from the axial boundaries it can be assumed the tips were not connected to the outer exoskeleton, and so the apodemes curved downwards. These apodemes are associated with thin bands of longitudinal muscle, which run down to around halfway along the caudal shield. These muscles were likely attached to the underside of the exoskeleton.

The gut is preserved as a tube-like structure along the middle of the animal. The foregut contains an esophagus and stomach, with the esophagus being a tapered tube which was likely sclerotised, and various views of it suggesting the esophagus looped down to the organism's underside before rising up to meet the stomach. The stomach is preserved as a concave oval structure, ending at the front of the occipital tergite. Two small lobe-like structures are preserved at its front edge, and while this is the position where a hypostome would normally be the structure seems to be internal due to it always being concave. The stomach also is located just behind the antennae, in a similar position to that of naraoiids or trilobites. The rear of the stomach extends into another tube which ends around halfway down the caudal shield, with the anus marked by a ring of fibres (possibly muscle). Around the gut, musculature is preserved as an amorphous structure. This musculature mostly consists of transverse fibres with other short fibres running off of them longitudinally. The muscles seem to attach to the body wall, with the longitudinal fibres attaching to the top of the apodemes.

The ventral structure is harder to interpret, due to its unfamiliarity. A set of robust triangular structures are situated along the body axis, with transverse ridged folds attached to these in turn. The folds open out into channels away from the axis, which are formed by interconnected chambers. Within the folds several gut diverticula are preserved, these protruding just out of the folds into the channels. These diverticula are oval in shape, with wrinkled sheets covering their surface.

== Palaeobiology ==
Campanamuta was likely benthic, as its external morphology is quite simple with mainly undifferentiated limbs. While its tergites do articulate somewhat, this is very minor and it likely was not able to enroll itself. The head appendages likely passed food to the mouth, although they do not seem to have had gnathobases. The gut provides further evidence of diet, as the well-developed gut diverticula suggest a predatory lifestyle where it consumed large amounts of food at once.
