= Skioldia =

Skioldia Temporal range: Early Cambrian

Scientific classification
- Kingdom: Animalia
- Phylum: Arthropoda
- Clade: †Artiopoda
- Subphylum: †Trilobitomorpha
- Subclass: †Conciliterga
- Genus: †Skioldia; Hou and Bergström, 1997
- Species: †S. aldna

Binomial name
- †Skioldia aldna Hou and Bergström, 1997

Monotypic genus of extinct arthropods

Skioldia is a monotypic genus of extinct arthropods from the Early Cambrian Chengjiang Lagerstätte of Yunnan, China. Described in 1997 by Hou Xian-guang and Jan Bergström, its sole species is Skioldia aldna. It is classified within the subclass Conciliterga.
