= Eozetetes =

Eozetetes Temporal range: Cambrian Stage 4

Scientific classification
- Kingdom: Animalia
- Phylum: Arthropoda
- Clade: †Artiopoda
- (unranked): †Vicissicaudata
- Genus: †Eozetetes; Edgecombe et al, 2016
- Species: †E. gemmelli

Binomial name
- †Eozetetes gemmelli Edgecombe et al, 2016

Extinct genus of Cambrian arthropod

Eozetetes is a genus of vicissicaudatan artiopod from the Emu Bay Shale of Australia. It contains one species, Eozetetes gemmelli.

== Description ==
Eozetetes is roughly 3 cm long, with the tail spine making up half of this. The cephalic shield is semicircular with no genal spines and a relatively wide doublure. The hypostome is attached to the doublure, with a vaguely nose-like shape preserved extending most of the cephalic shield's length. Only one antenna is preserved, with it being long and flagelliform (whip-like) with only slight tapering. Several joints are preserved, with each segment roughly the same size. The trunk has 18 tergites (segments) with the second being widest. These tergites are distinctly three-lobed, with the axis being set apart by a break in the slope. The tergopleurae (part of the tergite which is not the axis) are broad with gently curved anterolateral margins and acute tips, which markedly narrow from the tenth tergite onwards alongside becoming more curved and pointed. The tergites also overlap abaxially, with a pair of nodes on the first 13 becoming more keel-shaped up to the eighteenth tergite. The last tergite is seemingly ring-shaped with no nodes or tergopleurae. The tail spine is about as wide as this last tergite, sharply tapering in the first 3 mm and then remaining a constant width. This large anterior section also bears a keel-like ridge. Eozetetes closely resembles Emeraldella, Carimersa and aglaspidids (in fact being related to these last two), however features such as a differing amount of tergopleurae, a lack of caudal flaps and apparent lack of an articulated tailspine set it apart from the former, with the lack of a mineralised exoskeleton setting it apart from aglaspidids.

== Etymology ==
The genus name Eozetetes translates to "early searcher", which alongside the species name gemmelli honours Mike Gemmell, a member of the paper authors' field team, for moving vast quantities of Emu Bay Shale rocks alongside discovering numerous superb specimens.

== Taxonomy ==
Eozetetes has been placed within the clade Vicissicaudata, a subgroup of Artiopoda, the clade containing trilobites and their close relatives. Within Vicissicaudata, it has often been placed as a close relative of Aglaspidida. Cladogram after McCoy et al. 2025:

- - Vicissicaudata
    - Molaria spinifera
    - - Emeraldella brocki
      - - Emeraldella brutoni
        - - - Sidneyia inexpectans
            - - Tardisia broedeae
              - Cheloniellida
          - - Carimersa neptuni
            - - Kodymirus vagans
              - - Eozetetes gemelli
                - Aglaspidida
