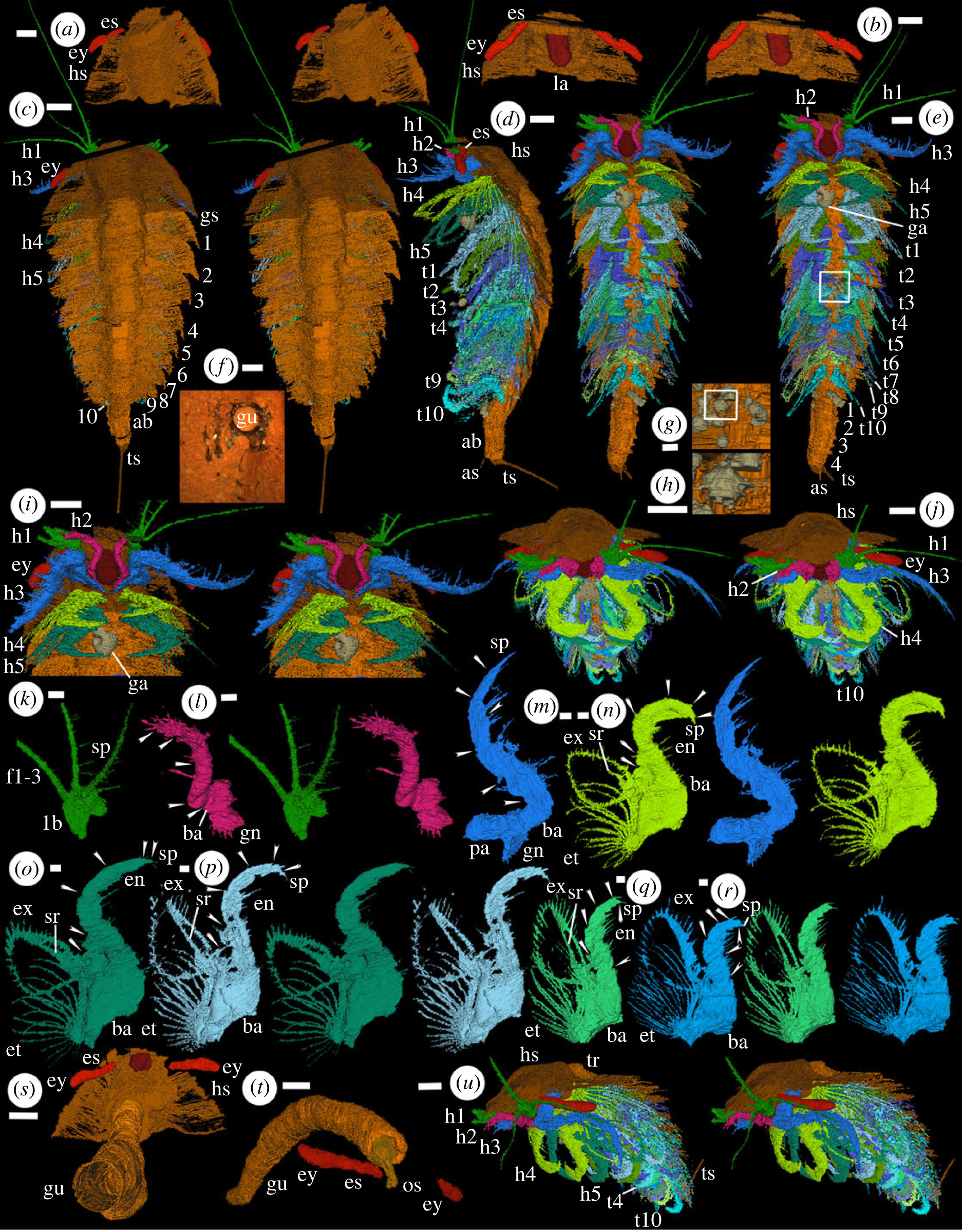

Scientific classification
- Kingdom: Animalia
- Phylum: Arthropoda
- Clade: †Artiopoda
- Superclass: †Vicissicaudata
- Genus: †Carimersa; Briggs et al. 2023

Type species
- Carimersa neptuni Briggs et al. 2023

= Carimersa =

Carimersa Temporal range: Homerian

Extinct genus of artiopodan

Carimersa is an extinct genus of artiopodan arthropod known from the Silurian Coalbrookdale Formation of Herefordshire, England.

== Description ==
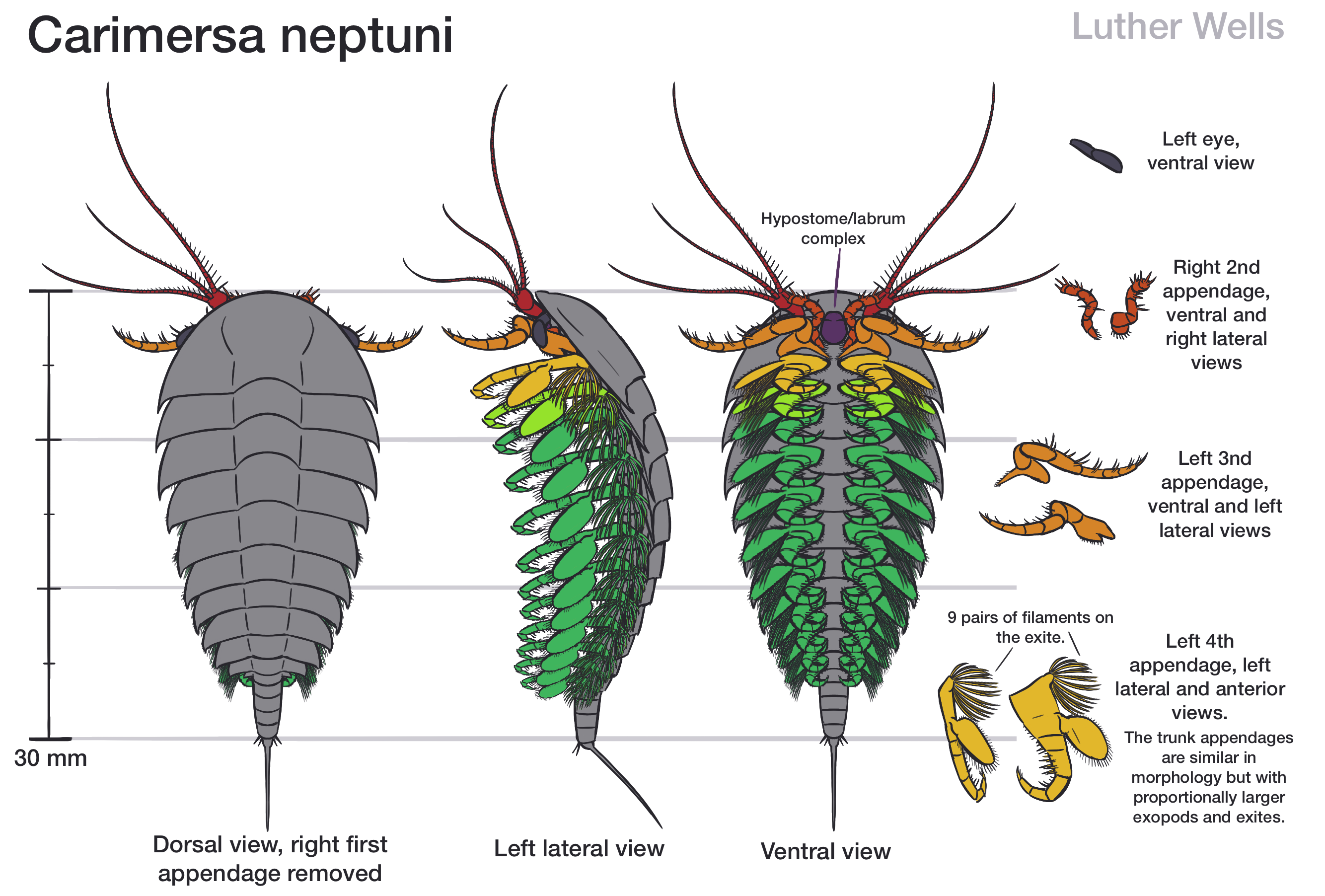
Diagrammatic reconstruction of Carimersa neptuni

The body is flattened, and divided into the head with five pairs of paired appendages, the trunk with 10 appendage-bearing segments, a limbless abdomen with 4 segments, with the body terminating with tailspine. The total length of the body excluding the tailspine is around 3 centimetres (1.2 in), with a max width of about 1.25 centimetres (0.49 in). The first antennae-like head appendage bears three flagellae-like structures. The second and third head appendages are uniramous and have basipods (basal segments) modified into spined gnathobases (used to process food). The last two head appendages and the trunk limbs are biramous, and have robust endopods that bear spines, with the exopods being flap-like and reinforced by a rod-like structure.

== Ecology ==
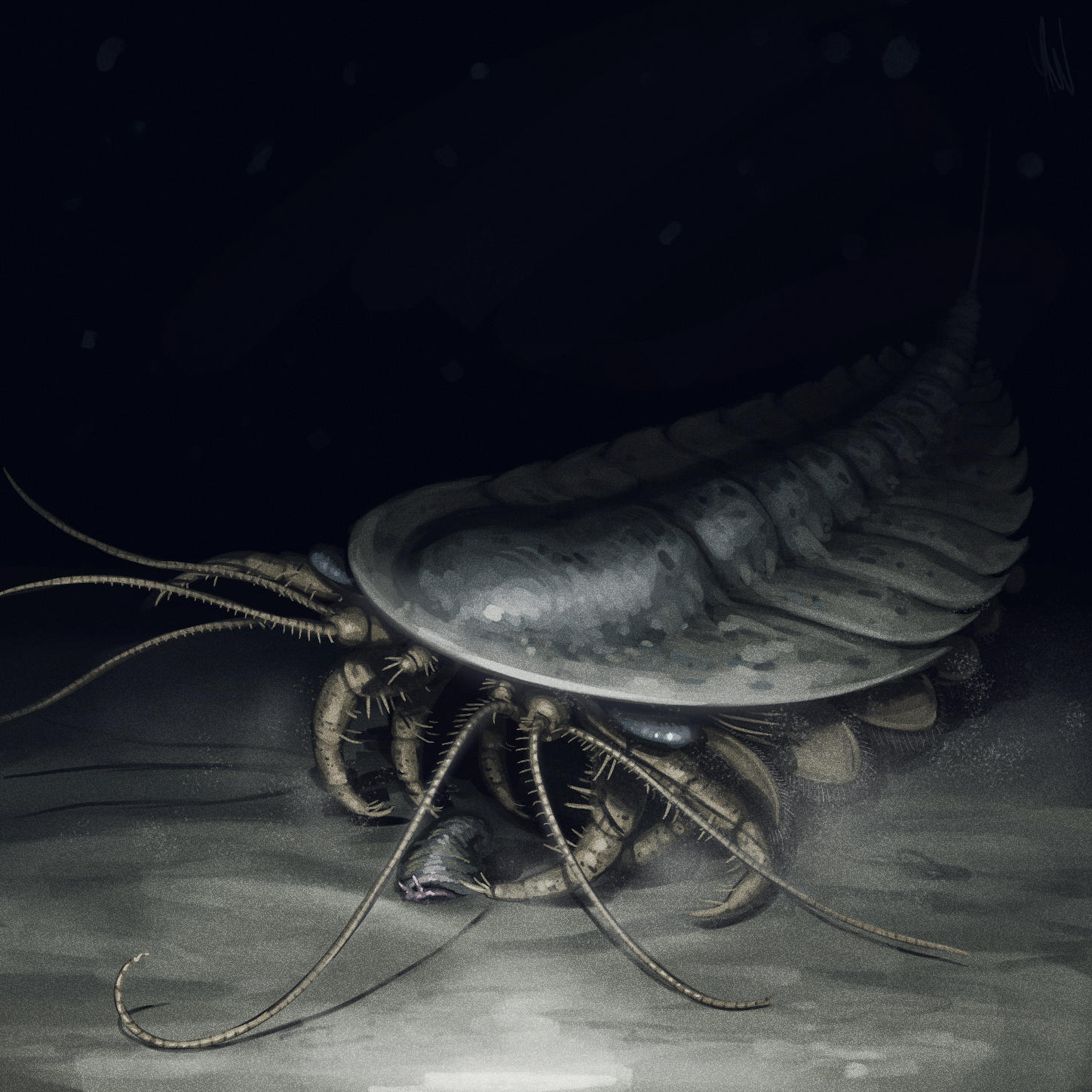
Life reconstruction of a Carimersa neptuni hunting a Platyceratid

Carimersa was likely an actively swimming organism that probably swam close to the sediment surface. The presence of associated shelly microfossils of radiolarians and gastropods suggests that it may have been a microdurophagous predator, using the spines on its limb endopods to capture prey and move it towards the mouth, where it would be processed by the gnathobases on the second and third head appendages before being ingested.

== Taxonomy ==
Carimersa has been placed as a member of Vicissicaudata within Artiopoda, more closely related to Aglaspidida, Kodymirus and Eozetetes than to Cheloniellida, Sidneyia or Emeraldella. Cladogram after McCoy et al. 2025:

- - Vicissicaudata
    - Molaria spinifera
    - - Emeraldella brocki
      - - Emeraldella brutoni
        - - - Sidneyia inexpectans
            - - Tardisia broedeae
              - Cheloniellida
          - - Carimersa neptuni
            - - Kodymirus vagans
              - - Eozetetes gemelli
                - Aglaspidida
