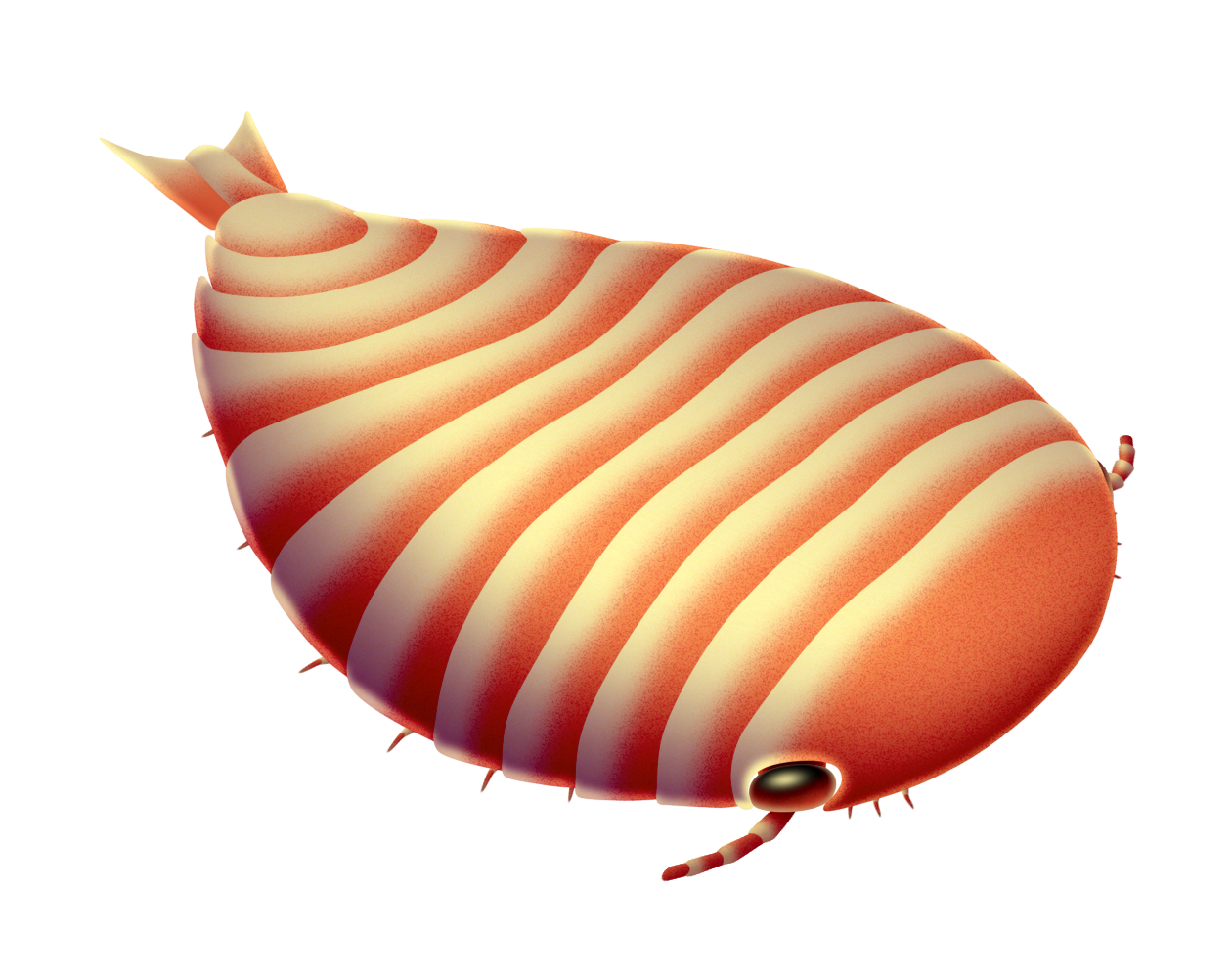
- Sidneyia minor, a vicissicaudatan unplaced in any subgroup
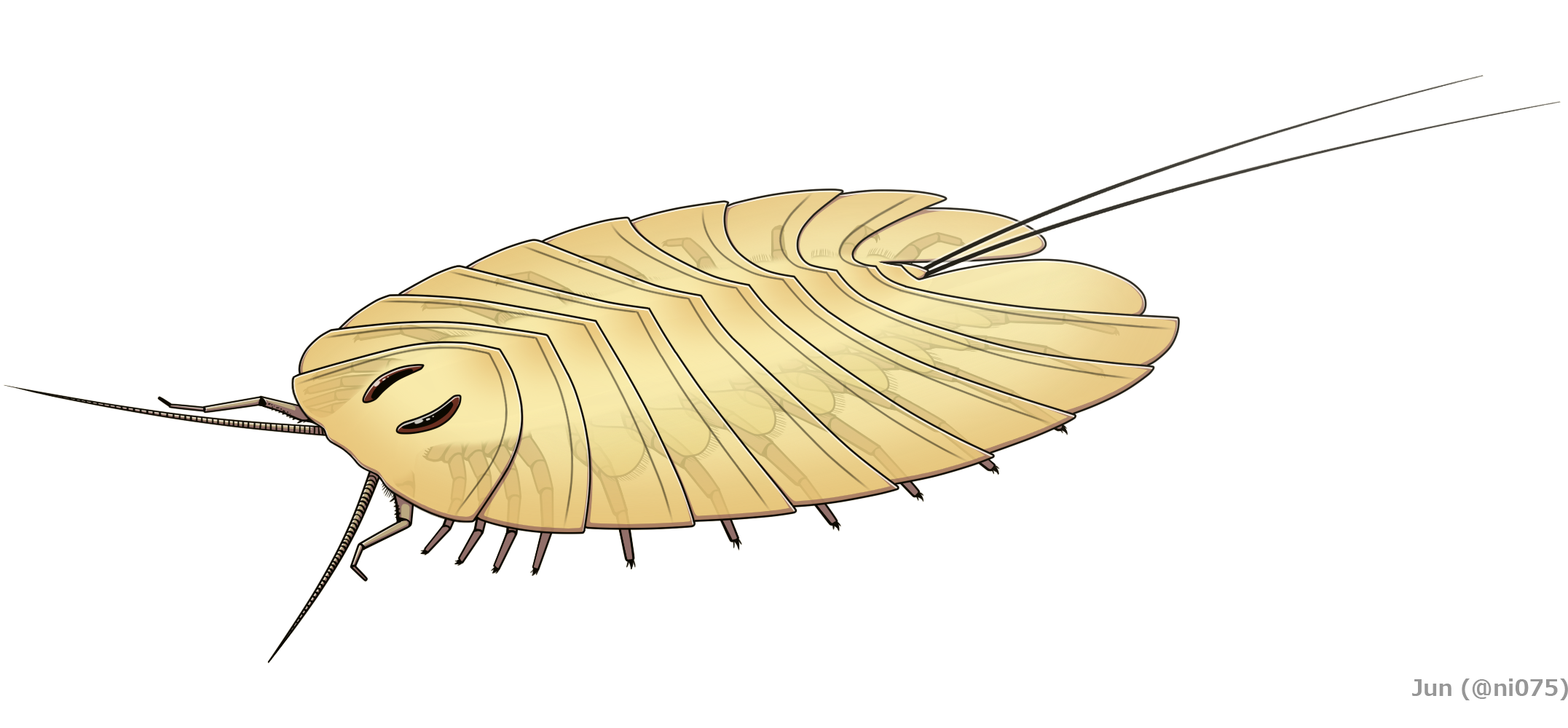
- Cheloniellon, a cheloniellid

Scientific classification
- Kingdom: Animalia
- Phylum: Arthropoda
- Clade: †Artiopoda
- Superclass: †Vicissicaudata; Ortega-Hernández, Legg & Braddy, 2013

Subgroupings
- †Etainia; †Kodymirus; †Sidneyia; †Emeraldella; †Eozetetes; †Tardisia; †Carimersa; †Molaria?; †Acanthomeridion?; †Cheloniellida; †Aglaspidida

Synonyms
- Xenopoda Raymond, 1935 (in part)

= Vicissicaudata =

Vicissicaudata Temporal range: Early Cambrian - Late Carboniferous

Extinct group of artiopods

Vicissicaudata is an unranked group of artiopodan arthropods, containing Cheloniellida, the speciose Aglaspidida, and several other genera outside these groups, such as Sidneyia and Emeraldella.

== Description ==
Vicissicaudatans are similar to most other artiopods in shape, with rounded bodies consisting of many wide tergites, sometimes with a distinguishable axis along the midline. This clade is defined by a differentiated posterior region, often ending in a telson and caudal appendages. The morphology of this posterior region varies between clades. Aglaspidids, alongside Eozetetes and Carimersa, have long styliform telsons and relatively small, flap-like caudal appendages while cheloniellids and Tardisia have much longer caudal appendages similar to the caudal furcae of various taxa, alongside much smaller telsons more resembling the postabdominal segments. The paraphyletic "xenopods" are more similar to those of aglaspidids, also with long telsons and flap-like caudal appendages, however in Sidneyia the caudal appendages have become large with broad, lobed tips. In terms of bodily morphology, aglaspidids and Carimersa closely resemble trilobites, with cheloniellids having an unusual radial arrangement of their tergopleurae. The various basal taxa are mostly less derived in body shape with rounded tergite edges and large head shields, although the first appendage pair of Kodymirus vaguely resembles the frontal appendages of radiodonts. Most have eyes, although some later aglaspidids and cheloniellids, alongside Tardisia and Etainia, seem to lack them. However, the placement of eyes varies throughout Vicissicaudata, with some having eyes on the underside of their carapace (such as Emeraldella), so the apparent lack of eyes may simply be due to them not being visible on fossils. Unlike trilobites, most vicissicaudatans are not biomineralised, therefore they are much rarer and mainly appear in lagerstätten.

== Distribution ==
Vicissicaudatans seem to have a wide distribution both in time and space, with fossils being recorded from the Cambrian to the Carboniferous. Fossils have been found in locations including but not limited to the Burgess Shale, Wheeler Shale, Chengjiang biota, Paseky Shale, Emu Bay Shale, Fezouata Formation, Llanfallteg Formation, Coalbrookdale Formation, Hunsrück Slate and Mazon Creek.

== Taxonomy ==
Sidneyia and Emeraldella were recognised to be closely related to each other since the early 20th century, with the order "Xenopoda" being erected to house the two genera in 1935. A close relationship between Sidneyia, Emeraldella, aglaspididans and cheloniellids had long been hypothesised, but the grouping lacked a formal name until 2013. Vicissicaudata is often considered to be closely related to the clade containing trilobites and their close relatives (Trilobitomorpha) as part of Artiopoda, though some studies hypothesise that Artiopoda is paraphyletic, with some studies hypothesising that Vicissicaudata is more closely related to other arthropod groups like chelicerates than to trilobitomorphs.

Cladogram after McCoy et al. 2025:

- - Vicissicaudata
    - Molaria spinifera
    - - Emeraldella brocki
      - - Emeraldella brutoni
        - - - Sidneyia inexpectans
            - - Tardisia broedeae
              - Cheloniellida
          - - Carimersa neptuni
            - - Kodymirus vagans
              - - Eozetetes gemelli
                - Aglaspidida

Cladogram after Lerosey-Aubril et al. (2017).

- Vicissicaudata
  - Sidneyia
  - - Cheloniellida
      - Neostrabops
      - - Cheloniellon
        - - Triopus
          - Duslia
    - - Emeraldella
      - - Kodymirus
        - - Eozetetes
          - Aglaspidida

Cladogram after Jiao et al. 2021.

- Vicissicaudata
  - Sidneyia inexpectans
  - - Emeraldella brocki
    - Cheloniellida
      - Cheloniellon calmani
      - - Triopus draboviensis
        - Duslia insignis
    - - Kodymirus vagans
      - - Eozetetes gemmelli
        - Aglaspidida
          - Beckwithia typa
          - - - Chlupacaris dubia
              - - Quasimodaspis brentsae
                - - Tremaglaspis unite
                  - - Tremaglaspis vanroyi
                    - Brachyaglaspis singularis
              - - Cyclopites vulgaris
                - Australaglaspis stonyensis
                - - Uarthrus instabilis
                  - Flobertia kochi
                  - - Aglaspella granulifera
                    - - Gogglops ensifer
                      - - Glypharthrus simplex
                        - Aglaspis spinifer
                    - - Chraspedops modesta
                      - - Glypharthrus thomasi
                        - - Glypharthrus trispinicaudatus
                          - Glypharthrus magnoculus

== Etymology ==
Vicissicaudata translates to "changed tail", in reference to the differentiation of the posterior body region in the group.
