= Etainia (artiopod) =

Etainia Temporal range: Darriwilian

Scientific classification
- Kingdom: Animalia
- Phylum: Arthropoda
- Clade: †Artiopoda
- (unranked): †Vicissicaudata
- Genus: †Etainia; Legg & Hearing, 2015

Type species
- Etainia howellsorum Legg & Hearing, 2015

Extinct genus of artiopodan

Etainia is an extinct genus of vicissicaudatan artiopod known from the Ordovician Llanfallteg Formation of Wales. Its type species is Etainia howellsorum. It shares its name with the moth genus Etainia (split off from a different genus earlier in 2015), therefore under Article 23 of the ICZN's code it is a homonym and technically invalid.

== Description ==
Etainia is known only from a partial specimen and an isolated appendage. The head consists of a semicircular sclerite, with no other features such as eyes or antennae preserved. Only a single cephalic appendage is known, composed of at least six podomeres decreasing in relative size towards the appendage tip, with long enditic spines on the first preserved podomere. The paratype (isolated appendage) shows at least seven podomeres (although the boundaries are hard to distinguish), alongside sharing the enditic spines. The trunk is poorly preserved, with only three tergites on the fossil. The second of these has a slight raised margin, suggesting an overlap with the third. In areas where these tergites are not preserved, appendages can be seen matching these tergites. The exopods have bulbous lobes fringed with overlapping lamellae, and these lamellar setae can also be seen in the cephalic region. The exopod is likely bipartite, due to the preservation of median setae further out. This is also evident on an appendage from further back on the body, with an ovoid exopod with evenly distributed setae along its margin. This exopod is attached to a poorly preserved proximal lobe, which is itself attached to a coxal bar giving the entire coxa a lacrimiform appearance.

== Taxonomy ==
Etainia somewhat resembles "xenopod" vicissicaudatans in appearance, therefore it is likely a member of the clade. Much like Sidneyia, Etainia bears a long coxal bar and long clusters of spine-like endites on its endopods. Bipartite exopods are a common feature in artiopods, with the rounded proximal lobes and lamellar setae resembling those of Retifacies (although that taxon does not have bipartite exopods). While the aglaspidid-like artiopod Kwanyinaspis also has ovoid exopods, however its distal setae differ in form from those of Etainia.

== Etymology ==
The genus name Etainia derives from Étaín, a mythical Celtic princess who "was reborn after being transformed into a butterfly and ingested by the wife of Étar", in reference both to the taxon being an arthropod and the large gap between it and other related forms. The species name howellsorum honours William and Sid Howells for "their support and devotion to the study of the geology of SW Wales".
