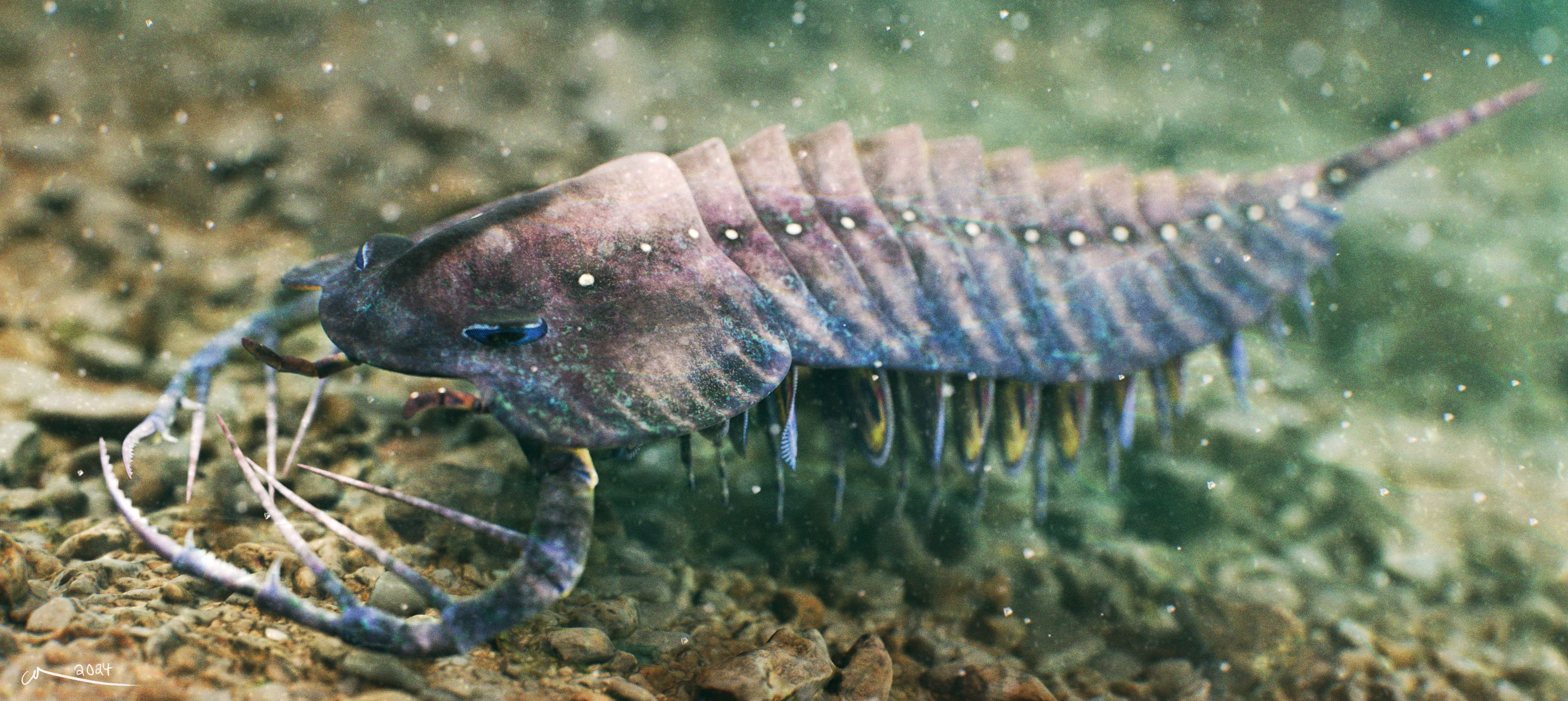
- Artist's restoration

Scientific classification
- Kingdom: Animalia
- Phylum: Arthropoda
- Clade: †Artiopoda
- Superclass: †Vicissicaudata
- Genus: †Kodymirus; Chlupáč & Havlíček, 1965
- Species: †K. vagans

Binomial name
- †Kodymirus vagans Chlupáč & Havlíček, 1965

= Kodymirus =

Kodymirus Temporal range: Cambrian Series 2 521–509 Ma

Extinct genus of arthropods

Kodymirus is an extinct genus of Early Cambrian arthropod, known from the Czech Republic. Although it possessed great appendage-like raptorial arms, it was not homologous with those of megacheirans. Kodymirus is currently considered a member of Vicissicaudata, closely related to aglaspidids, and more distantly to trilobites. It is part of a small and low-diversity Paseky Shale fauna group, which dwelt in brackish waters.

== Description ==
Kodymirus was a small predator at 80 mm (3.1 in) long. Its distinctive feature is pair of large, serrated raptorial appendages. These appendages appear convergent to those of megacheirans and radiodonts, but are not homologous as they are postantennular, suggesting raptorial arms evolved multiple times in Cambrian arthropods.

== Paleoecology ==
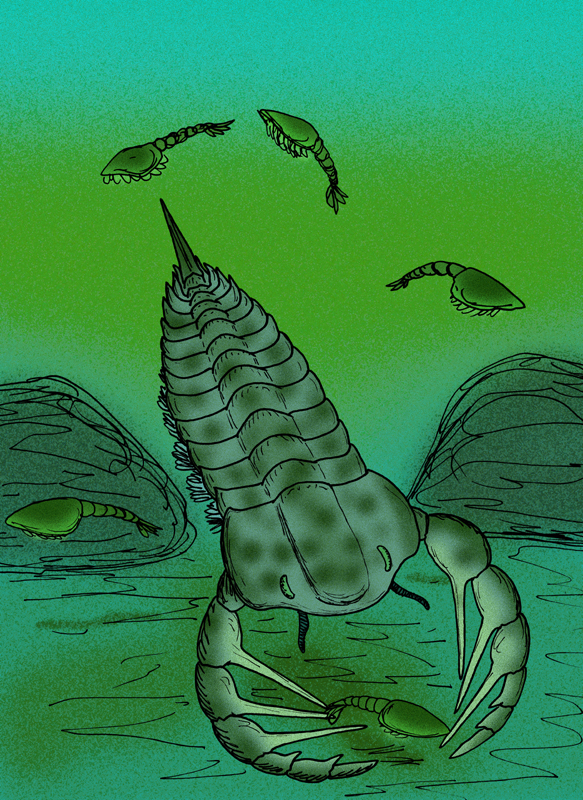
Restoration of Kodymirus vagans hunting prey in brackish waters

Kodymirus inhabited the Paseky Shale, within the modern day Czech Republic, which may be a shallow marine environment or brackish estuary. Trace fossils from the Shale have been interpreted as Kodymirus raking its claws along the sediment while swimming, disturbing benthic prey buried beneath the muck. This would make Kodymirus the earliest known arthropod predator in the intertidal zone.

== Taxonomy ==
Kodymirus was previously considered an enigmatic arthropod, and its precise taxonomic affinity remained uncertain. It was initially believed to be an early eurypterid and later a megacheiran. Kodymirus is currently been placed within the clade Vicissicaudata, a subgroup of Artiopoda, the clade containing trilobites and their close relatives. Within Vicissicaudata, it is generally considered closely related to the order Aglaspidida. Its basipods closely resembles those of the vicissicaudatan Emeraldella.

Cladogram after McCoy et al. 2025:

- - Vicissicaudata
    - Molaria spinifera
    - - Emeraldella brocki
      - - Emeraldella brutoni
        - - - Sidneyia inexpectans
            - - Tardisia broedeae
              - Cheloniellida
          - - Carimersa neptuni
            - - Kodymirus vagans
              - - Eozetetes gemelli
                - Aglaspidida
