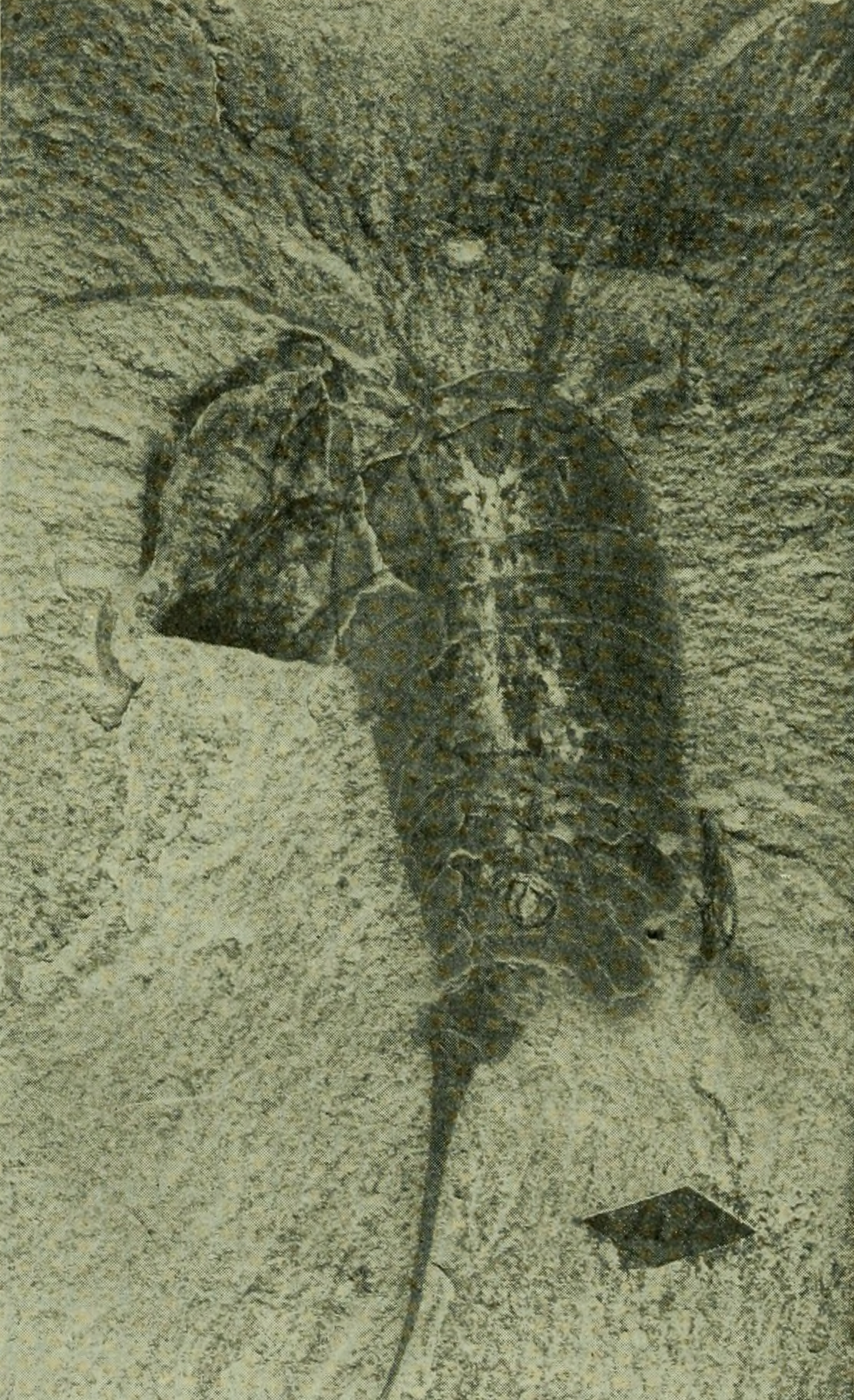
- Emeraldella brocki
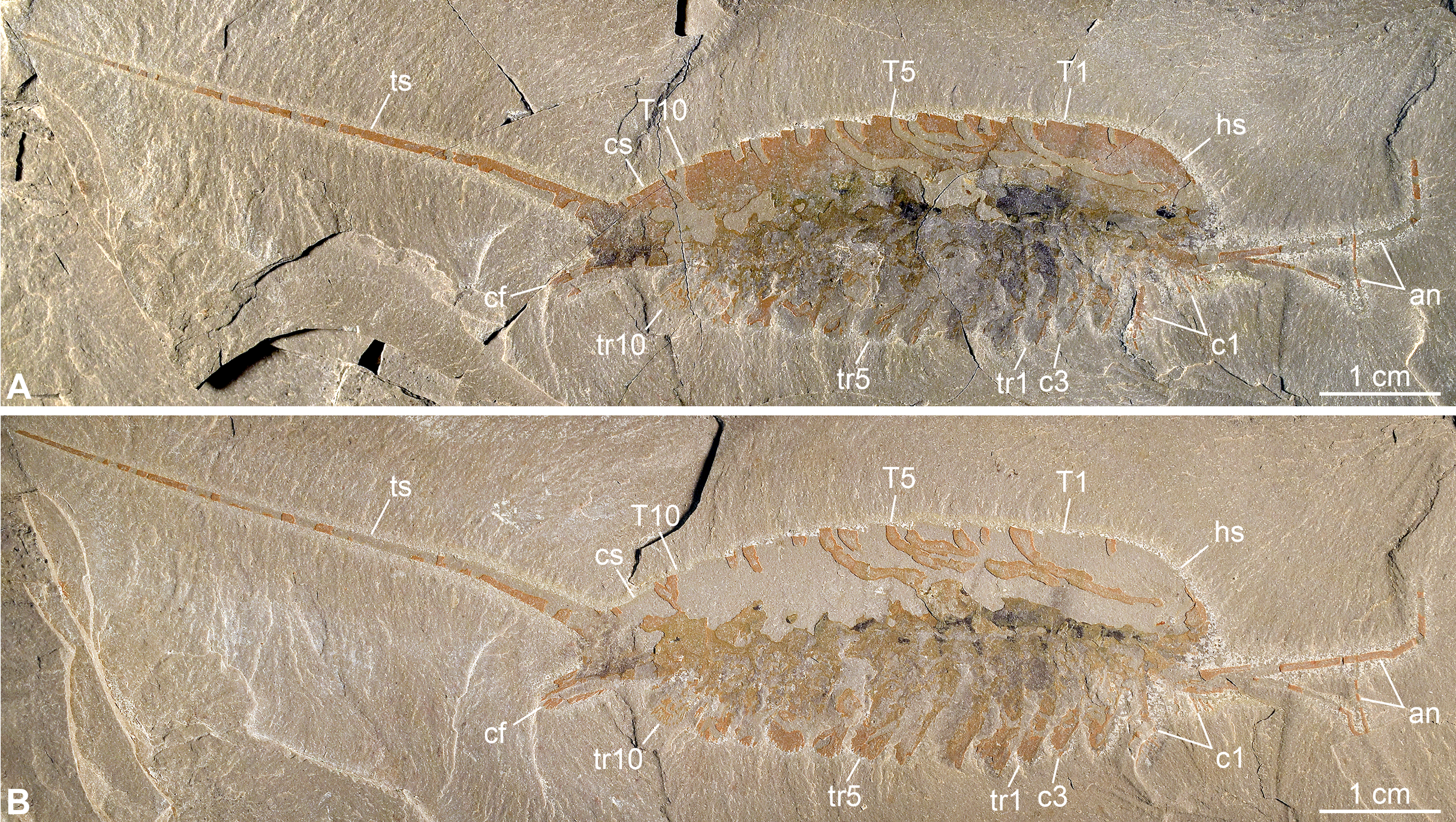
- Emeraldella brutoni

Scientific classification
- Kingdom: Animalia
- Phylum: Arthropoda
- Clade: †Artiopoda
- (unranked): †Vicissicaudata
- Genus: †Emeraldella; Walcott, 1912

Type species
- †Emeraldella brocki Walcott, 1912

Other species
- †Emeraldella brutoni Stein, Church & Robison, 2011

= Emeraldella =

Emeraldella Temporal range: Miaolingian–Drumian

Extinct genus of arthropods

Emeraldella is a genus of arthropod known from the Middle Cambrian of North America. The type species E. brocki was described in 1912 from the Burgess Shale. 21 specimens of Emeraldella are known from the Greater Phyllopod bed, where they comprise < 0.1% of the community. A re-study on the species was done in 2012. A second species E. brutoni is known from the Wheeler Shale, which was described in 2011. An additional specimen of E. brutoni was described in 2019, which revealed more of the anatomy. It has been placed as a basal member of the clade Vicissicaudata within Artiopoda, a group of arthropods containing trilobites and their relatives.

== Description ==
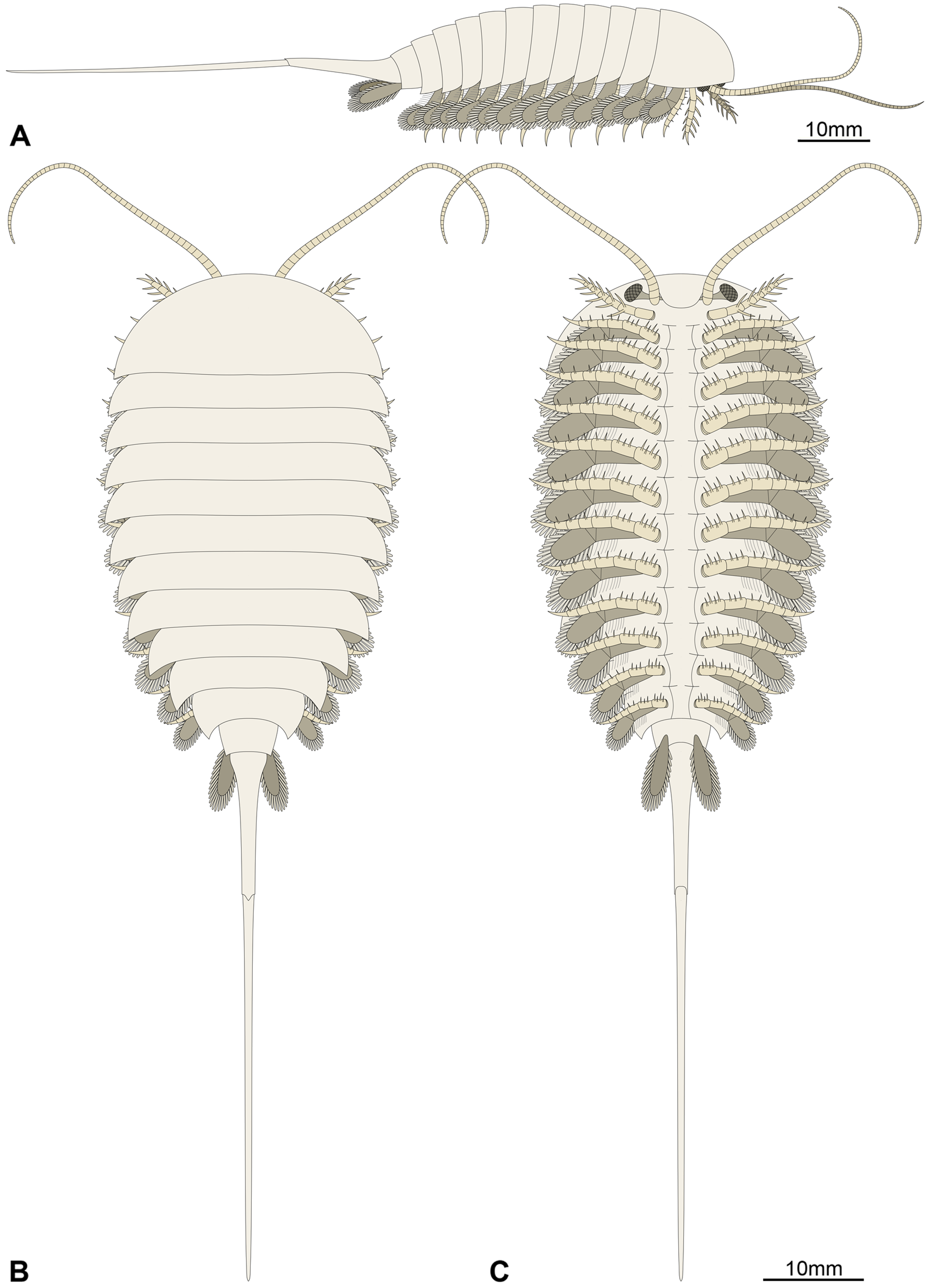
Reconstruction of Emeraldella brutoni

Emeraldella species reached around 5–6 centimetres (2.0–2.4 in) in length, excluding the long telson (tailspine) at the end of the body, which is longer than the trunk region of the body. The semicircular head bore an elongate pair of antennae, sometimes exceeding over 80 segments in E. brocki. Eyes were present in E. brutoni, but absent in E. brocki. The head has 3 pairs of post-antennae limbs, the first of which was uniramous (only composed of one branch), composed of an endopod (leg-like part) with nine segments/podomeres, which were covered in spines, while the other two pairs were biramous (two branched). The trunk is made up of 10 (in E. brutoni) or 11 in (E. brocki) segments/tergites, which have well developed pleurae, which are followed by a cylindrical segment to which "caudal flaps" attached, followed by the tailspine. Pairs of biramous (two branched) limbs run down the body. The shape of the segments (podomeres) of the endopods (inner, leg-like branch) of the biramous limbs strongly varied in proportion along the body length, the endopods generally curved outward towards where it attached to the body and then downwards near their tips at the fifth segment/podomere. The exopod (outer branch of the biramous limb) is paddle-shaped and divided into three segments, the one closest to the body was covered in lamellae, while the two further away were covered in setae (hair-like structures). The caudal flaps were modified exopods, and were also fringed with setae.

== Taxonomy ==
In 1923, Emeraldella was placed, along with Sidneyia, as part of the group "Xenopoda". Today, both Sidneyia and Emeraldella are placed as part of the clade Vicissicaudata within Artiopoda, which includes trilobites and other arthropods with similar bodyforms. However, Sidneyia and Emeraldella are usually not recovered as each others closest relatives within Vicissicaudata, rendering "Xenopoda" invalid.

Cladogram after McCoy et al. 2025:

- - Vicissicaudata
    - Molaria spinifera
    - - Emeraldella brocki
      - - Emeraldella brutoni
        - - - Sidneyia inexpectans
            - - Tardisia broedeae
              - Cheloniellida
          - - Carimersa neptuni
            - - Kodymirus vagans
              - - Eozetetes gemelli
                - Aglaspidida
