= Etainia =

Etainia may refer to:

- Etainia (moth), a moth genus formerly within Ectoedemia
- Etainia (artiopod), an Ordovician artiopod
