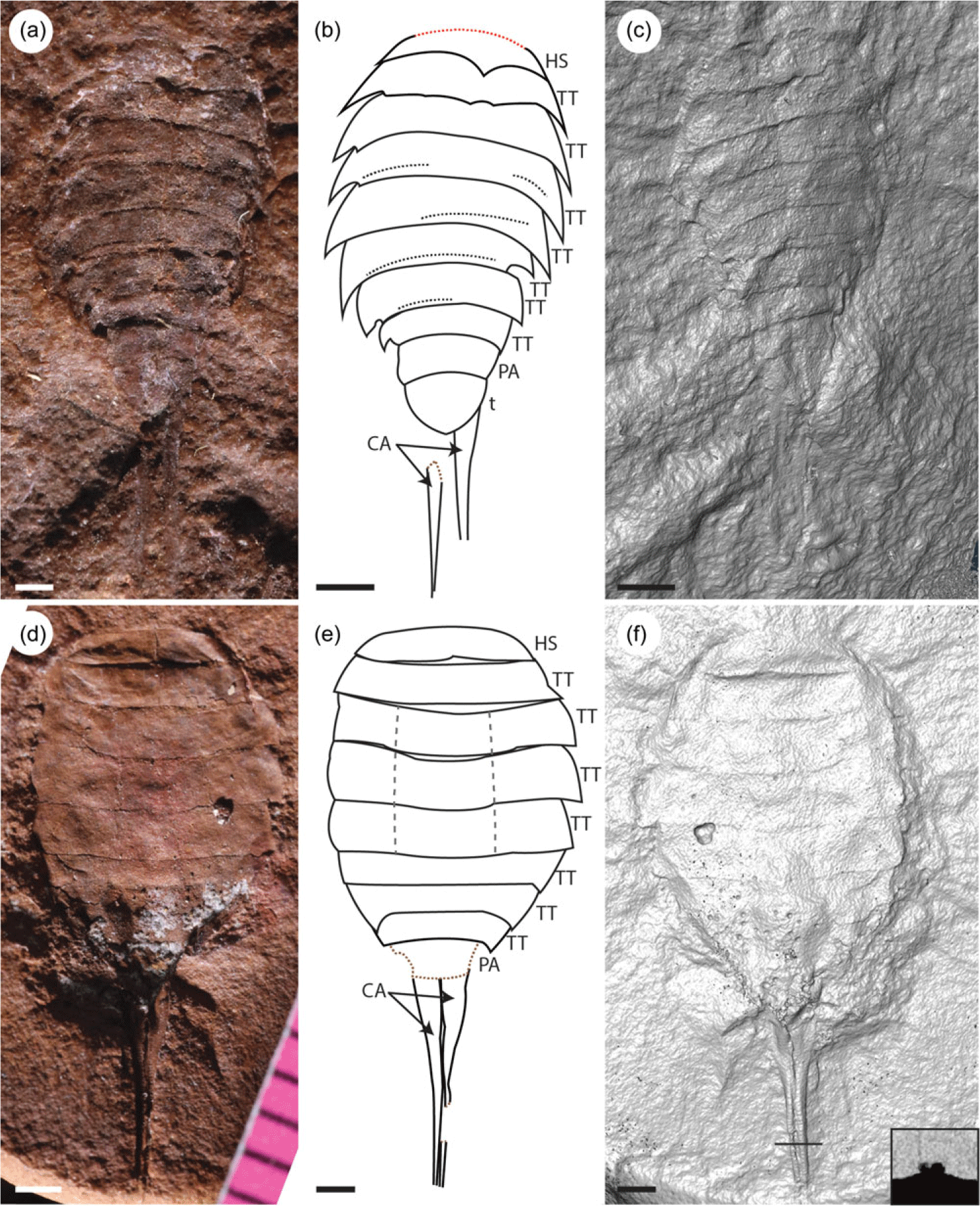
- Fossils of Tardisia

Scientific classification
- Kingdom: Animalia
- Phylum: Arthropoda
- Clade: †Artiopoda
- (unranked): †Vicissicaudata
- Genus: †Tardisia; McCoy et al, 2025
- Species: †T. broedeae

Binomial name
- †Tardisia broedeae McCoy et al, 2025

= Tardisia =

Tardisia Temporal range: Moscovian

Extinct genus of artiopod

Tardisia is an extinct genus of vicissicaudatan arthropod known from the upper Carboniferous Mazon Creek fossil beds in northern Illinois. It is the youngest known member of the Artiopoda outside of the trilobites, at almost 100 million years younger than the next youngest in the Hunsrück Slate and Severnaya Zemlya Formation.

== Etymology ==
Tardisia is named after the TARDIS from the TV show Doctor Who, in reference to the large stratigraphic gap between it and the next youngest vicissicaudatans. The specific name broedeae honours Irene Broede, a Mazon Creek fossil collector.

== Description ==
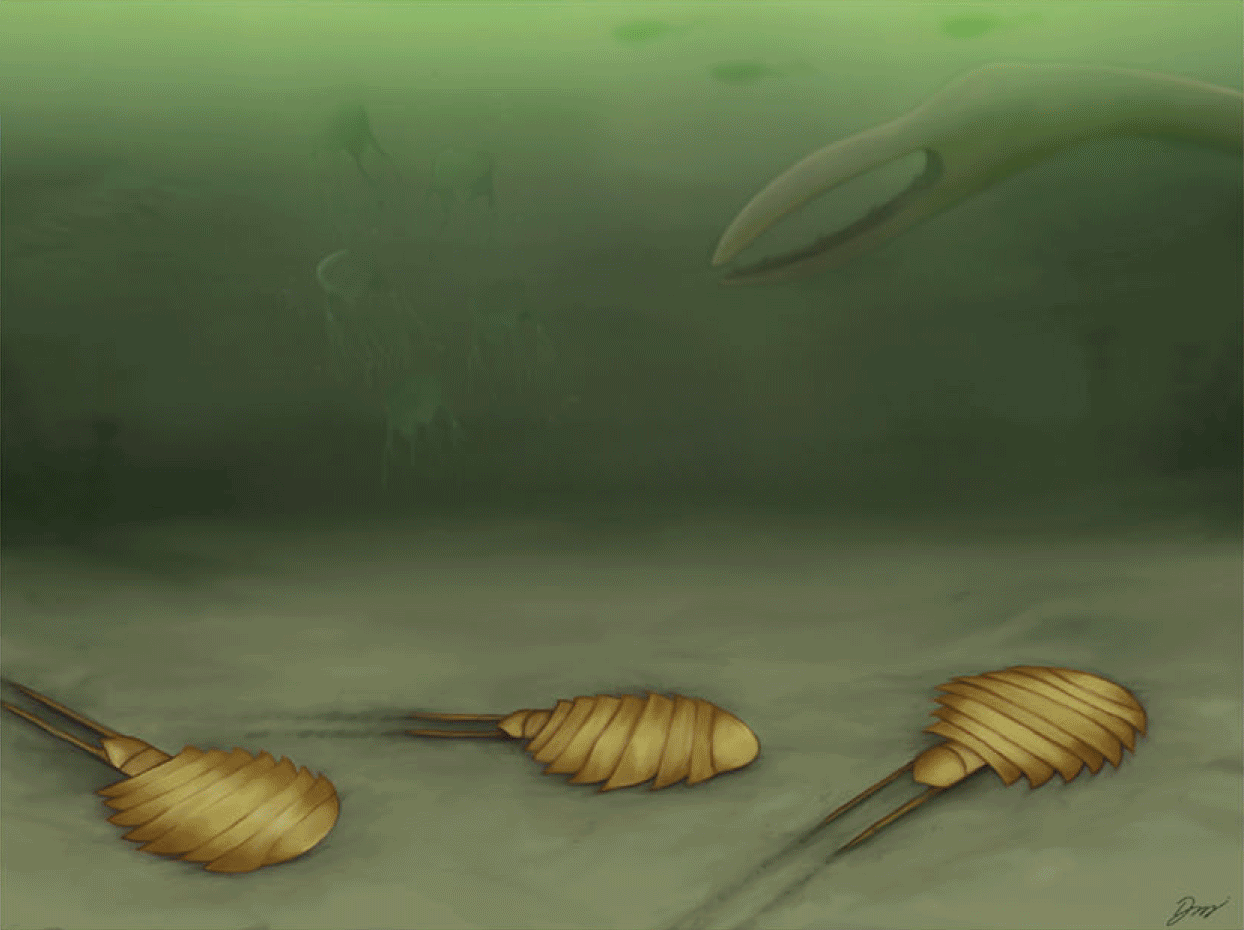
Speculative life restoration

Tardisia lacks eyes, with a head shield (the frontal end is lost on the holotype, but according to descriptions and the paratype it was likely sub-semicircular) smaller than the first tergite. The trunk comprises seven tergites in the thorax, four with overlapping margins, and a postabdomen composed of the eighth segment, which lacks wide pleurae and instead bears a pair of caudal appendages. The trunk's width slightly increases with the widest section (roughly 6 6 mm (0.24 in) wide) being the third tergite, afterwards steadily decreasing towards the posterior. Each segment is around 1 mm (0.039 in) long. The postabdomen bears a shield-shaped telson, slightly wider than long, alongside two caudal appendages at least 6 mm (0.24 in) long and narrowing towards their tips. These appendages have bulbous anterior ends and were likely heavily sclerotized due to them being the only appendages preserved. It is unclear whether they were movable in life.

== Classification ==
Tardisia is likely a vicissicaudatan, due to sharing features such as the number of trunk segments and the postabdomen ending in caudal appendages. While it is unusual in lacking eyes, many cheloniellids also lack eyes, such as Duslia and Neostrabops. Tardisia, while closest resembling cheloniellids, has some key differences from this group. Its postabdomen and telson are much larger, alongside lacking a well-defined axis. In addition, the tergopleurae of cheloniellids have an unusual radial arrangement that Tardisia lacks. Because of this, Tardisia is likely the sister group of cheloniellids.

- Artiopoda
  - Pygmaclypeatus daziensis
  - Retifacies abnormalis
  - Squamacula clypeata
  - Protosutura
  - Trilobitomorpha
  - Vicissicaudata
    - Molaria spinifera
    - - Emeraldella brocki
      - - Emeraldella brutoni
        - - - Sidneyia inexpectans
            - - Tardisia broedeae
              - Cheloniellida
          - - Carimersa neptuni
            - - Kodymirus vagans
              - - Eozetetes gemelli
                - Aglaspidida
