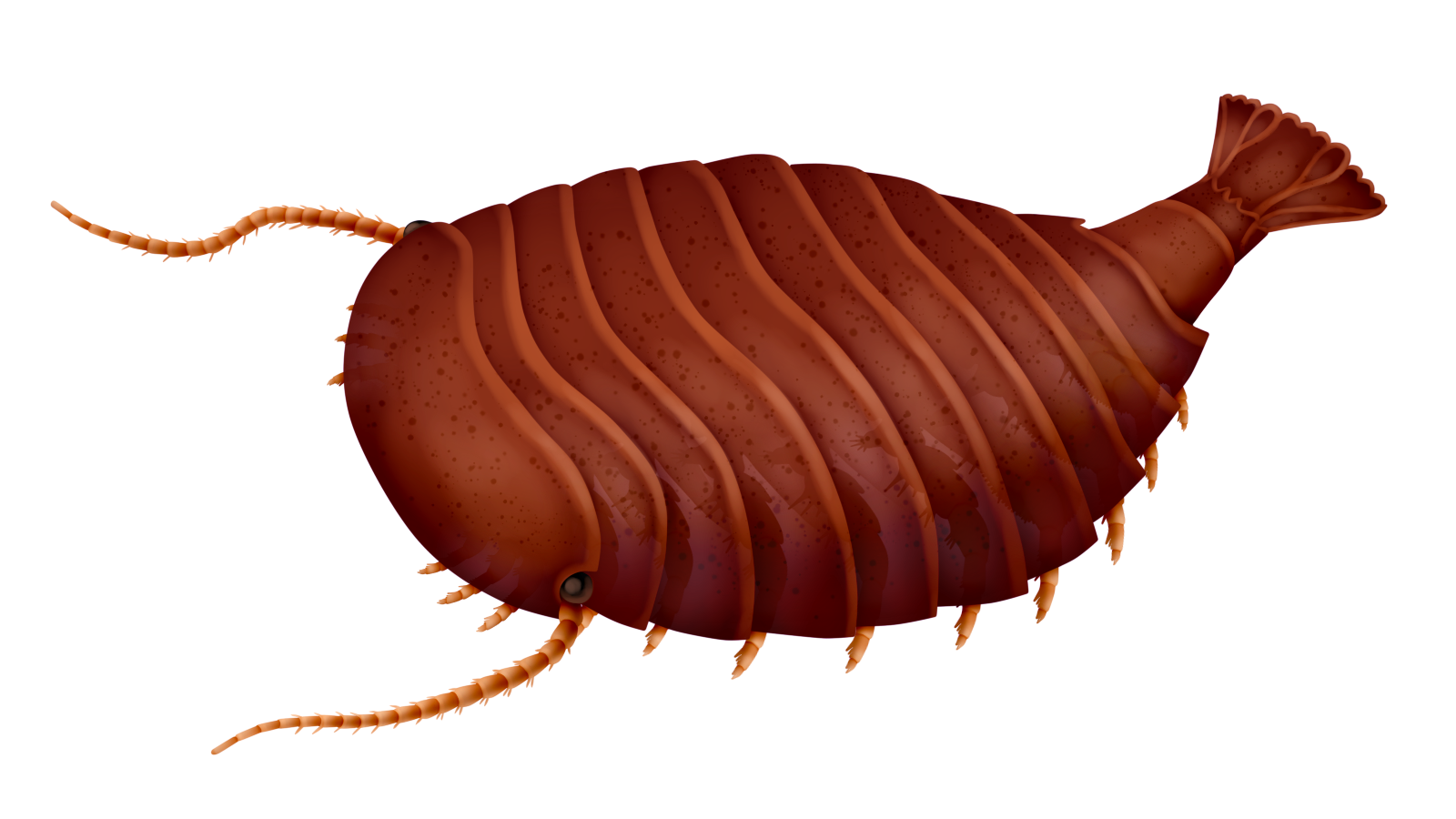
- Reconstruction of Sidneyia inexpectans
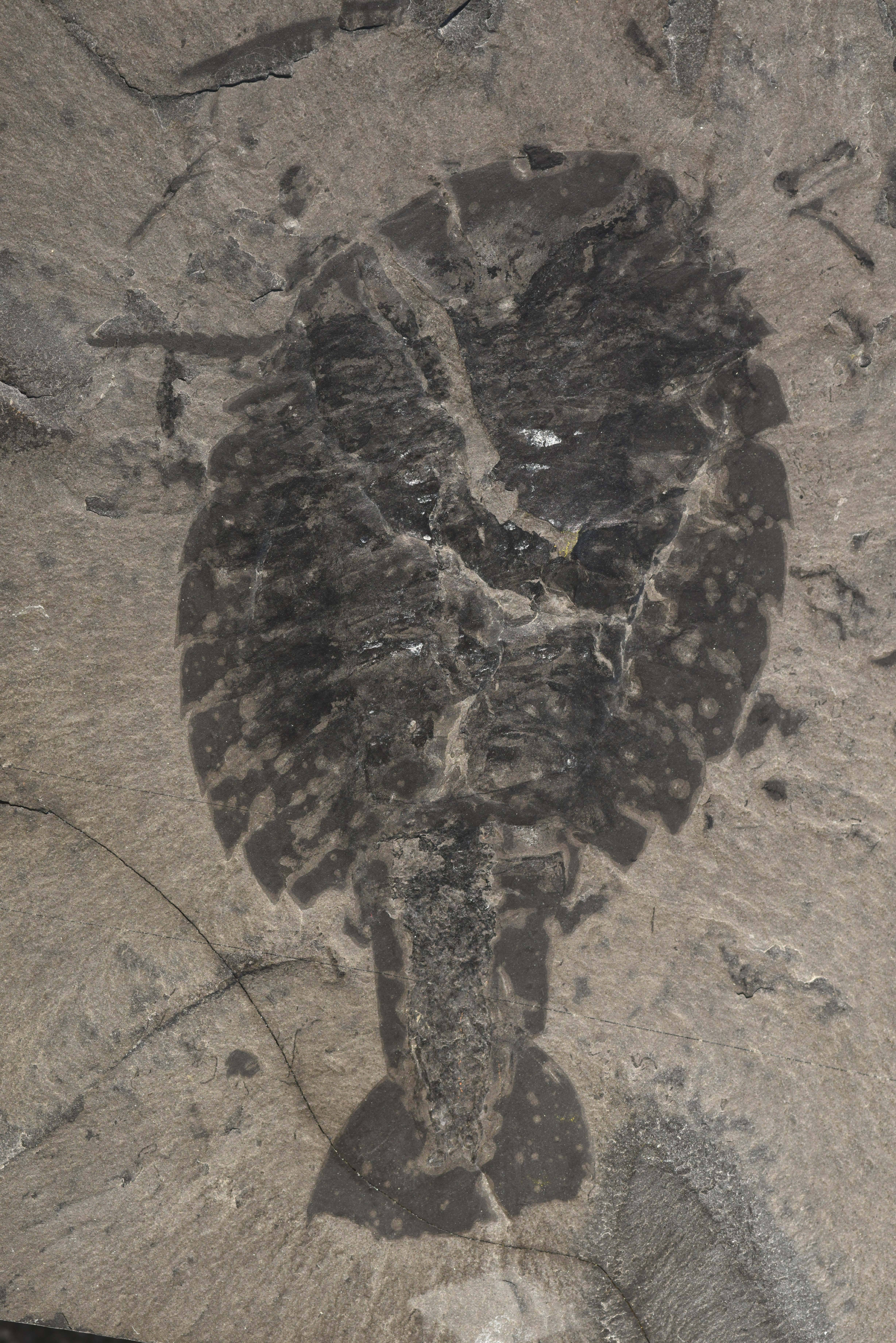
- Fossil of S. inexpectans

Scientific classification
- Kingdom: Animalia
- Phylum: Arthropoda
- Clade: †Artiopoda
- Superclass: †Vicissicaudata
- Genus: †Sidneyia; Walcott, 1911

Type species
- †Sidneyia inexpectans Walcott, 1911

Species
- †S. inexpectans Walcott, 1911; †S. minor Du et al., 2023; †S. malongensis Zhu et al., 2023

= Sidneyia =

Sidneyia Temporal range: Cambrian Stage 3–Wuliuan

Genus of extinct arthropods

Sidneyia is an extinct marine arthropod known from fossils found from the Early to the Mid Cambrian of China and the Mid Cambrian Burgess Shale of British Columbia, Canada. It is thought to have been a durophagous (crushing) predator that used its spine-covered leg bases (gnathobases) to feed on hard-bodied animals like trilobites and brachiopods, as well as possibly soft bodied animals. It was historically placed in the group "Xenopoda" alongside Emeraldella. It is now placed within the clade Vicissicaudata along with aglaspidids, chelonellids, as well as Emeraldella, among others. Vicissicaudata forms part of the broader group Artiopoda, which includes trilobites.

== Description ==
Size comparison of Sidneyia species

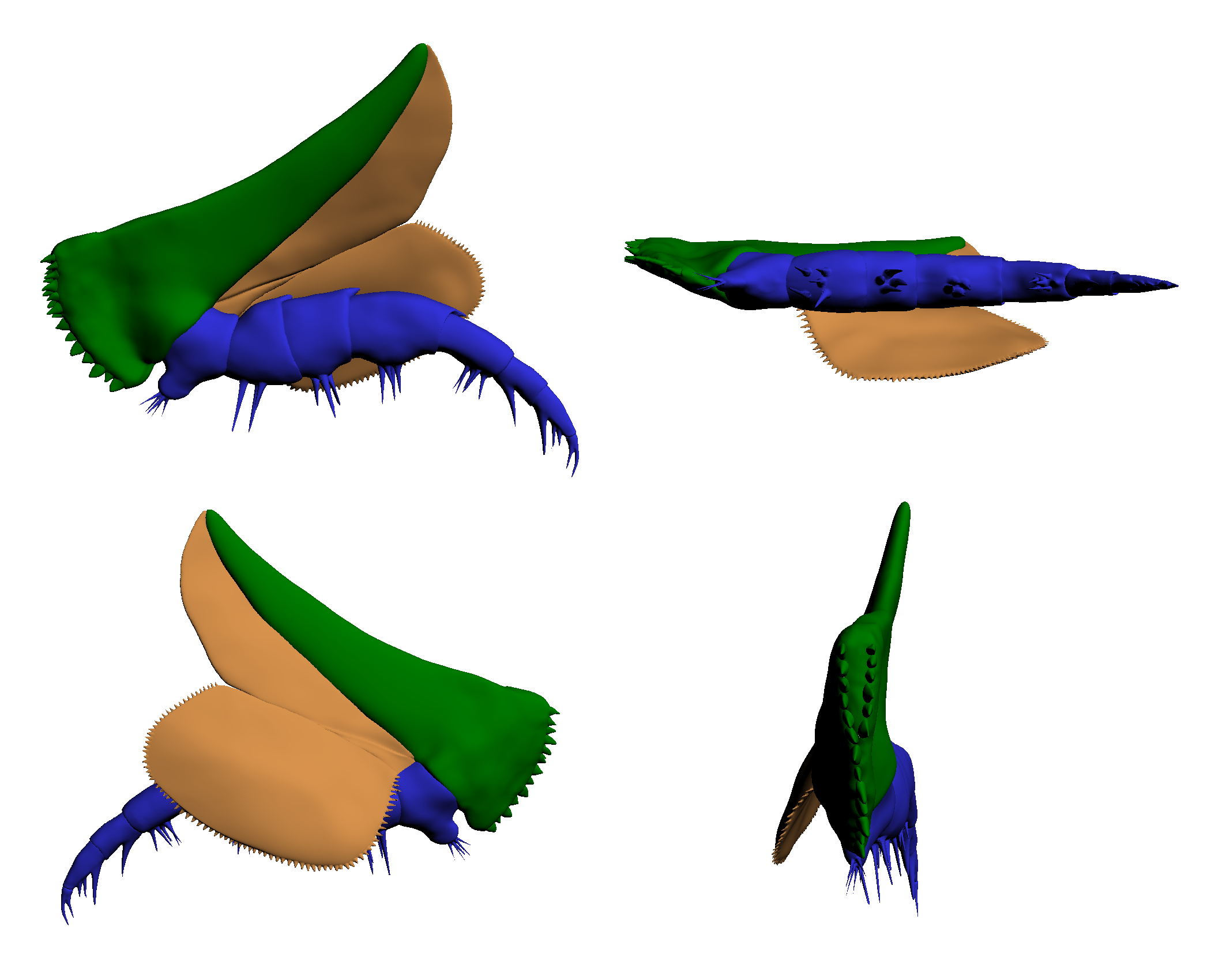
Biramous limb of Sidneyia inexpectans Key: basipod with gnathobasic spines (green) exopod (orange), endopod (blue)

Sidneyia inexpectans reached lengths of at least 16 centimetres (6.3 in). The largest known specimen of S. minor is around 23 mm (0.91 in) long and 14 mm (0.55 in) wide, while the largest specimen of S. malongensis is 31 mm (1.2 in) long and 21 mm (0.83 in) wide. The head shield is short, with notches present on the sides to accommodate stalked eyes, with the underside having a hypostome. The head has a pair of segmented antennae, as well as three pairs of post-antennal appendages. This was followed by a thorax, which had eight to ten segments/tergites, each associated with a pair of biramous (two branched) appendages, this was followed with one to three abdomen segments/tergites, with the body terminating with a telson, which comprised a pair of tail flukes. The appendages bear heavily sclerotised spined basal segments (basipods) called gnathobases, used to process food. In S. minor, the biramous appendages have 8 podomeres/segments on the endopod (the inner leg like branch), with the last segment being a terminal claw. The exopod (the outer branch) of these limbs is flattened and bears lamellae. In S. inexpectans, the endopods of the biramous limbs have seven podomeres, with the first four of these each bearing a number of thin inward projecting spines, while the outer three podomeres bore more stout claw-like spines, with the fourth to ninth pairs of post antennal limbs bearing exopods with blade-like lamellae, which are thought to have been used as gills. S. inexpectans had three pairs of digestive glands within the head shield and front of the thorax, adjacent to the central gut tube.

== Ecology ==
Sidneyia is thought to have been seafloor dwelling (epibenthic) generalist durophagous predator and/or scavenger that used its gnathobases (which closely resemble those of horseshoe crabs) to crush and shred prey items, including hard-shelled organisms like juvenile trilobites (which are abundantly preserved as stomach contents in S. inexpectans) and brachiopods (representing around 6% of the stomach contents of S. inexpectans), but possibly also softer animals like worms or soft bodied arthropods like bradoriids.

== Taxonomy ==
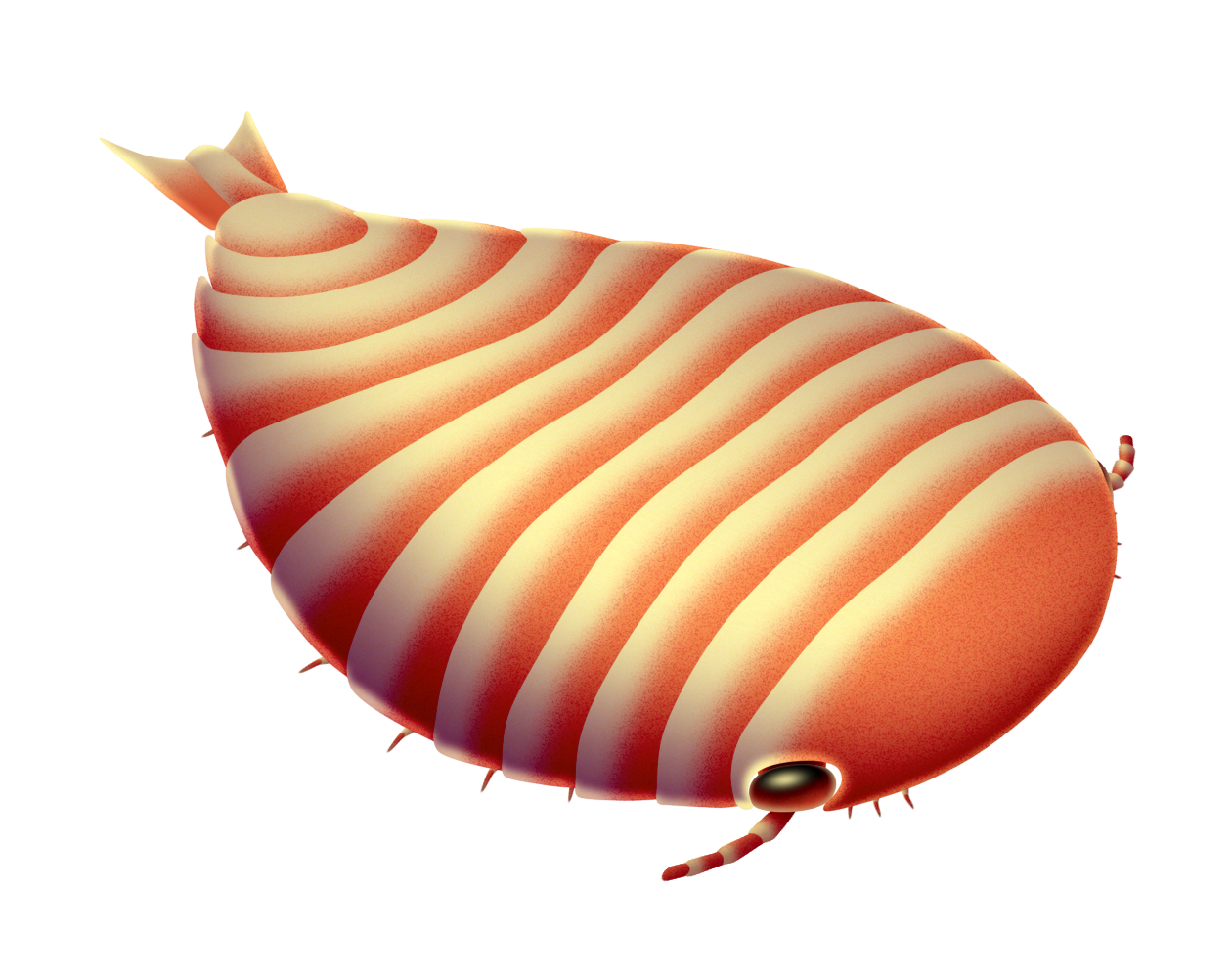
Reconstruction of Sidneyia minor

Sidneyia was discovered in 1910 during the first day of Charles Walcott's exploration of the Burgess Shale. He named it after his elder son, Sidney, who had helped to locate the site and collect the specimen. The species name, Sidneyia inexpectans, is derived from the meaning of "Sidney's surprise".

144 specimens of Sidneyia are known from the Greater Phyllopod bed, where they comprise 0.27% of the community.

Sidneyia sinica was named in 2002 from a specimen found in the Chengjiang Biota of South China. However, it has since been rejected from the genus, and other indeterminate specimens assigned to the genus from the Spence Shale and Sirius Passet lack key diagnostic characters. Specimens that can confidently assigned to the genus include Sidneyia cf. inexpectans, known from the Wuliuan Mantou Formation of North China, Sidneyia minor from the Early Cambrian (Cambrian Stage 3) Xiaoshiba Biota of Yunnan, China, and a valid species of Sidneyia from Chengjiang, Sidneyia malongensis.

In 1923, Sidneyia, was placed, along with Emeraldella, as part of the group "Xenopoda". Today, both Sidneyia and Emeraldella are placed as part of the clade Vicissicaudata within Artiopoda, which includes trilobites and other arthropods with similar bodyforms. However, Sidneyia and Emeraldella are usually not recovered as each others closest relatives within Vicissicaudata, rendering "Xenopoda" invalid.

Cladogram of Artiopoda including Sidneyia after Berks et al. 2023.

- Artiopoda
  - - Thulaspis
    - Squamacula
  - - Protosutura
      - Zhiwenia
      - Australimicola
      - Acanthomeridion
    - - Vicissicaudata
        - Sidneyia
        - - Cheloniellida
          - - Emeraldella
            - - Kodymirus
              - - Eozetetes
                - Aglaspidida
      - Trilobitomorpha
        - - Retifacies
          - Pygmaclypeatus
        - - Xandarellida
          - - Nektaspida
            - - Conciliterga
              - - Kwanyinaspis
                - - Phytophilaspis
                  - Trilobita

Cladogram of Vicissicaudata after McCoy et al. 2025:

- - Vicissicaudata
    - Molaria spinifera
    - - Emeraldella brocki
      - - Emeraldella brutoni
        - - - Sidneyia inexpectans
            - - Tardisia broedeae
              - Cheloniellida
          - - Carimersa neptuni
            - - Kodymirus vagans
              - - Eozetetes gemelli
                - Aglaspidida

== See also ==
- Paleobiota of the Burgess Shale
- Paleobiota of the Maotianshan Shales
