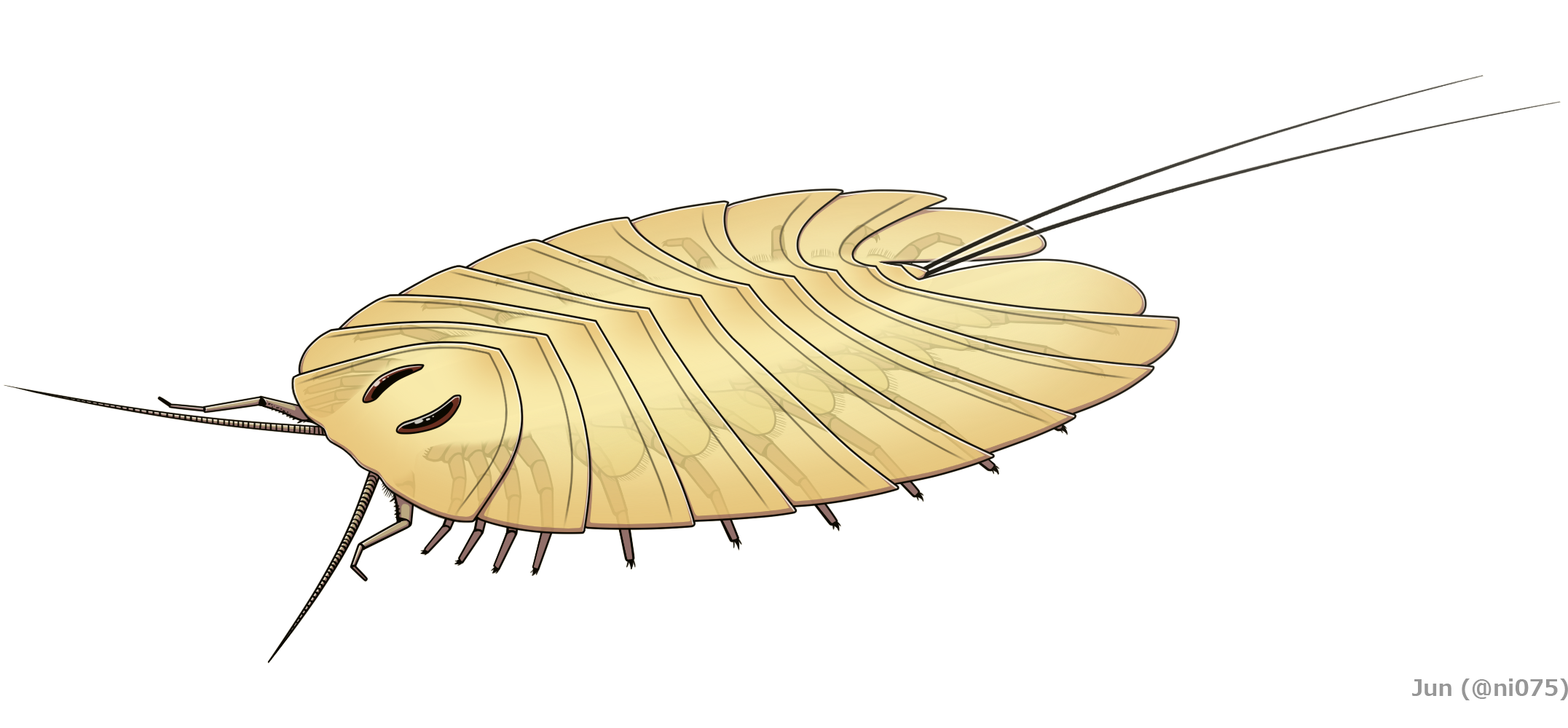
- Reconstruction of Cheloniellon calmani

Scientific classification
- Kingdom: Animalia
- Phylum: Arthropoda
- Clade: †Artiopoda
- Order: †Cheloniellida
- Genus: †Cheloniellon; Broili, 1932
- Species: †C. calmani

Binomial name
- †Cheloniellon calmani Broili, 1932

= Cheloniellon =

Cheloniellon Temporal range: Lower Devonian

Extinct genus of arthropods

Cheloniellon is a monotypic genus of cheloniellid arthropod, known only by one species, Cheloniellon calmani, discovered from the Lower Devonian Hunsrück Slate of Germany.

== Morphology ==
Cheloniellon range about 20 centimeters in body length (excluding appendages). The flattened, ovoid body compose of 11 tergites (dorsal exoskeleton), all but the posteriormost are laterally expanded and covered the appendages underneath each of them. The boundaries between tergites have a radiated appearance. Dorsal surface of the first tergite have a pair of kidney-shaped eyes. Based on the differentiation of corresponding appendages, the first 2 tergites and the remaining 9 tergites were interpreted as those of cephalon (head) and trunk, respectively. Contray to the widely-referred reconstruction by Stürmer & Bergström (1978), but as most of the Cheloniellids, There is no evidence of telson (a medial tail-like terminal structure) in any described fossil materials.

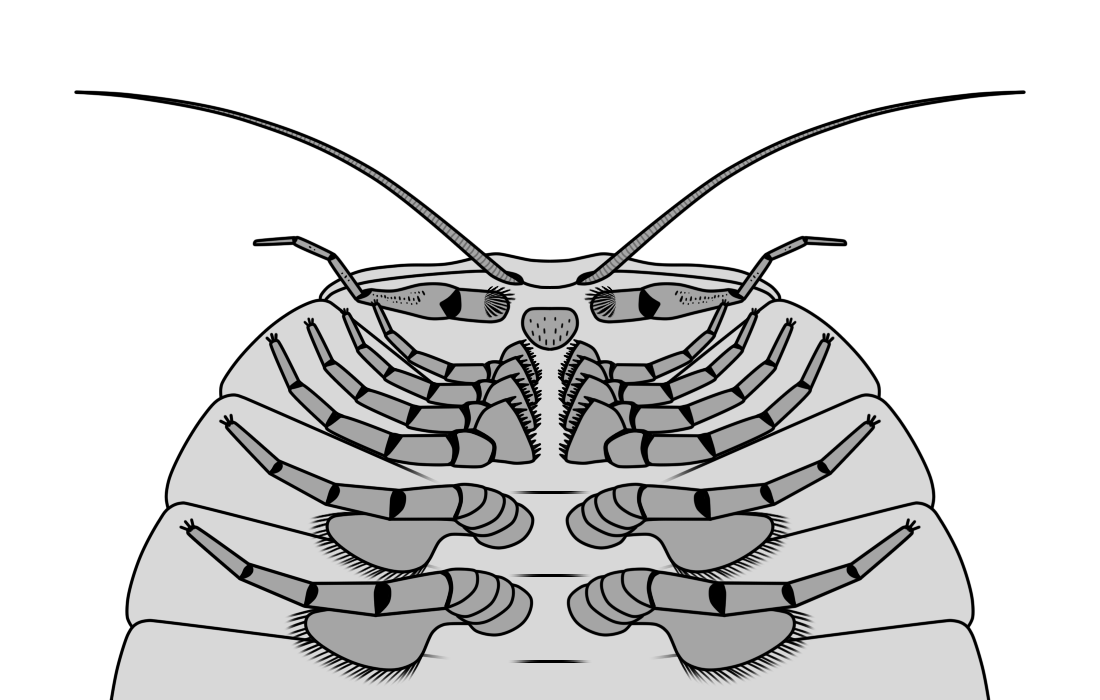
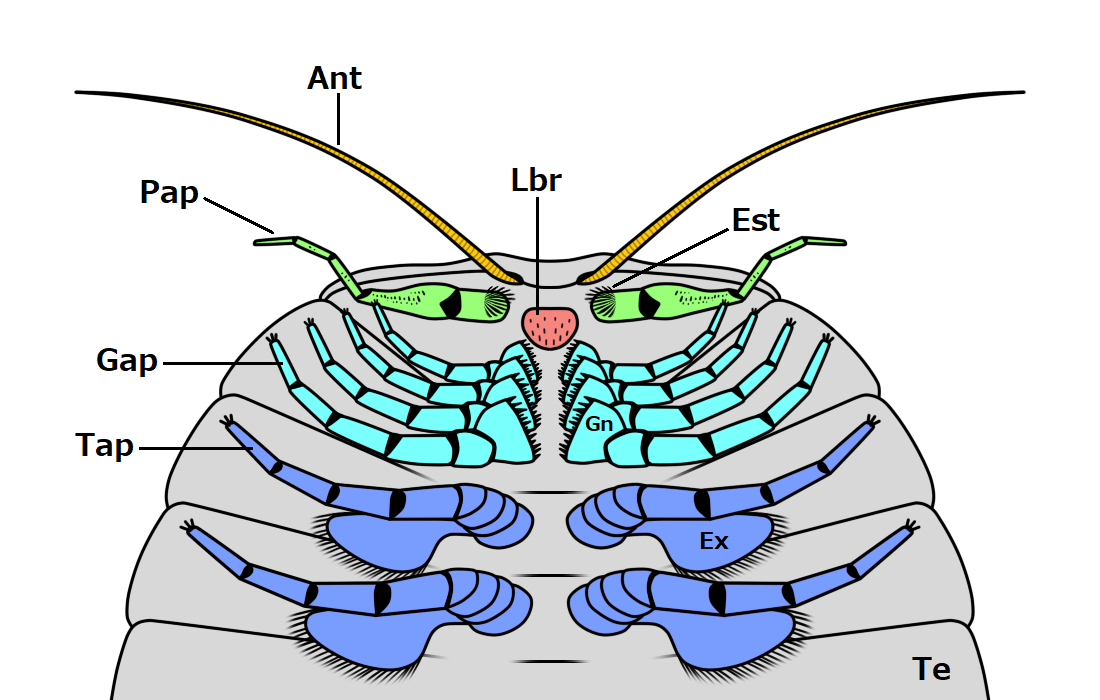
Ventral structures of the anterior region of Cheloniellon calmani, showing all cephalic appendages and first two trunk appendage pairs. Dark grey (first diagram) and coloured region (second diagram): appendicular structures, Ant (yellow): antenna, Pap (green): 2nd cephalic appendage, Est: esthetasc-like brush, Lbr (red): labrum, Gap (cyan): gnathobasic appendage, Gn: gnathobase, Tap (blue): trunk appendage, Ex: exopod, Te: tergite.

Underneath the tergites were numerous pairs of appendages. The anteriormost appendage pair were antennae, followed by a pair of specialized second appendages that bore spines and esthetasc-like brushes, and 4 pairs of leg-like appendages that have overlapped gnathobases (jaw-like structure on leg base). The mouth was covered by a labrum with spiny surface, situated between the second appendages and the first gnathobasic appendages. The last gnathobasic appendage pair and the remaining 5 appendage pairs anterior to it were interpreted as corresponding to the second tergite and first tergite, respectively. Appendages posterior to the cephalon were 8 pairs of biramous appendages (each compose of a leg-like endopod and a lobe-like exopod) and a pair of furcae, corresponding to the remaining 9 trunk tergites.

== Paleoecology ==
Cheloniellon may have been a benthic predator, using its gnathobases to crush prey while the spiny labrum may have helped lead food items toward the mouth opening. The specialized second appendages are too fragile to be raptorial, instead they may have played a tactile role, sensing the property and position of food items. The endopod and exopod of the trunk appendages may have had a locomotory and respiratory function, respectively.

== Classification ==
- Cheloniellida
  - Neostrabops
  - - Cheloniellon
    - - Triopus
      - Duslia

Phylogenetic position of Cheloniellon.

Cheloniellon is a genus of Cheloniellida, an extinct arthropod taxon that have a controversial phylogenetic position. It was previously thought to be chelicerate-related, but later studies repeatedly suggests it as a member of Artiopoda, forming the clade Vicissicaudata with Aglaspidida and related genera. Within Cheloniellida, Cheloniellon branched next to Neostrabops but basal to Triopus and Duslia.
