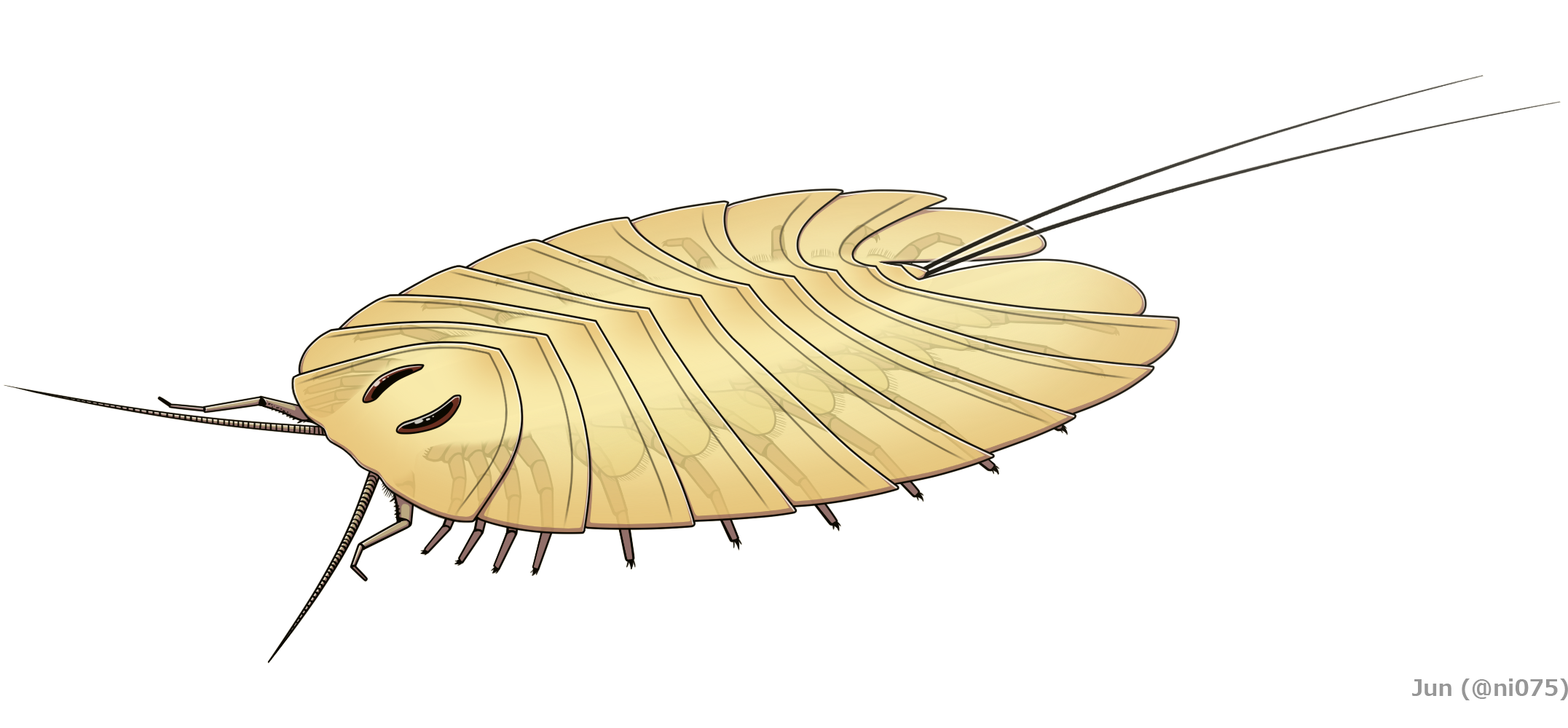

Scientific classification
- Kingdom: Animalia
- Phylum: Arthropoda
- Clade: †Artiopoda
- (unranked): †Vicissicaudata
- (unranked): †Cheloniellida; Broili, 1932

Genera
- Cheloniellon Broili, 1932; Duslia Jahn, 1893; Eoduslia Van Roy, 2006; Neostrabops Caster & Macke, 1952; Paraduslia Dunlop, 2002; Pseudarthron Selden & White, 1984; Triopus Barrande, 1872

= Cheloniellida =

Cheloniellida Temporal range: Upper Ordovician–Early Devonian

Order of arthropods (fossil)

Cheloniellida is a taxon (usually referred to as an order) of extinct Paleozoic arthropods. As of 2018, 7 monotypic genera of cheloniellids had been formally described, whose fossils are found in marine strata ranging from Ordovician to Devonian in age. Cheloniellida has a controversial phylogenetic position, with previous studies associated it as either a member or relative of various fossil and extant arthropod taxa. It was later accepted as a member of Vicissicaudata within Artiopoda.

== Morphology ==
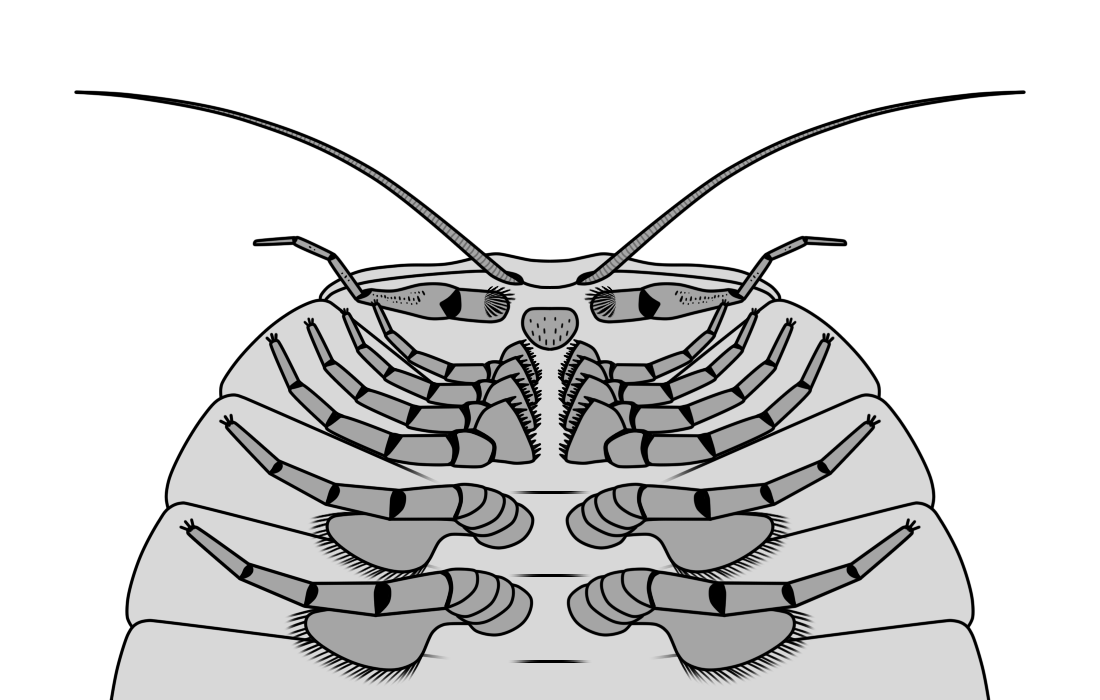
Ventral structures of the anterior region of Cheloniellon calmani, showing differentiation between appendages.

The flattened, ovoid body of cheloniellid comprises an eye-bearing cephalon (head) and segmented trunk region, dorsally divided by a series of tergites (dorsal exoskeleton). The cephalon could be divided into procephalon and gnathocephalon. Compared to other members of Artiopoda, the head shield (dorsal exoskeleton of cephalon) of cheloniellid is relatively reduced. The trunk is wider than the cephalon and is made up of 8-13 tergites. The pleural (lateral) tips of first few tergites are directed anterolaterally, becoming increasingly posterolaterally directed rearward, giving the segmental boundaries between tergites a radiated appearance. The last trunk segment, also known as postabdomen, is tiny and laterally encompassed by the pleural regions of previous tergite.

Based on available materials, the cephalon comprises a pair of antennae and 5 pairs of uniramus appendages, with the posterior 4 pairs bore gnathobases. There are evidences that the non-gnathobasic second cephalic appendages are specialized or even raptorial in some species. Each of the trunk segments (except the last one) has a pair of biramous appendages each consisting of a leg-like endopod and a shorter exopod. The last trunk segment has a pair of spine/whip-like appendages referred as furcae or cerci, some species bore a medial spine between it which may or may not be a telson.

== Classification ==
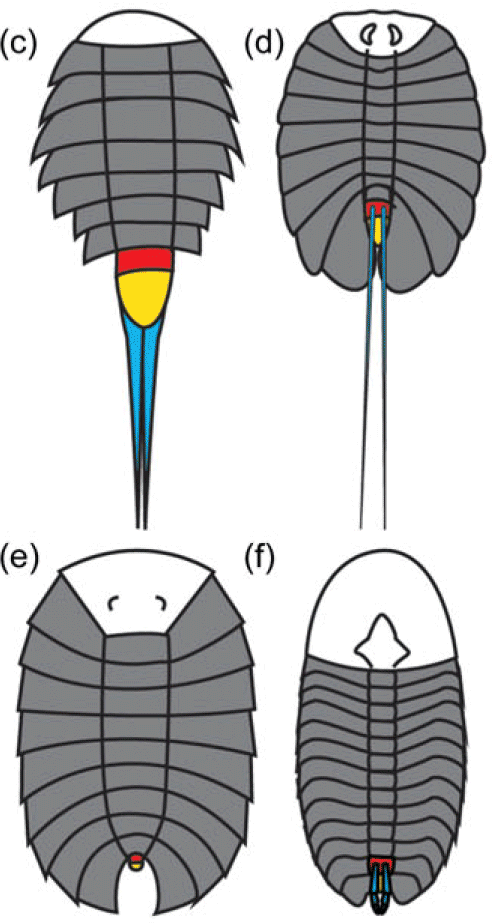
Diagram of various cheloniellids and related taxa; (C) Tardisia broedeae, (D) Cheloniellon calmani, (E) Triopus draboviensis, (F) Paraduslia talimaae.

=== Phylogenetic position ===
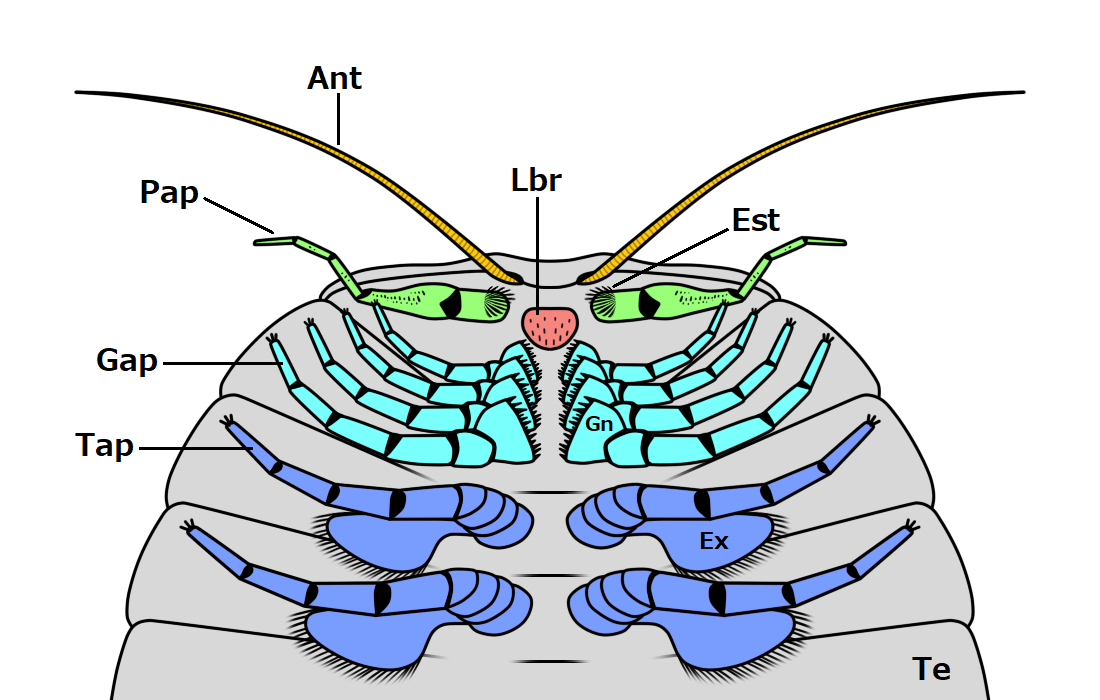
The specialized second appendages (Pap, green) and gnathobasic appendages (Gap, cyan) of Cheloniellon had been compared to chelicerate prosomal appendages by some studies.

While Boudreaux (1979) regarded Cheloniellida as a class, further studies usually treat Cheloniellida as an order. Cheloniellida has a controversial phylogenetic position within arthropod higher classifications, with studies mainly around 20th century suggested it as a relative/member of either Crustacea, Trilobita, Chelicerata or Aglaspidida. Some species even had been misidentified as polyplacophoran mollusks (chiton) when being first described. Originally, the iconic cheloniellid Cheloniellon was believed to be a crustacean similar to trilobites. Subsequent authors suggests that it occupied a position intermediate between trilobitomorphs and chelicerates, while some also interpreted it as a sister group of crustaceans or chelicerates as well. The suggested close relationship between cheloniellids and chelicerates was inferred by the gnathobasic appendages similar to those of merostomes (e.g. Xiphosurans and Eurypterids), and the hypothesis that the chelicerates arose from trilobitomorphs through the loss of deutocerebral antennae (i.e. first antennae) and specialization of tritocerebral appendages into chelicerae (comparable to the cheloniellid antennae and specialized 2nd appendages), a scenario which is not supported by gene expression, neuroanatomical and developmental evidences (suggests that chelicerae are in fact deutocerebral).

- Artiopoda
  - Squamacula
  - - Retifacies
    - Kwanyinaspis
    - Conciliterga
    - - Petalopleura
      - - Nektaspidida
        - - Phytophylaspis
          - Trilobita
    - Vicissicaudata
      - Sidneyia
      - - Cheloniellida
          - Neostrabops
          - - Cheloniellon
            - - Triopus
              - Duslia
        - - Emeraldella
          - - Kodymirus
            - - Eozetetes
              - Aglaspidida

Summarized phylogeny of Artiopoda with focus on Cheloniellida, based on Lerosey-Aubril et al. (2017).

As of 21st century, Cheloniellida was mostly found to form a clade with Aglaspidida and Xenopoda (e.g. Sidneyia and Emeraldella). The clade was formally named Vicissicaudata in 2013, united by a differentiated terminal trunk area (postabdomen) that bears a pair of non-leg-like appendages. Numerous phylogenetic analyses also retrieved Vicissicaudata within Artiopoda, a diverse arthropod taxon comprising trilobites and similar fossil taxa that may or may not be closely related to chelicerates.

=== Included genera and species ===
The unambiguous members of Cheloniellida are shown as follows:

- Cheloniellon Broili, 1932
  - Cheloniellon calmani Broili, 1932—Lower Devonian, Germany
- Duslia Jahn, 1893
  - Duslia insignis Jahn, 1893—Upper Ordovician, Czech Republic, Morocco
- Eoduslia Van Roy, 2006 (unpublished?)
  - Eoduslia brahimtahiri Van Roy, 2006—Upper Ordovician, Morocco (unpublished?)
- Neostrabops Caster & Macke, 1952
  - Neostrabops martini Caster & Macke, 1952—Upper Ordovician, United States
- Paraduslia Dunlop, 2002
  - Paraduslia talimaae Dunlop, 2002—Lower Devonian, Russia
- Pseudarthron Selden & White, 1984
  - Pseudarthron whittingtoni Selden & White, 1984—Upper Silurian
- Triopus Barrande, 1872
  - Triopus drabowiensis Barrande, 1872—Upper Ordovician, Czech Republic, Morocco

In 2018, a new species (informally named "Latromirus" in an unpublished thesis from 2016) was described in a preprint by Wendruff et al. According to Braddy & Dunlop 2021, the enigmatic Parioscorpio may have cheloniellid affinities, however that interpretation is denied by Van Roy et al. 2022, only remaining specimen UWGM 2439 (holotype specimen of "Latromirus") as possible cheloniellid.
