= Llanfallteg Formation =

- Stratigraphic range: Darriwilian
- Type: Formation

Lithology
- Primary: Siltstone, Tuff

Location
- Region: England, Wales
- Country: United Kingdom

The Llanfallteg Formation is a geologic formation in Wales. It preserves fossils dating back to the Ordovician period. It predominantly consists of ash containing siltstones, as wells as ash fall deposits and tuffs. It likely dates to the Darriwilian based on graptolites. The local graptolite fauna includes Didymograptus artus and Glossograptus armatus. The local trilobite fauna includes agnostids, phacopids and asaphids.

== See also ==
- List of fossiliferous stratigraphic units in England
