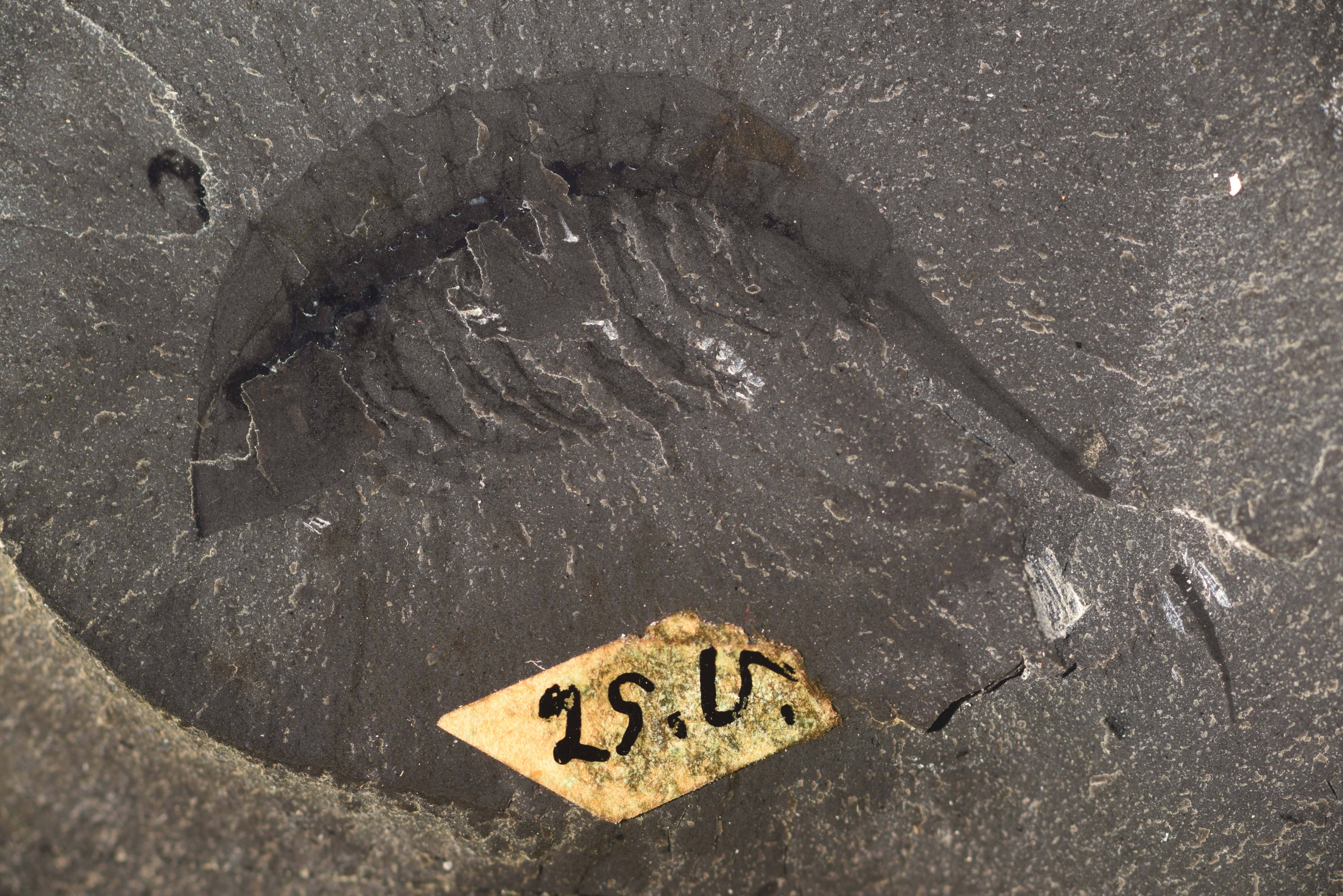
- M. spinifera lectotype
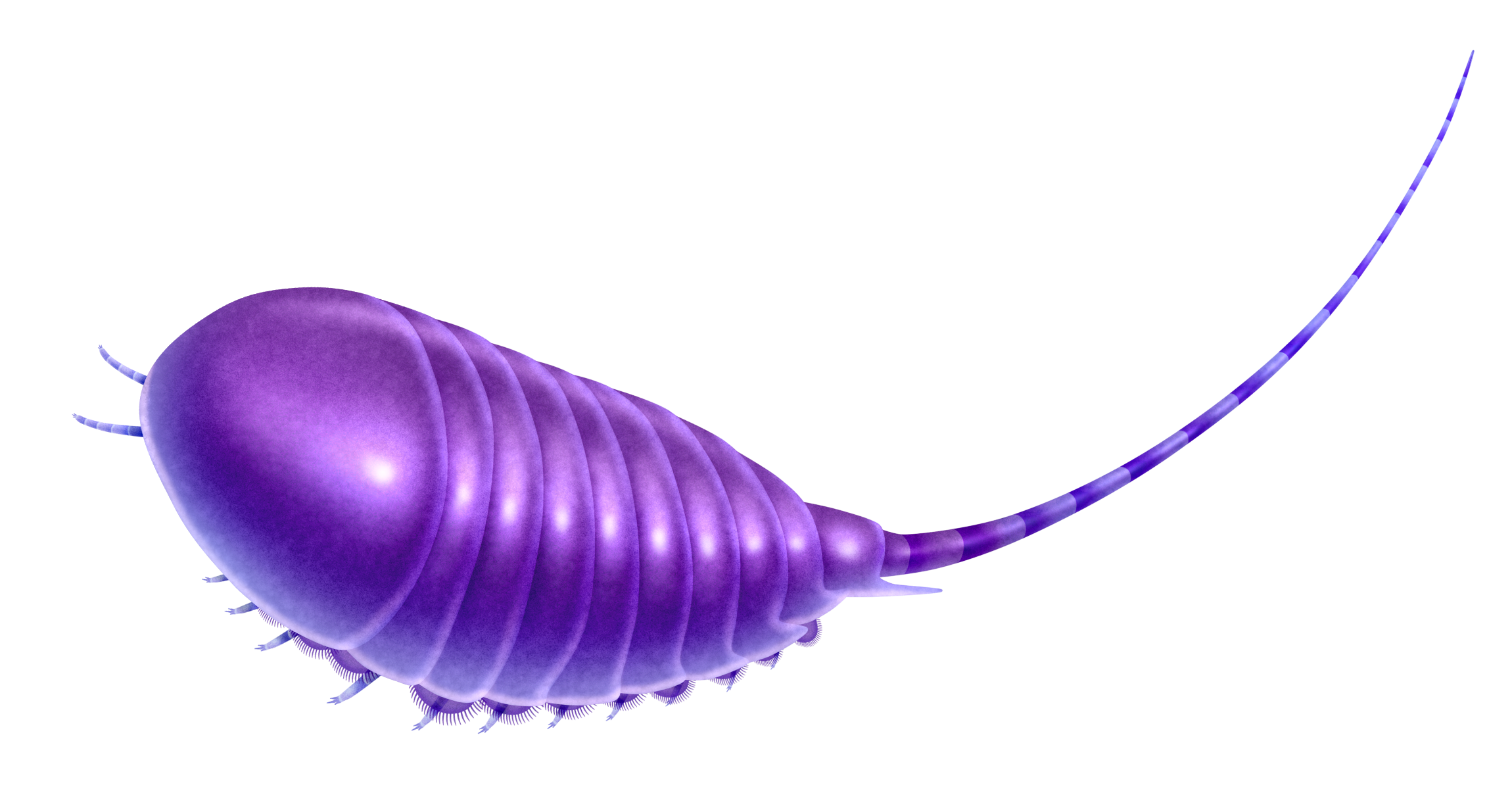
- Life restoration of M. spinifera

Scientific classification
- Kingdom: Animalia
- Phylum: Arthropoda
- Clade: †Artiopoda
- Genus: †Molaria; Walcott, 1912

Type species
- Molaria spinifera Walcott, 1912

Other species
- Molaria steini Peel, 2017

= Molaria =

Molaria Temporal range: Cambrian Series 2–Burgess Shale

Extinct genus of arthropods

Molaria is a genus of Cambrian arthropod, the type species M. spinifera is known from the Middle Cambrian Burgess Shale. 144 specimens of Molaria are known from the Greater Phyllopod bed, where they comprise 0.27% of the community. A second species M. steini was described from the Sirius Passet in Greenland in 2017.

== Etymology ==
The genus name derives from “Molar”, the name of a mountain peak east of the Valley of the Ten Peaks in Alberta, Canada, which in turn was so named by James Hector in 1859 because the shape of the mountain resembles a molar tooth. The specific name of the type species, spinifera, comes from Latin spinifer “spine-bearing.”

== Description ==
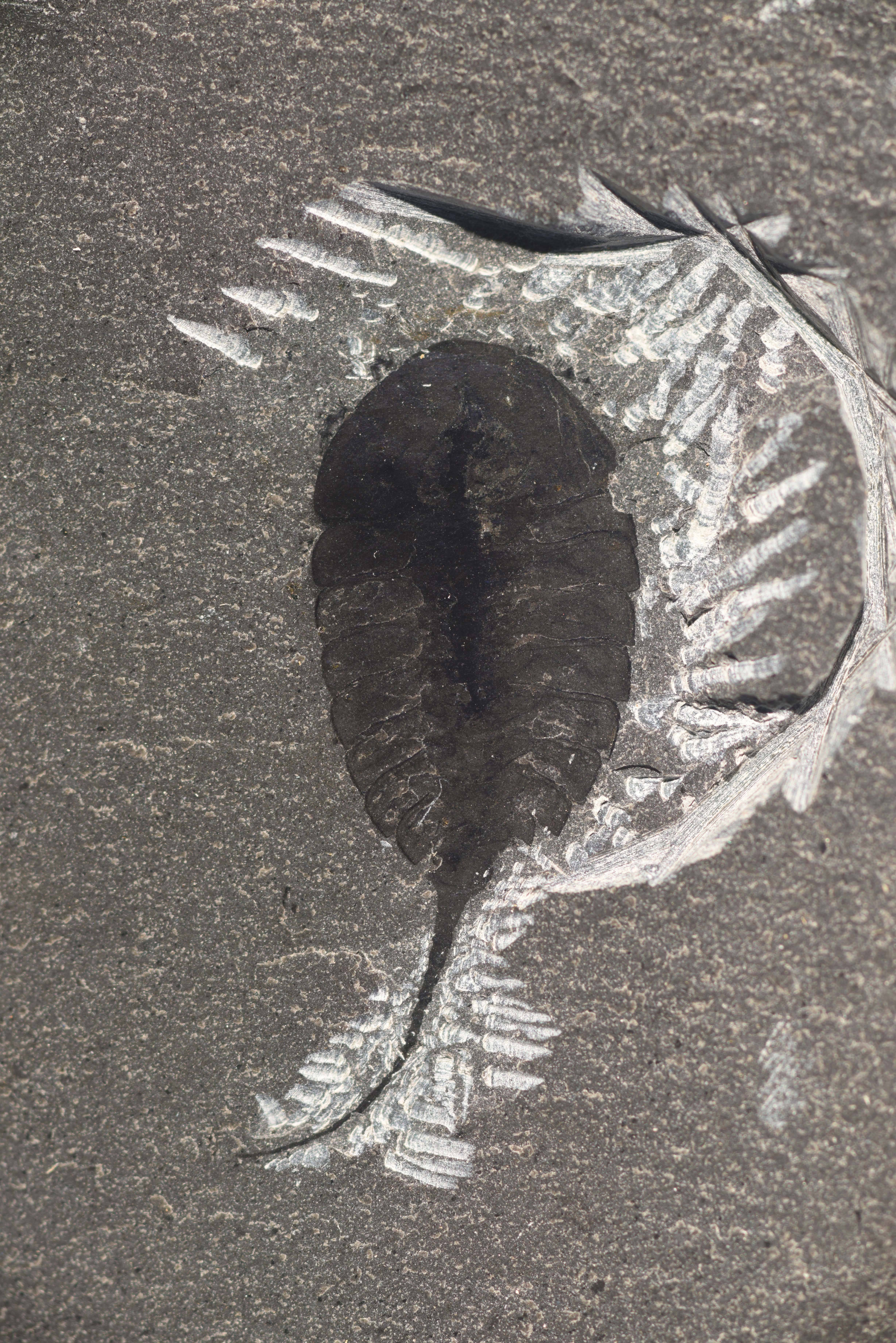
Specimen of M. spinifera showing the long telson

Size comparison of the two species

The body of Molaria consisted of a head shield (cephalon), a trunk consisting of eight sections (tergites), and a telson, which included a short ventral spine and a long posterior spine. Three pairs of legs were beneath the cephalon and another eight pairs were attached to the trunk. Eyes were lacking, but a pair of short antennae was present on the cephalon. Specimens of Molaria ranged from 8 to 26 mm in length from cephalon to telson, with the posterior spine slightly longer than the body length.

== Affinity ==
Molaria was superficially similar to Habelia, another Burgess Shale arthropod with a long tail spine, but which possessed 12 trunk tergites. It is currently considered a member of Artiopoda.
