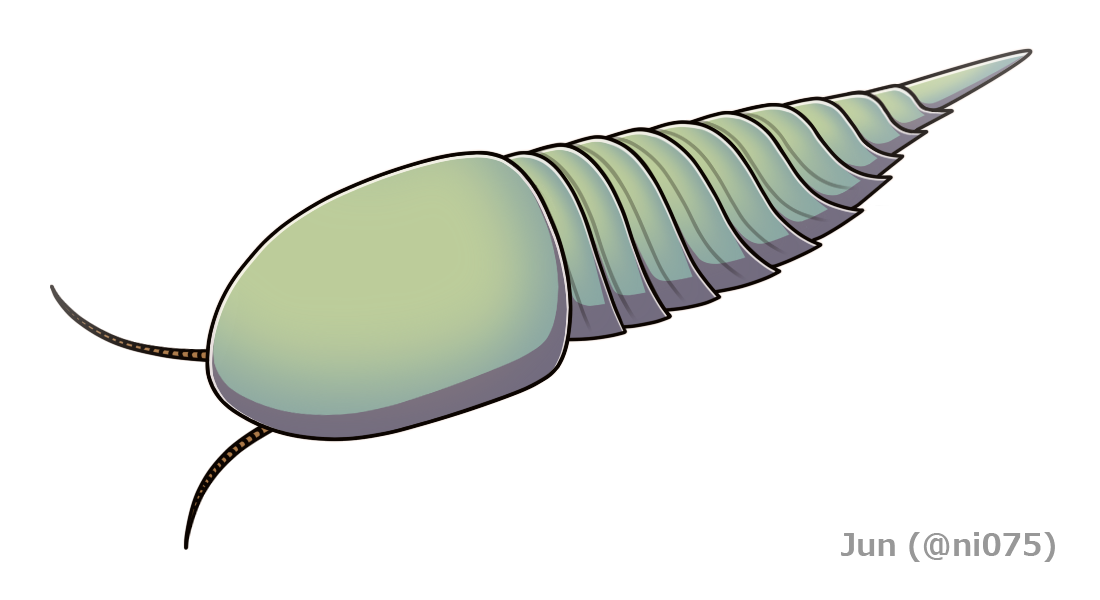
- Artistic reconstruction of Tremaglaspis unite.

Scientific classification
- Kingdom: Animalia
- Phylum: Arthropoda
- Clade: †Artiopoda
- Order: †Aglaspidida
- Family: †Tremaglaspididae
- Genus: †Tremaglaspis; Fortey and Rushton, 2003

Type species
- †T. unite Fortey and Rushton, 2003

Other species
- †T. vanroyi Lerosey-Aubril et al., 2013

= Tremaglaspis =

Tremaglaspis Temporal range: Guzhangian–Floian

Extinct genus of aglaspidid arthropods from the Cambrian and Ordovician periods

Tremaglaspis is an extinct genus of aglaspidid arthropods. Fossils belonging to this genus were discovered in Utah, Wales and Morocco in rocks ranging from the Guzhangian stage of the Cambrian to the Floian stage of the Ordovician in age. The genus belongs to the family Tremaglaspididae and currently contains two species: T. unite and T. vanroyi.

== Discovery, naming and species ==
The type species, T. unite, was named in 2003 by Fortey and Rushton on the basis of two complete carapaces and an isolated prosoma found in Y Garth near Porthmadog, in the upper Tremadocian Dol-cyn-afon Formation.

The genus name is a combination of Tremadog (also written Tremadoc) and Aglaspis. The species name honors T. Unite, who discovered the fossils.

Five other specimens were discovered and described by Fortey et al., 2009 from the same site. They allowed a more accurate description and interpretation of the species.

A second species, T. vanroyi was named by Lerosey-Aubril et al. in 2013. It was found in the Guzhangian Weeks Formation in Utah. Two specimens are known: the holotype is a complete and well preserved specimen flattened in lateral view. The paratype is a mould of the dorsal exoskeleton of a complete and dorso-ventrally flattened individual.

This species name honors Peter Van Roy, who significantly contributed to the research on Aglaspidida.

Material attributed to Tremaglaspis sp. is also known from the Floian upper Fezouata Formation in Morocco.

== Description ==
The specimens are more or less distorted, which makes the morphological analysis harder.

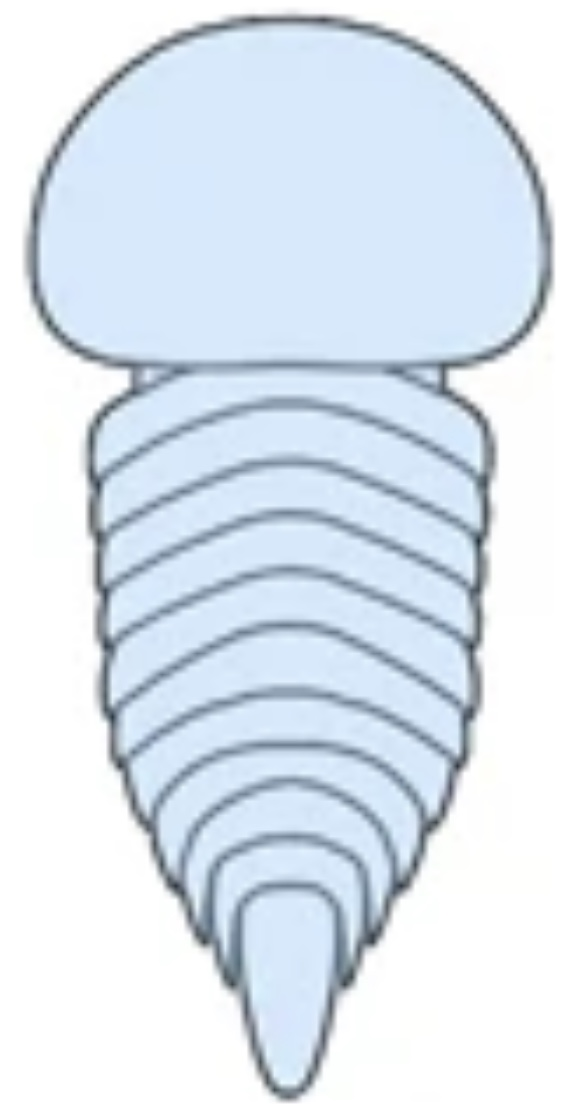
Diagrammatic reconstruction of T. vanroyi.

T. unite is pretty large, the holotype is 130 mm long. The prosoma was not very well preserved in any of the original three specimens, however, thanks to the better preservation of one of the later specimens, a more accurate description of the prosoma is possible. Originally, the prosoma was seen as an inverted U-shape with a rounded point at the front center. However, in the 2009 redescription, the anterior margin is more gently curved. The overall shape of the prosoma seems to have been more rectangular. There is no dorsal feature, and so no dorsal eye nor genal spine. The convexity of T. unite was greater than formerly thought.

The opisthosoma widens toward the fourth segment, then it tapers more rapidly after the sixth segment. The holotype doesn't preserve the posterior part well, eleven segments were formerly counted while there are actually ten. The spinosity of the posterior segments is more important than originally thought.

The telson is long (nearly three times as long as wide), triangular and sharply pointed. The upper surface is carinate.

Almost every T. unite specimen preserves an ellipse shape on the dorsal prosoma. Even though it may be a collapsed structure after the death of the animals, it is more likely to be the impression of a large hypostome.

The holotype of T. vanroyi is 86 mm long while the paratype is 40 mm long. The cephalon is large, ovoid and strongly vaulted anterodorsally. The trunk is moderately flexed dorsally and composed of eleven overlapping tergites. The paratype preserves what might be the anus and parts of the digestive tract.

== Classification ==
Cladogram by Ortega-Hernández et al., 2012:

- Aglaspidida
  - - Uarthrus
    - - Flobertia
      - - Cyclopites
        - - Chlupacaris
          - Tremaglaspis
    - - - Chraspedops
        - Australaglaspis
      - - Aglaspella
        - - Aglaspis
          - Glypharthrus

Cladogram by Leroset-Aubril et al., 2017:

- Aglaspidida
  - Australaglaspis
  - - Beckwithia
    - - Tremaglaspididae
        - Flobertia
        - - Cyclopites
          - - Chlupacaris
            - - Quasimodaspis
              - - Tremaglaspis unite
                - - Tremaglaspis vanroyi
                  - Brachyaglaspis
      - Aglaspididae
        - Uarthrus
        - - Aglaspella
          - - Gogglops
            - - Glypharthrus simplex
              - Aglaspis
          - - Chraspedops
            - - Glypharthrus thomasi
              - - Glypharthrus trispinicaudatus
                - Glypharthrus magnoculus
