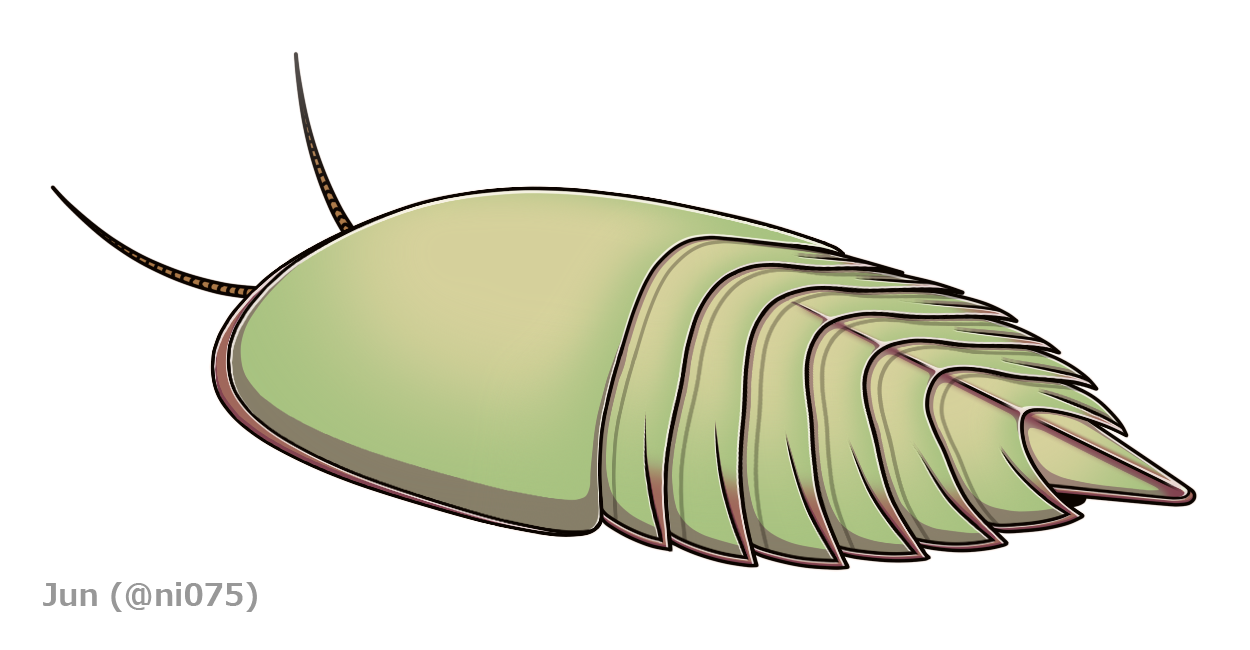
- Reconstruction of B. singularis

Scientific classification
- Kingdom: Animalia
- Phylum: Arthropoda
- Clade: †Artiopoda
- Order: †Aglaspidida
- Family: †Tremaglaspididae
- Genus: †Brachyaglaspis; Ortega-Hernández, Van Roy and Lerosey-Aubril 2016
- Species: †B. singularis

Binomial name
- †Brachyaglaspis singularis Ortega-Hernández, Van Roy and Lerosey-Aubril 2016

= Brachyaglaspis =

Brachyaglaspis Temporal range: Floian

Genus of extinct arthropod

Brachyaglaspis is a genus of aglaspidid of the family Tremaglaspididae from the Fezouata Formation (Tremadocian to Floian). There is only one species, B. singularis.

== Distribution ==
Brachyaglaspis is known from a single, nearly complete specimen from the Floian aged section of the Fezouata Formation in Morocco. It is the second confirmed aglaspidid from the Fezouata Formation and the third aglaspidid known from the Ordovician period.

== Description ==
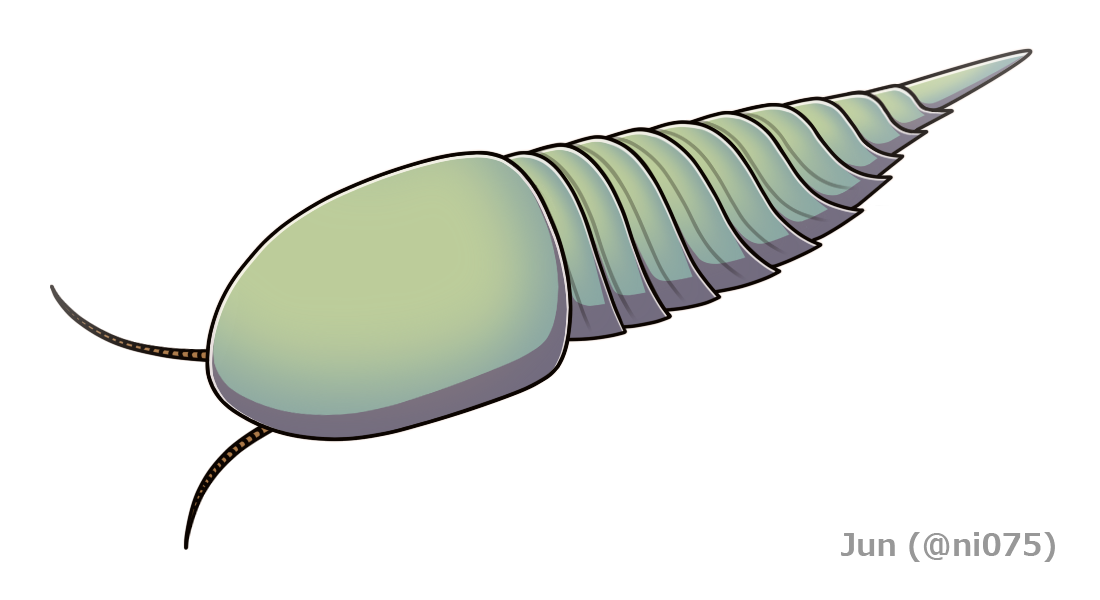
Other aglaspidids such as Tremaglaspis unite had more segments than Brachyaglaspis.

Brachyaglaspis was an unusual aglaspidid. For an aglaspidid, Brachyaglaspis had a relatively large head with no eyes, no antennae are known. It’s trunk had six tergites and a short almond shaped tail spine, while other aglaspidids known from relatively complete specimens have ten or more tergites, with the members of the family Aglaspidida having more segments than the Tremaglaspididae, of which Brachyaglaspis belongs to.

== Etymology ==
The genus name, Brachyaglaspis comes from the Latin brachy for short and Aglaspis, a related genus, the species name, singularis means singular in Latin reflecting its uniqueness among aglaspidids.
