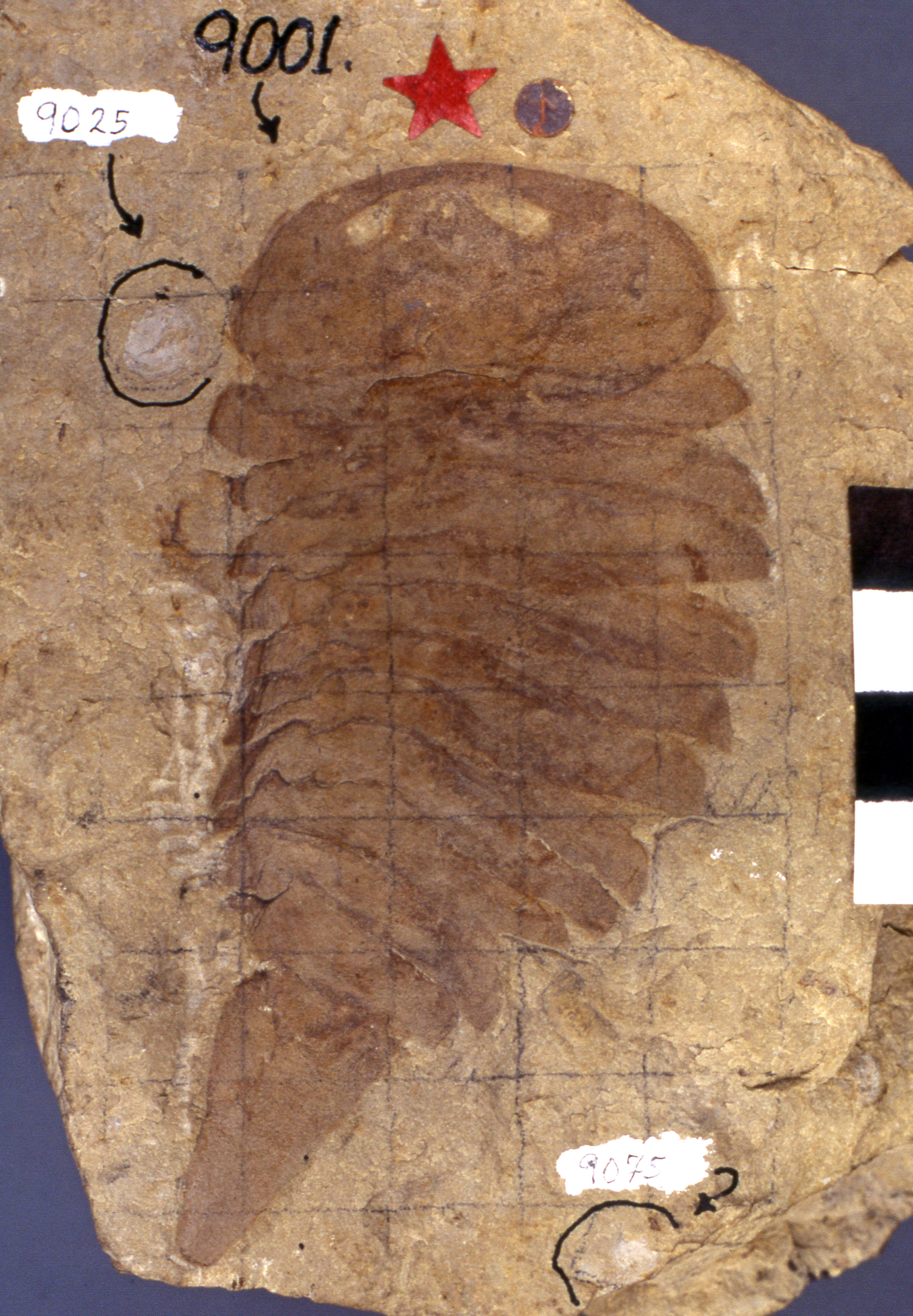
- Fossil of Strabops thacheri.

Scientific classification
- Kingdom: Animalia
- Phylum: Arthropoda
- Clade: Arachnomorpha
- Order: †Strabopida; Hou & Bergström, 1997
- Family: †Strabopidae; Gerhardt, 1932

Type species
- †Strabops thacheri Beecher, 1901

Genera
- †Khankaspis?; †Paleomerus; †Parapaleomerus; †Strabops

= Strabopidae =

Strabopidae Temporal range: Cambrian

Extinct family of arthropods

Strabopidae is the only family of the order Strabopida, an extinct group of arthropods known from the Cambrian period.

The order Strabopida contains three valid genera and one doubtful, Khankaspis, Paleomerus, Parapaleomerus and Strabops, all assigned in the family Strabopidae. Previously, it also contained the genera Caryon, Lemoneites and Neostrabops, but after a study, they were reassigned as a trilobite, a glyptocystitid echinoderm and a cheloniellid arthropod, respectively.

Paleomeridae was also previously included as a family, but after the discovery of a fourth Paleomerus specimen and its study, Paleomeridae was synonymized into Strabopidae. Although often suggested to be closely related to aglaspidids due to their similar morphology, their exact phylogenetic placement is uncertain due to the poor preservation of all known strabopids. A 2013 attempt to place them in a phylogenetic analysis recovered them as part of a polytomy with megacheirans, marrellomorphs, crustaceans and artiopodans. Still, strabopids are often classified as part of the clade Arachnomorpha. In fact, Dunlop & Selden (1998) defined Paleomerus as "perhaps the best model of a primitive arachnomorph".
