= Angarocaris =

Scientific classification
- Kingdom: Animalia
- Phylum: Arthropoda
- Order: †Aglaspidida?
- Genus: Angarocaris Tchernyshev, 1953

Extinct genus of arthropods

Angarocaris is an extinct genus of arthropods known from Ordovician deposits on the Siberian Platform. It may be a member of Aglaspidida.
