= Aglaspoides =

Aglaspoides Temporal range: Upper Cambrian

Scientific classification
- Kingdom: Animalia
- Phylum: Arthropoda
- Clade: †Artiopoda
- Order: †Aglaspidida
- Family: †Aglaspididae
- Genus: †Aglaspoides; Raasch, 1939

Extinct genus of arthropods

Aglaspoides is an extinct genus of aglaspid arthropod.
