= Lemoneites =

Lemoneites Temporal range: Ordovician

Scientific classification
- Kingdom: Animalia
- Phylum: Echinodermata
- Class: †Cystoidea
- Order: †Glyptocystitida
- Genus: †Lemoneites Flower, 1969
- Species: †L. mirabilis

Binomial name
- †Lemoneites mirabilis Flower, 1969

Genus of echinoderms (fossil)

Lemoneites is a genus of glyptocystitid cystoids, a group of extinct blastozoan echinoderms, known from the Ordovician period. It contains a single species, L. mirabilis, known from fossils found in the El Paso Formation (Note: Flower (1964) proposed promoting the El Paso Formation to group rank and subdivided it into newly proposed formations. Under this classification, Lemoneites is considered to be in the lower part of the Scenic Drive Formation within the El Paso Group.) of the Franklin Mountains in Texas. The fossils are preserved as silica replacements etched in dolomite. The genus was first described in 1969 by Rousseau H. Flower, who originally described it as an aglaspidid within its own family, Lemoneitidae, and interpreted it as having a combination of features of aglaspidids and synziphosurines. Following this interpretation, later authors placed or compared Lemoneites with either aglaspidids or xiphosurans in cladistic analyses. Later, it would be assigned to the order Strabopida. A restudy of the original specimens by Moore and Braddy (2005) suggested Flower's interpretation of Lemoneites as an aglaspidid or xiphosuran to be incorrect and instead indicated it had an affinity with the extinct echinoderm order Glyptocystitida. In Flower's original description of Lemoneites, he described in the genus four species: L. mirabilis, L. ambiguus, L. gomphocaudatus, and L. simplex. The latter three are now considered synonyms of L. mirabilis, as according to Moore and Braddy (2005) there are insufficient characters to justify separating the four species.
