= Australaglaspis =

Australaglaspis Temporal range: Late Cambrian

Scientific classification
- Kingdom: Animalia
- Phylum: Arthropoda
- Clade: †Artiopoda
- Order: †Aglaspidida
- Genus: †Australaglaspis; Ortega-Hernández, 2010

Extinct genus of arthropods

Australaglaspis stoneyensis is an aglaspid that superficially resembles a horseshoe crab, or trilobite. It is known from Idamean-aged strata (Late Cambrian) at Stoney Point in north-west Tasmania.
