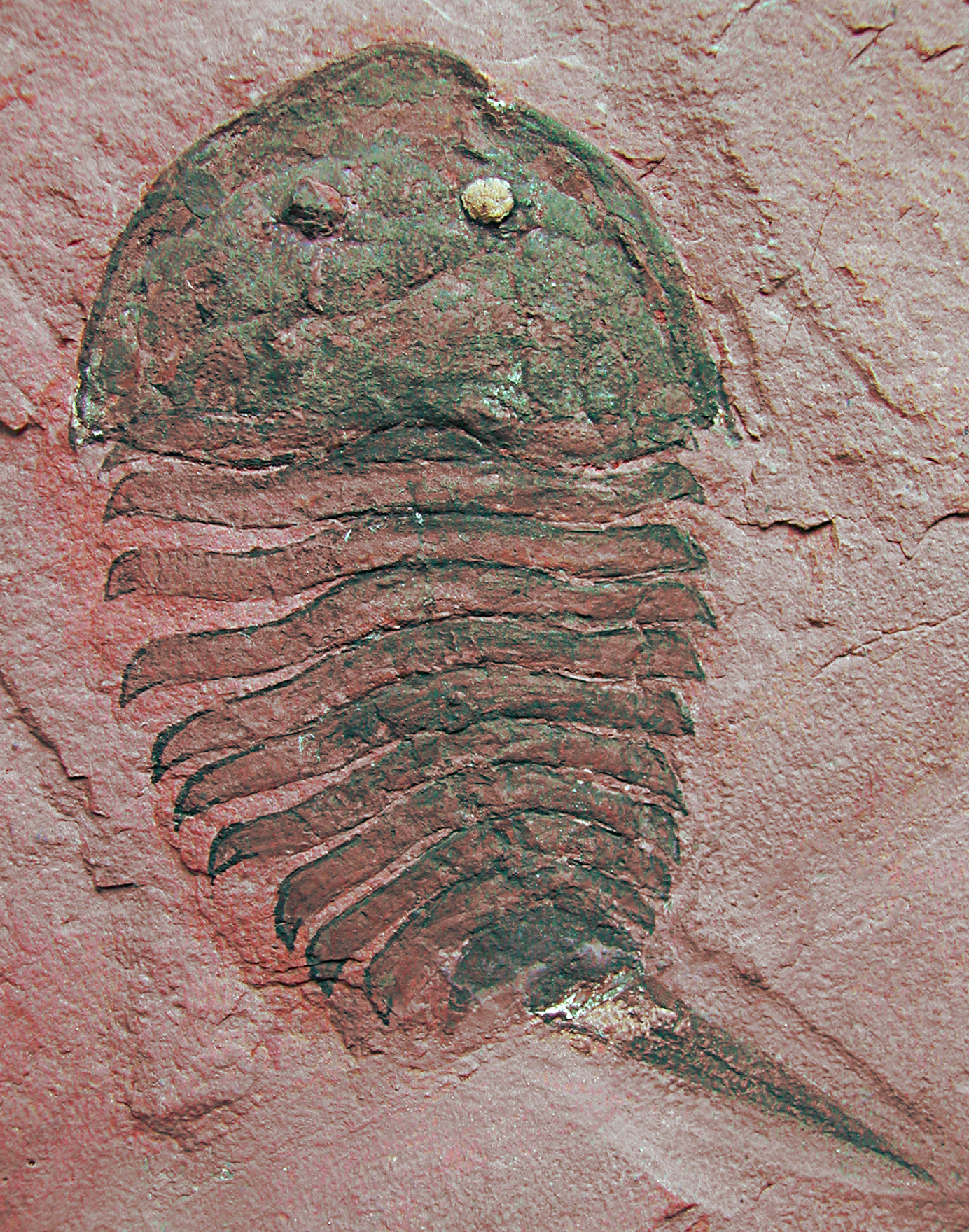
- Beckwithia typa collected in the Weeks Formation, Utah

Scientific classification
- Kingdom: Animalia
- Phylum: Arthropoda
- Clade: †Artiopoda
- (unranked): †Vicissicaudata
- Order: †Aglaspidida
- Genus: †Beckwithia; Resser, 1931
- Species: †B. typa

Binomial name
- †Beckwithia typa Resser, 1931

= Beckwithia typa =

Beckwithia typa Temporal range: 502–492 Ma Middle/Upper Cambrian

Extinct genus of arthropods

Beckwithia is an extinct genus of average to large size (5 centimetres or 2.0 inches to 12 centimetres or 4.7 inches), soft bodied artiopodan arthropods that lived during the late Middle and Upper Cambrian on the former paleocontinent Laurentia, in what are now Utah and Wisconsin. It has an inverted egg-shape, with a semi-circular head, 11 abdominal segments and a tail spine. It is a typical member of the group Aglaspidida.

== Etymology ==
Beckwithia was named after Frank Beckwith, editor and publisher of the Millard County Chronicle of Delta, Utah in the early to middle 1900s, who had a passion for trilobites.

== Distribution ==
Beckwithia has been collected from the Middle and Upper Cambrian of Utah (Weeks Formation, House Range, Millard County) and from the Franconian (in North-America called Sunwaptan) of Wisconsin.

== Taxonomic history ==
Beckwithia was previously placed in a separate family, the Beckwithiidae, but it has now been established that the defining character (that the terminal segments appeared to be fused) is actually an artifact.

== Description ==
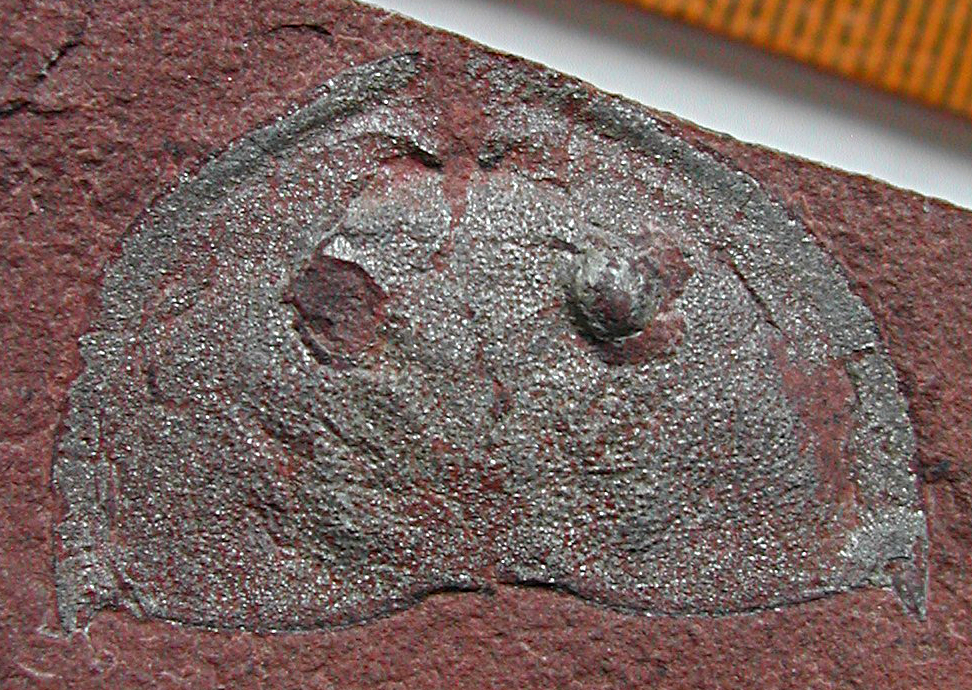
A cephalon of Beckwithia typa, 25 mm

The outline of the exoskeleton of Beckwithia is an inverted egg-shape with a stout sword-like tail spine or telson. The dorsal shield covering the cephalothorax (or prosoma) is semi-circular, with the margin curving smoothly from the front to an acute, but rather small genal spine at the outside and the back. The front and side margin is bordered by a flatted and undecorated zone of almost constant length/width. The area within that band is densely covered in pustules. Two distinctly raised eyes that are circular to oval are located at the outer rim of what could be compared to a trilobite glabella, with a strongly effaced outline and lobes. The abdomen (or opisthosoma) consists of 11 segments (or possibly sometimes 10 or 12) perpendicular to the midline, that terminate to the sides in small spines that angle to the back. Each segment carries a spine at midline too that is directed backward, a character that distinguishes Beckwithia from other Aglaspidid genera. Only one species, Beckwithia typa, is currently recognized.
