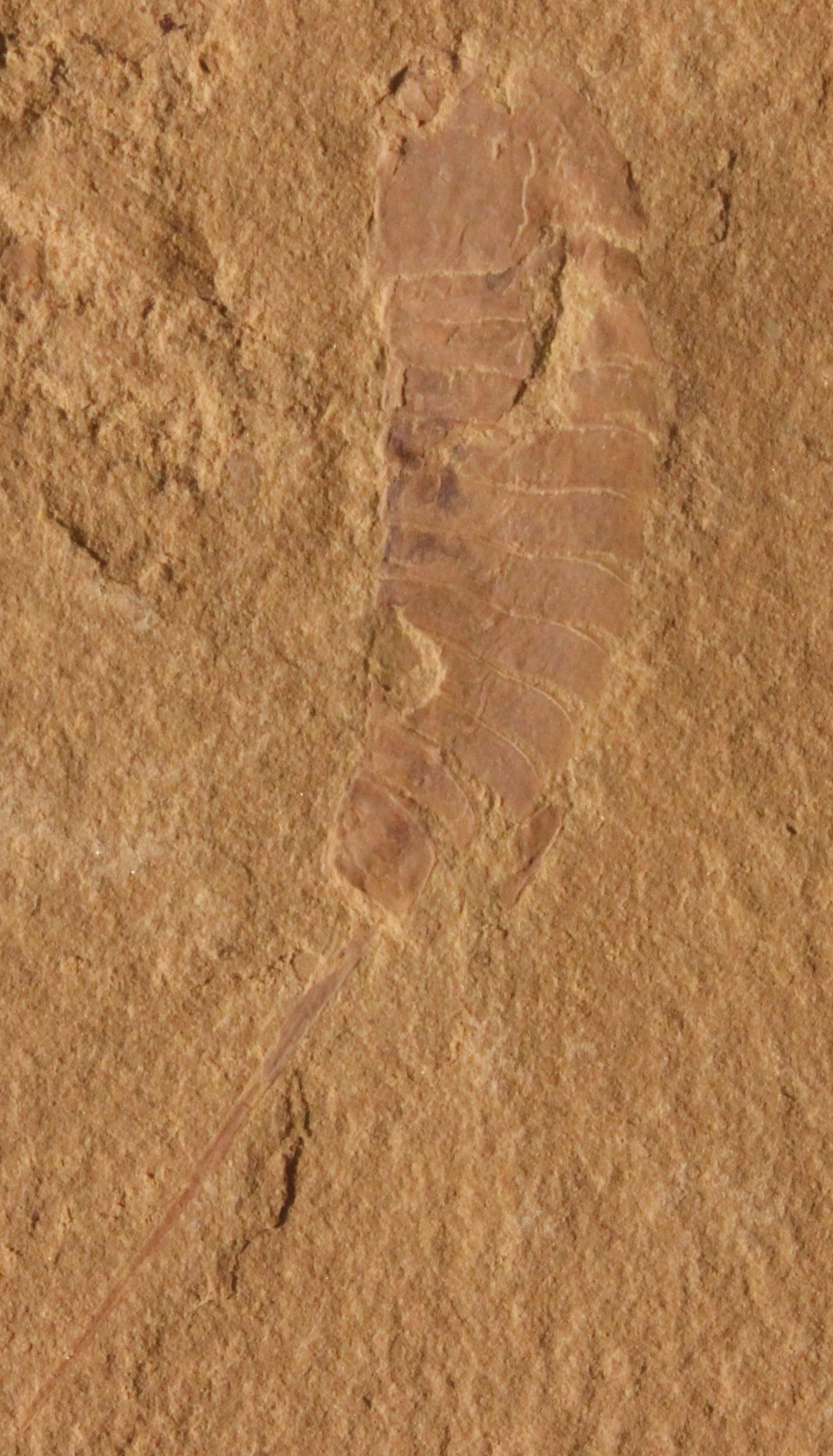
- Cyclopites vulgaris (Raasch, 1939); Saint Lawrence Formation; Furongian; Baraboo, Wisconsin. Due to peculiarities of preservation, only the right half of the body is preserved on this specimen. Note the long, slender telson at the posterior end of the animal, and the location of the eye near the midline. Collected by Kenneth E. Gass. Specimen is 4cm long.

Scientific classification
- Kingdom: Animalia
- Phylum: Arthropoda
- Clade: †Artiopoda
- (unranked): †Vicissicaudata
- Order: †Aglaspidida
- Family: †Tremaglaspididae
- Genus: †Cyclopites; Raasch, 1951
- Species: †C. vulgaris

Binomial name
- †Cyclopites vulgaris Raasch, 1939

= Cyclopites =

Cyclopites Temporal range: Furongian

Extinct genus of arthropods

Cyclopites is a genus of aglaspidid arthropods that lived in shallow seas in what is now Wisconsin during Late Cambrian times. It is distinguished from other aglaspidids by the extreme proximity of its eyes. The genus earns its name from this presence of what might appear to be a single, central eye.
