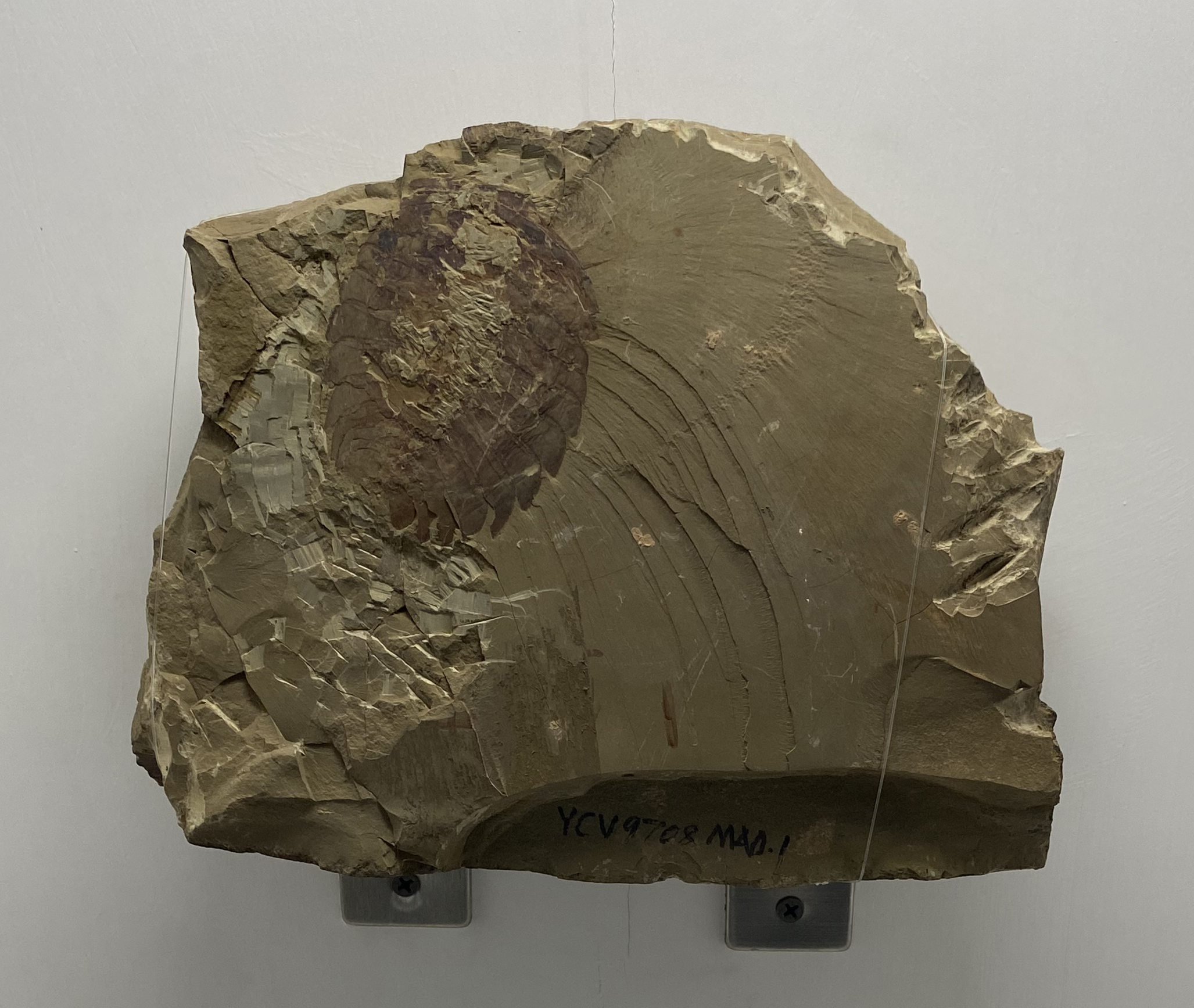
- Fossil of Parapaleomerua sinensis in Yuxi Museum

Scientific classification
- Kingdom: Animalia
- Phylum: Arthropoda
- Order: †Strabopida
- Family: †Strabopidae
- Genus: †Parapaleomerus; Hou et al., 1999
- Species: †P. sinensis

Binomial name
- †Parapaleomerus sinensis Hou et al., 1999

= Parapaleomerus =

Parapaleomerus Temporal range: Lower Cambrian

Extinct genus of arthropods

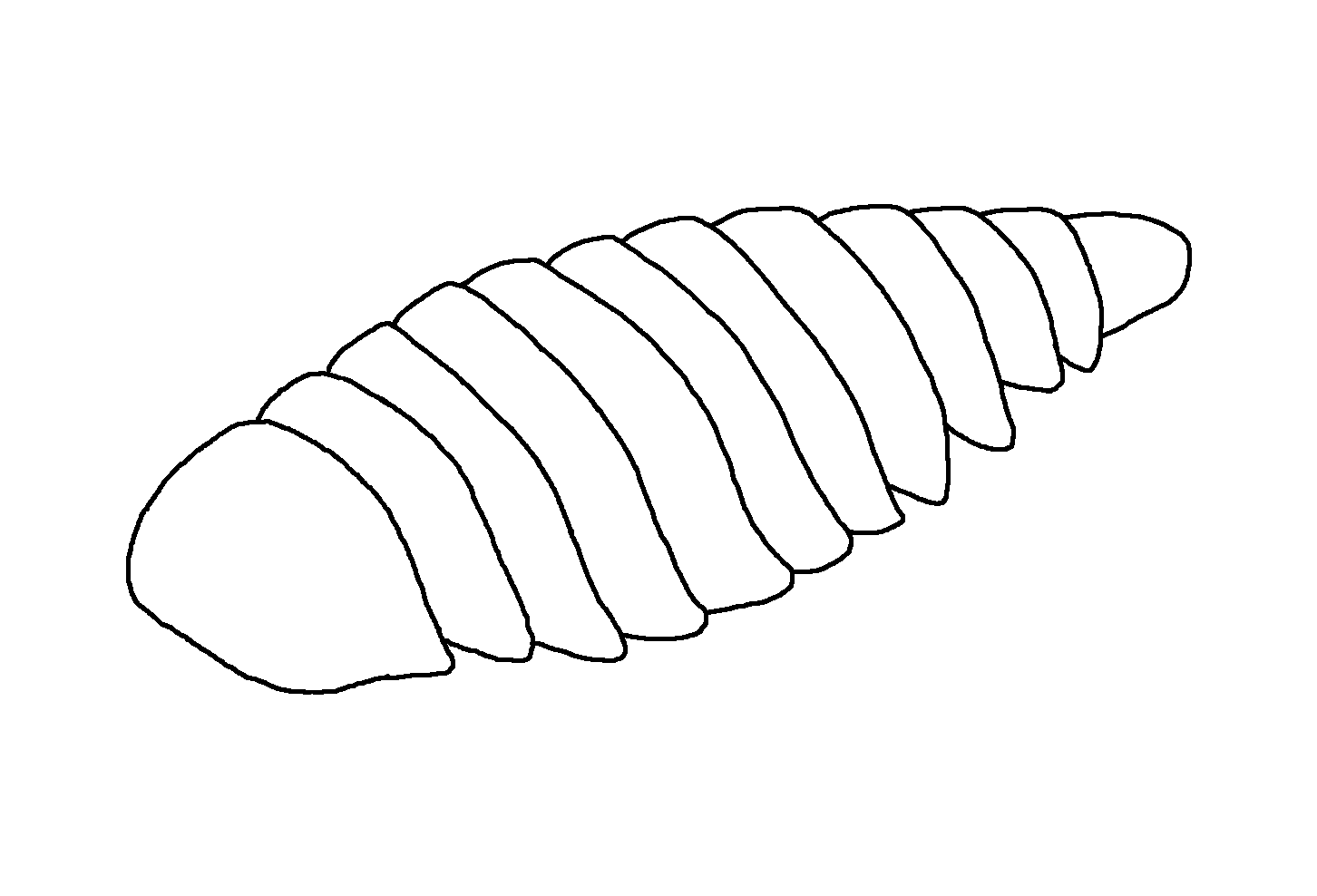
Restoration of P. sinensis without eyes, 11th segment and appendages omitted. Telson hypothetical

Parapaleomerus is a genus of strabopid of small size found in Chengjiang biota, China. It contains one species, Parapaleomerus sinensis. Unlike the other members of Strabopida, Parapaleomerus lacks dorsal eyes and only possesses ten trunk tergites. The telson has been described as trapezoidal. All the trunk tergites are straight and increasingly curve backwards abaxially from T4–10. Specimens of Parapaleomerus sinesis are typically dorsoventrally compressed. The exoskeleton of P. sinensis has a semi-elliptical head shield that lacks any indication of the presence of dorsal eyes. The largest specimen described is recorded as 9.2 cm long, with a maximum width of 9 cm.
