= Khankaspis =

Khankaspis Temporal range: Middle-Late Cambrian ~501–488.3 Ma

Scientific classification
- Kingdom: Animalia
- Phylum: Arthropoda
- Order: †Strabopida
- Family: †Strabopidae
- Genus: †Khankaspis; Repina & Okuneva, 1969

Type species
- †Khankaspis bazhanovi Repina & Okuneva, 1969

Arthropod genus

Khankaspis is a poorly preserved arthropod genus that contains one species, K. bazhanovi, recovered from the Snegurovka Formation of Siberia, Russia. Some authors have placed Khankaspis within the order Strabopida, but poorly preserved material precludes detailed comparisons with other Cambrian arthropods.
