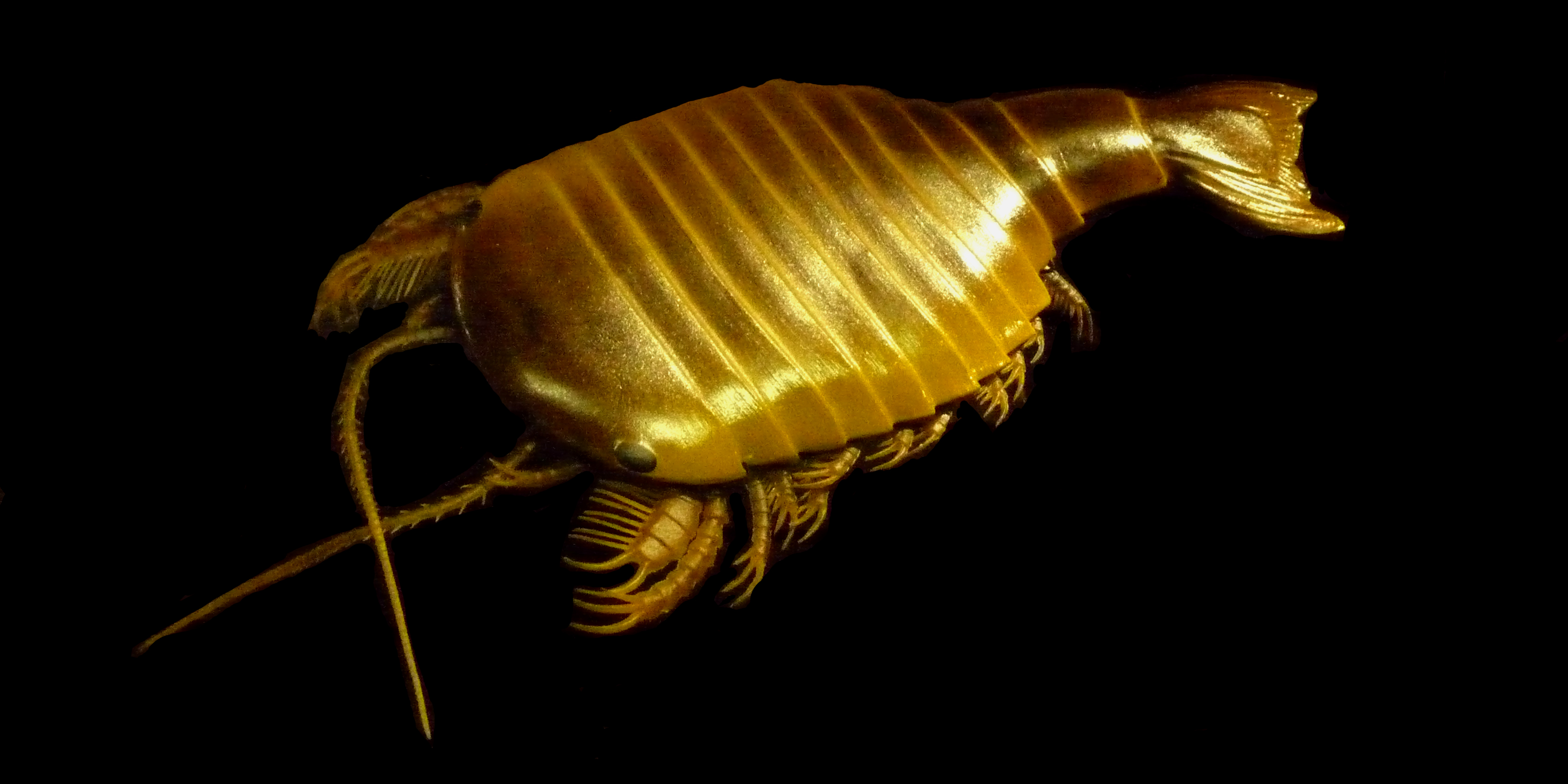

Scientific classification
- Kingdom: Animalia
- Phylum: Arthropoda
- Subphylum: ?Chelicerata
- Class: †Merostomoidea Størmer, 1944

Orders
- Limulavida; Emeraldellida

= Merostomoidea =

Merostomoidea Temporal range: Cambrian

Merostomoidea is a paraphyletic group of fossil arthropods, considered a transitional form between trilobites and true chelicerates.

== Sources ==
- https://web.archive.org/web/20101221002449/http://palaeos.com/Invertebrates/Arthropods/Arachnomorpha.html#Merostomoidea
