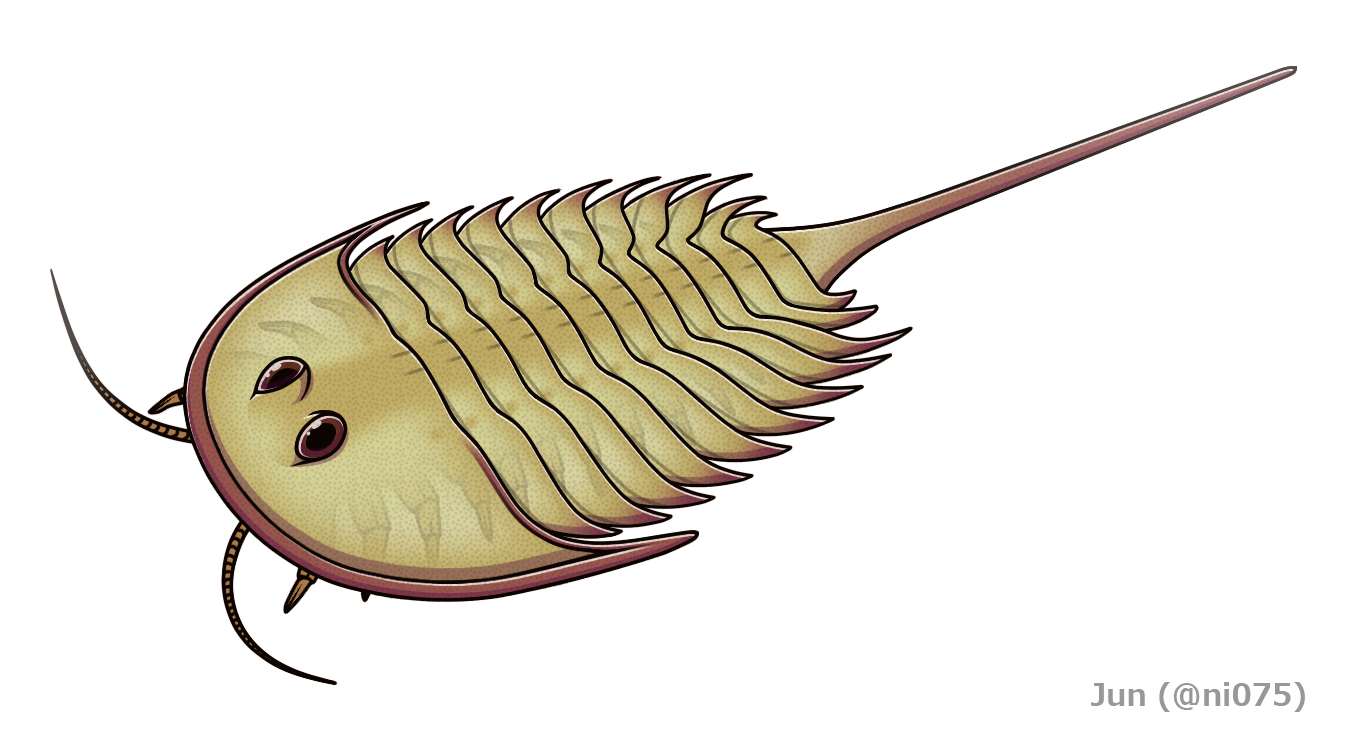
- Aglaspis spinifer
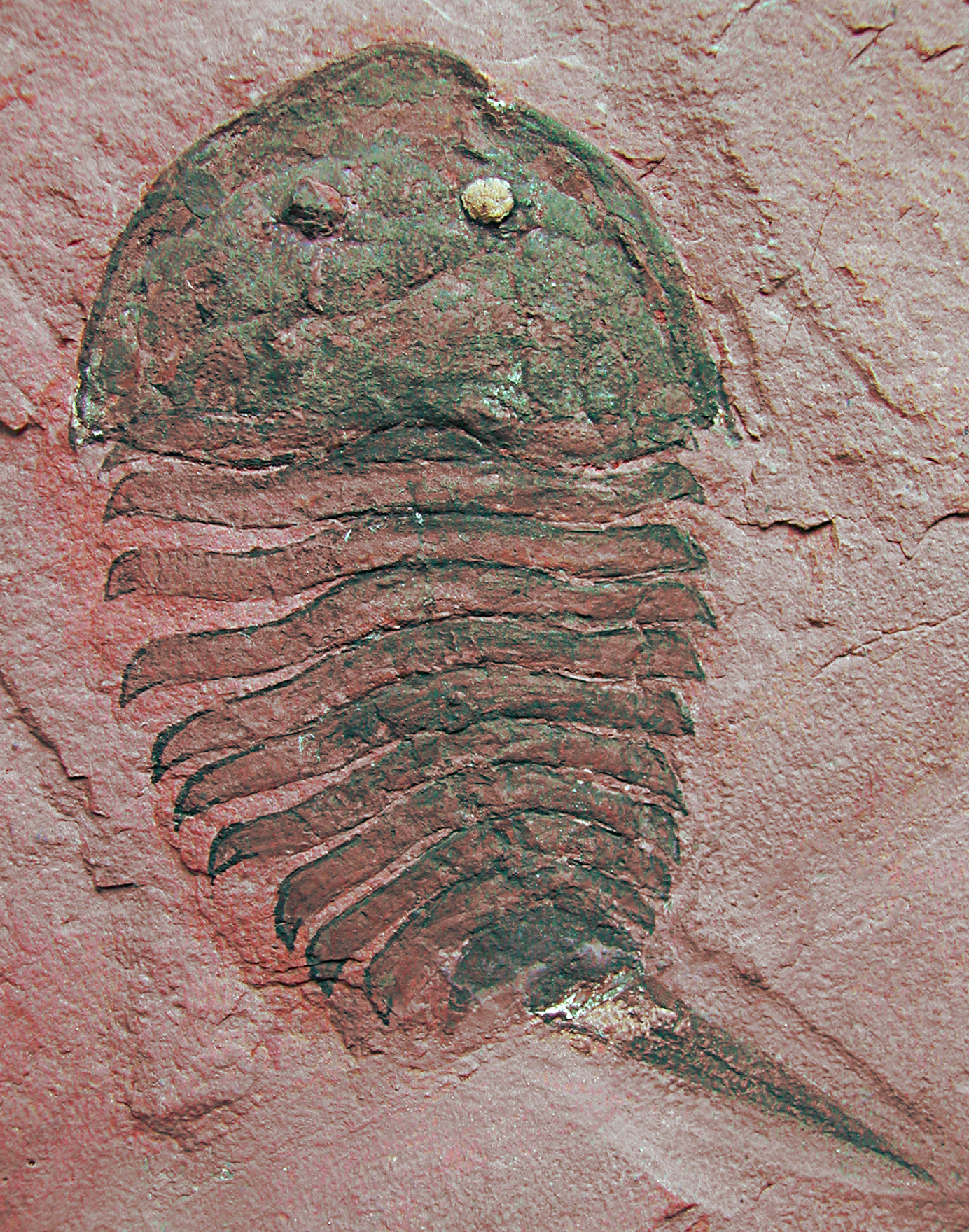
- Fossil of Beckwithia typa

Scientific classification
- Kingdom: Animalia
- Phylum: Arthropoda
- Clade: †Artiopoda
- Superclass: †Vicissicaudata
- Order: †Aglaspidida; Raasch, 1939

Subtaxa
- †Australaglaspis; †Beckwithia; †Tremaglaspididae; †Brachyaglaspis; †Chlupacaris; †Cyclopites; †Flobertia; †Quasimodaspis; †Tremaglaspis; †Aglaspididae; †Aglaspella; †Aglaspis; †Aglaspoides; †Chraspedops; †Glypharthrus; †Gogglops; †Hesselbonia; †Setaspis; †Tuboculops; †Uarthrus

= Aglaspidida =

Aglaspidida Temporal range: Guzhangian–Katian

Extinct order of arthropods

Aglaspidida is an extinct order of marine arthropods known from fossils spanning the Middle Cambrian to the Upper Ordovician. Initially considered chelicerates, modern anatomical comparisons demonstrate that the aglaspidids cannot be accommodated within this group, and that they lie instead within the Artiopoda, thus placing them closer to the trilobites, being placed in the artiopod subgroup Vicissicaudata.

With 38 known valid species as of 2017, they represent one of the most diverse groups of early Paleozoic arthropods, after trilobites. Aglaspidid fossils are found in North America (United States and Canada), Europe, Australia, and China.

== Description ==
The exoskeletons of aglaspidids have frequently been suggested to have been phosphatic, though this may actually represent post-mortem taphonomic mineral replacement, and at least some members of the group definitively had calcified exoskeletons. The headshields ancestrally have a pair of unstalked eyes attached to the upper surface, which are attached to a raised region of the head that merges with the rest of the headshield frontwards (anteriorly) and towards the midline (medially), though some species appear to have lost their eyes entirely. The underside of the headshield (cephalon) had either four or possibly five pairs of attached limbs (including a pair of antennae). The trunk segments (tergites) were freely articulating (with the exception of the posteriormost one), and bore outwardly projecting pleurae. The body ends with a tailspine. A distinctive feature of aglaspididans are "postventral plates", a pair of two flat sclerotized plates located on the underside of the posterior final few segments of the body, covering the base of the tailspine. Most members of the group are around 2 centimetres (0.79 in) in length, though their length varies from 1 centimetre (0.39 in) up to a maximum of 13.5 centimetres (5.3 in) including the tailspine.

Members of the family Agaspididae (which constitute the majority of the group) are additionally defined as having a flat, wide body, with the posterior outer corners of the headshield having an acute to spinose shape, with the trunk ancestrally composed of 12 tergites, with the tailspine being elongate and fused to the posteriormost 12th trunk segment/tergite.

Members of Tremaglaspididae are characterised by having a short tailspine (less than half the length of the trunk), reduction or complete loss of eyes, the headshield having rounded angles, the trunk having a vaulted shape and being composed of 11 or less (minimum 6) tergites.

Gallery of aglaspididans
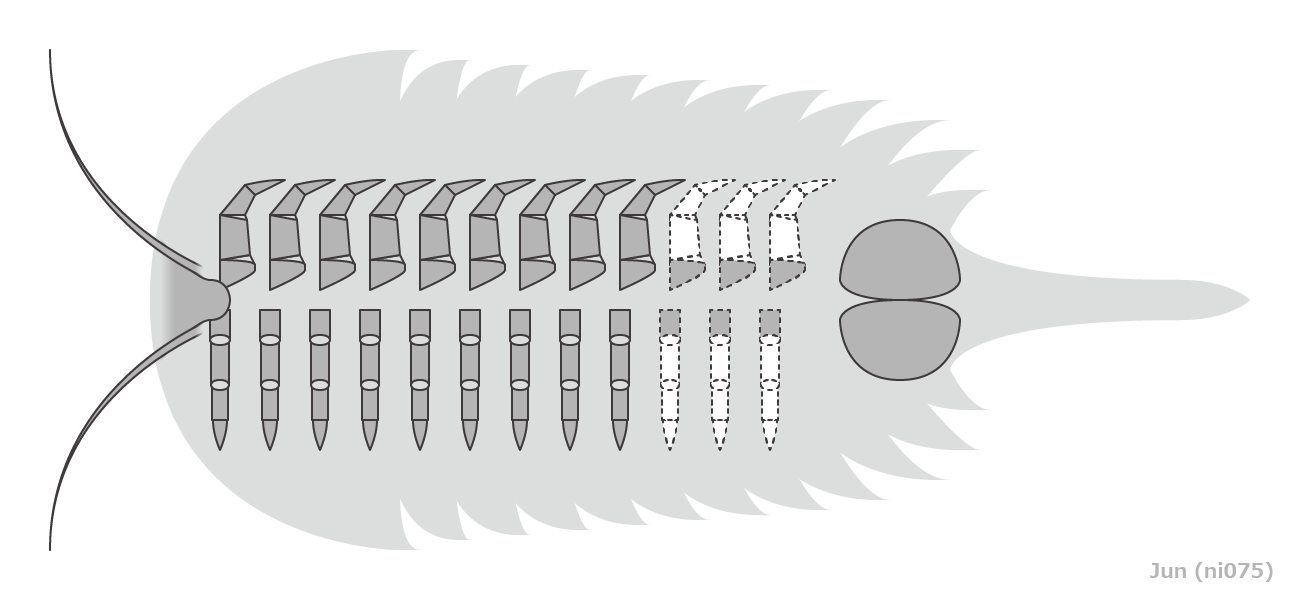
Diagram of aglaspididan underside anatomy

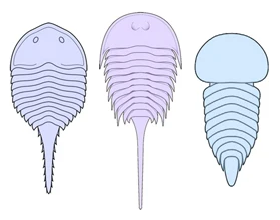
Diagram of Beckwithia typa, a basal aglaspididan (left), Aglaspis spinifer (Agaspididae) (middle) and Tremaglaspis vanroyi (Tremaglaspididae) (right)

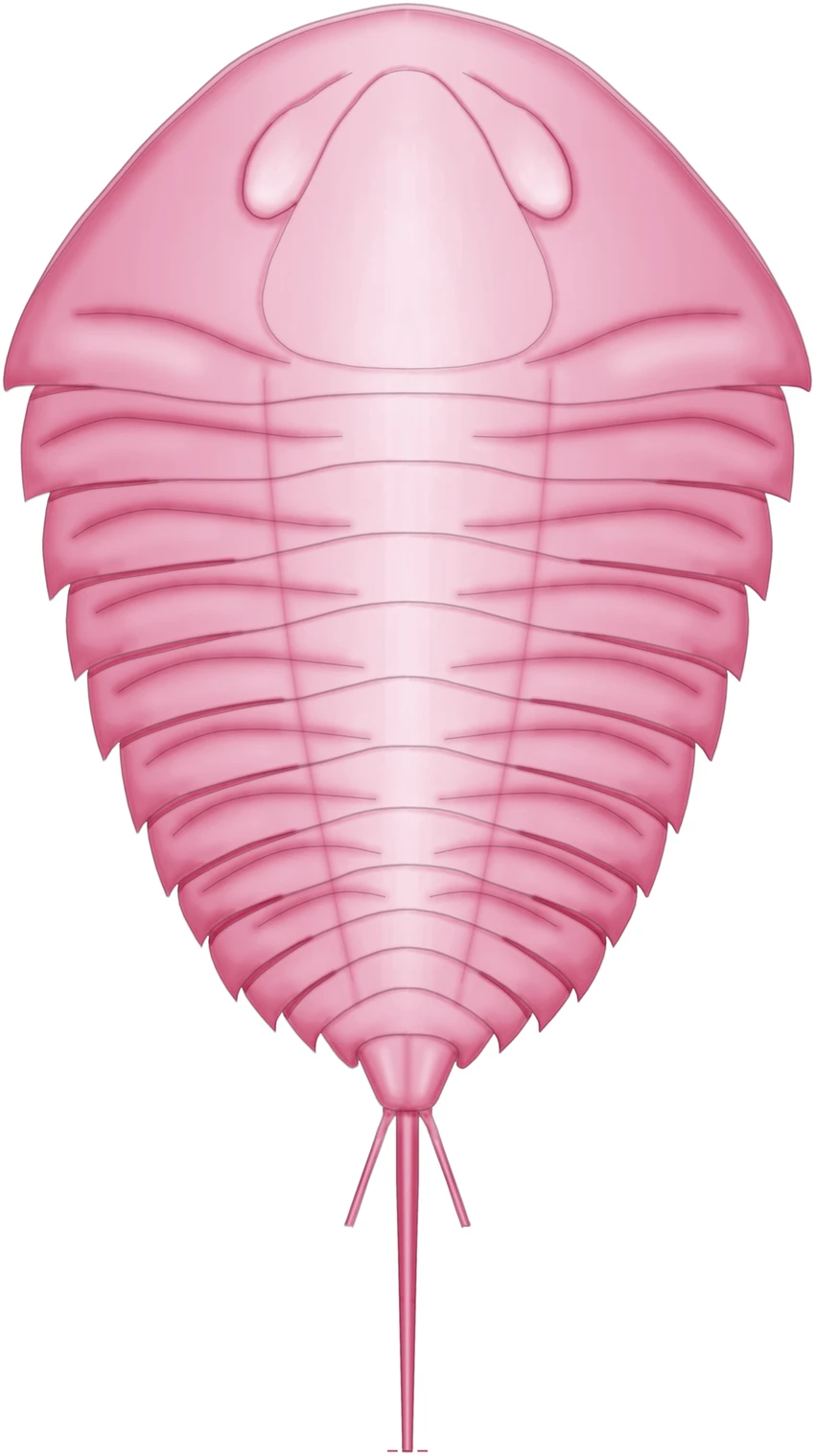
View of Glypharthrus trispinicaudatus (Agaspididae) from above

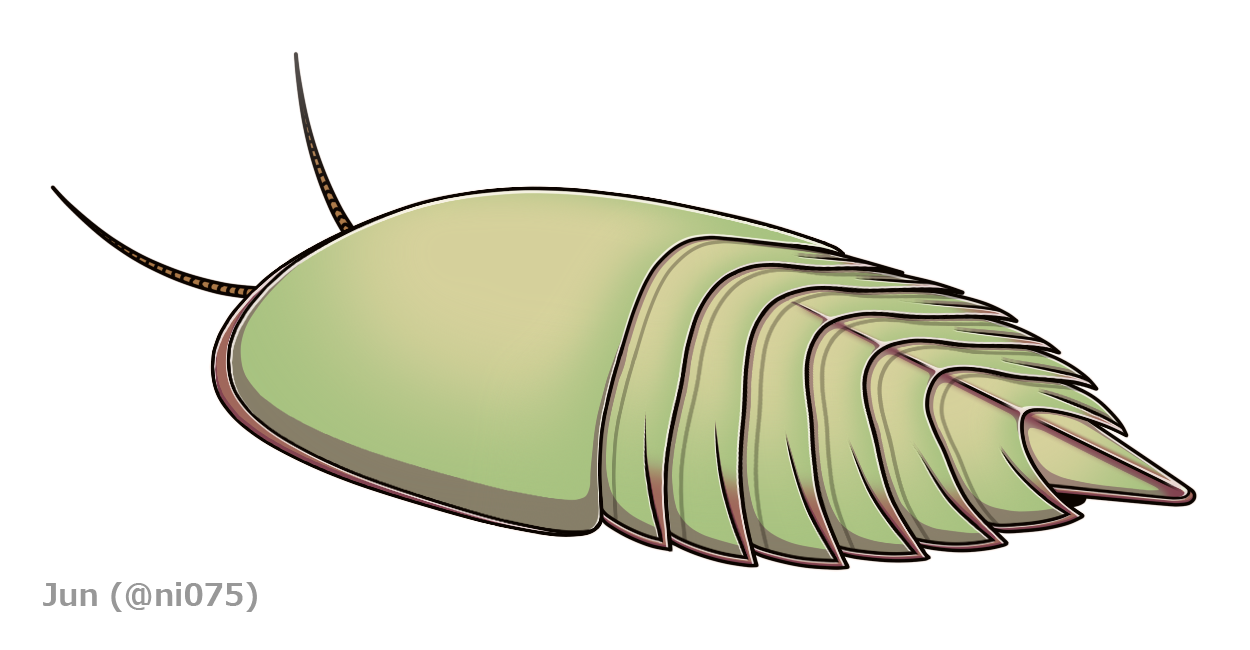
Life restoration of Brachyaglaspis singularis (Tremaglaspididae)

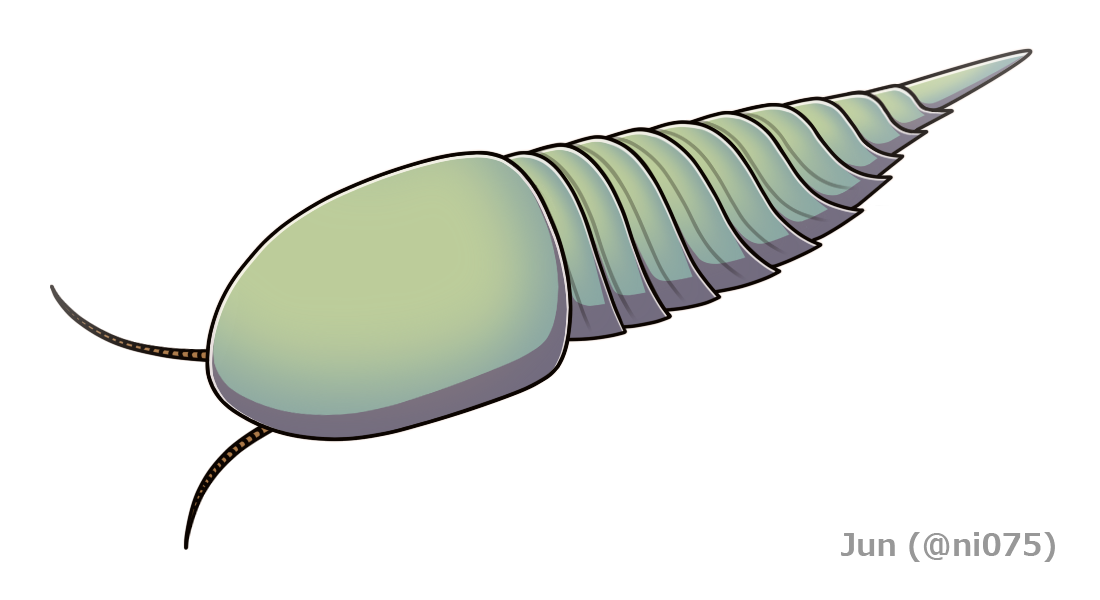
Life restoration of Tremaglaspis unite (Tremaglaspididae)

== Ecology ==
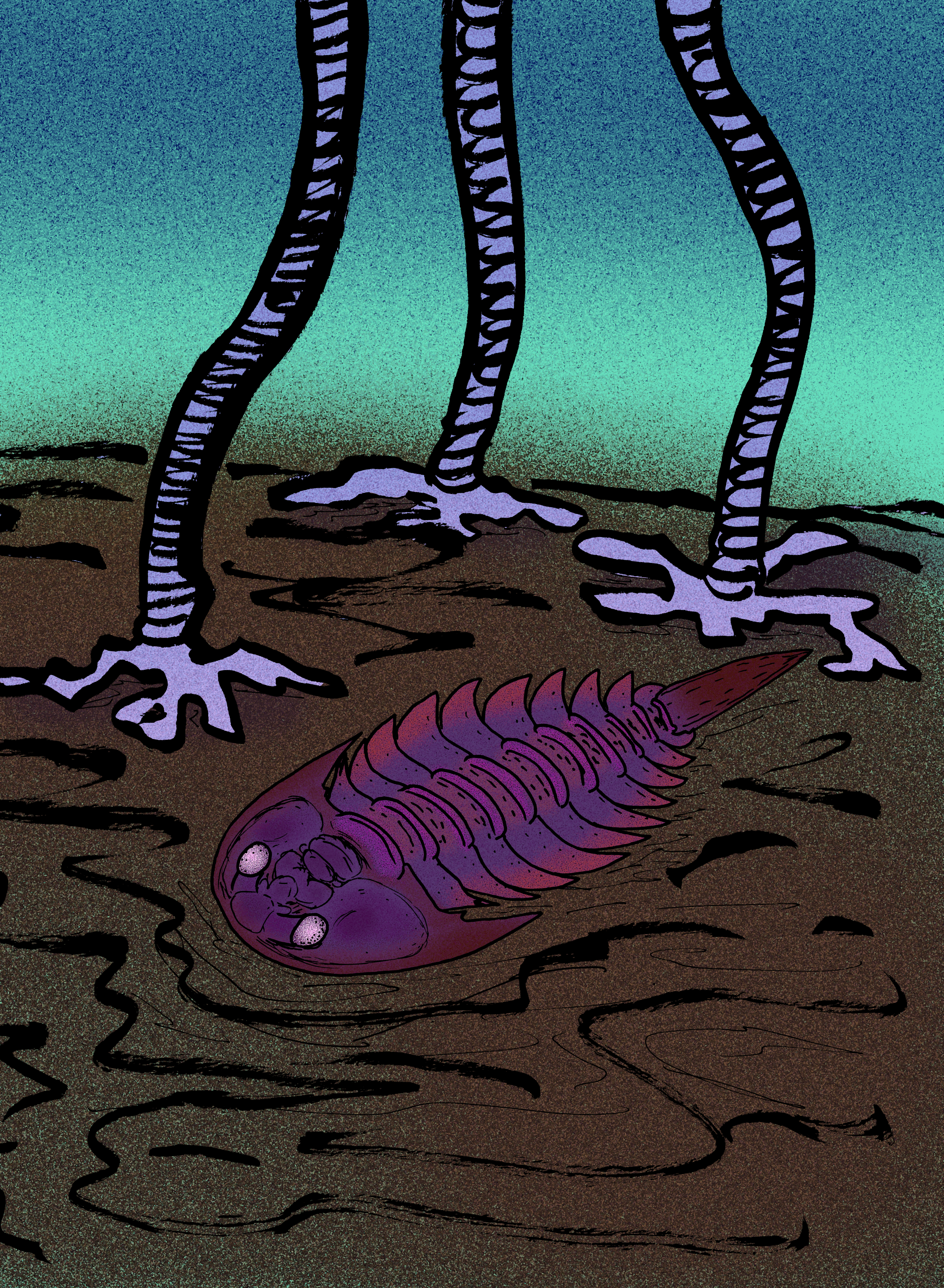
Restoration of Gogglops (Aglaspididae) on the seafloor (note:body is hypothetical)

Aglaspidids are thought to have primarily inhabited shallow marine environments. Aglaspidids are suggested to have been predatory or scavengers, using their legs to pass food towards the (probably posteriorly directed) mouth. They are thought to have mostly been benthic animals that inhabited the seafloor (with trace fossils probably made by aglaspidids on the seafloor having been reported from the Upper Cambrian of Wisconsin), though Cyclopites may have been a swimming, nektonic animal.

== Evolution ==
Aglaspidida first appeared in Laurentia (what is now North America) during the Guzhangian stage of the upper Miaolingian (Cambrian Series 3), before undergoing a major radiation during the Furongian (Upper Cambrian), reaching a worldwide distribution during this period. During the Ordovician, remains are known from Avalonia (modern Wales), Gondwana (Morocco) and South China, with the youngest representative being known from the Katian stage of the Upper Ordovician in Morocco.

== Taxonomy ==
When aglaspidids were first described in the 1860s, they were initially considered to be crustaceans. Following the pioneering work on the group by Gilbert O. Raasch in his 1939 publication Cambrian Merostomata, who named the group and many genera of aglaspidids, they were considered to be chelicerates. However, research in the late 20th century challenged this hypothesis, and during the 21st century it became recognised that they belonged to a group called Vicissicaudata with taxa like Sidneyia, Emeraldella (both formerly classified as "xenopods") Cheloniellida, and Kodymirus, based on shared traits of the organisation of the final segments of the trunk. Vicissicaudata is generally placed within the Artiopoda, the broader group which contains trilobites and their close relatives.

=== List of genera ===
- †Australaglaspis (Late Cambrian, Australia)
- †Beckwithia (Middle-Late Cambrian, United States)
- †Tremaglaspididae
  - †Brachyaglaspis (Early Ordovician, Morocco)
  - †Chlupacaris (Late Ordovician, Morocco)
  - †Cyclopites (Late Cambrian, United States)
  - †Flobertia (Late Cambrian, United States)
  - †Quasimodaspis (Middle-Late Cambrian, United States)
  - †Tremaglaspis (Middle Cambrian, United States, Early Ordovician, Wales, unnamed possible species also known from the Early Ordovician of Morocco)
- †Aglaspididae
  - †Aglaspella (Late Cambrian, United States, South China)
  - †Aglaspis (Late Cambrian, United States)
  - †Aglaspoides (Late Cambrian, United States, possibly a synonym of Glyptarthus)
  - †Chraspedops (Late Cambrian, United States)
  - †Glypharthrus (Late Cambrian, United States, Canada, South China)
  - †Gogglops (Upper Ordovician, China)
  - †Hesselbonia (Late Cambrian, United States)
  - †Setaspis (Late Cambrian, United States)
  - †Tuboculops (Late Cambrian, United States)
  - †Uarthrus (Late Cambrian, United States)

Additionally, Obrutschewia, Angarocaris and Intejocaris, known from the Ordovician of the Siberian Platform, may also be members of the group. Certain other similar extinct arthropods are suggested to possibly be closely related to the aglaspidids, including members of the poorly known order Strabopida.

Cladogram of the position of Aglaspdida within Vicissicaudata, after McCoy et al. 2025:

- - Vicissicaudata
    - Molaria spinifera
    - - Emeraldella brocki
      - - Emeraldella brutoni
        - - - Sidneyia inexpectans
            - - Tardisia broedeae
              - Cheloniellida
          - - Carimersa neptuni
            - - Kodymirus vagans
              - - Eozetetes gemelli
                - Aglaspidida

Cladogram of Aglaspidida after Lerosey-Aubril, Zhu & Ortega-Hernández, 2017:

- Aglaspidida
  - Australaglaspis
  - - Beckwithia
    - - Tremaglaspididae
        - Flobertia
        - - Cyclopites
          - - Chlupacaris
            - - Quasimodaspis
              - - Tremaglaspis unite
                - - Tremaglaspis vanroyi
                  - Brachyaglaspis
      - Aglaspididae
        - Uarthrus
        - - Aglaspella
          - - Gogglops
            - - Glypharthrus simplex
              - Aglaspis
          - - Chraspedops
            - - Glypharthrus thomasi
              - - Glypharthrus trispinicaudatus
                - Glypharthrus magnoculus
