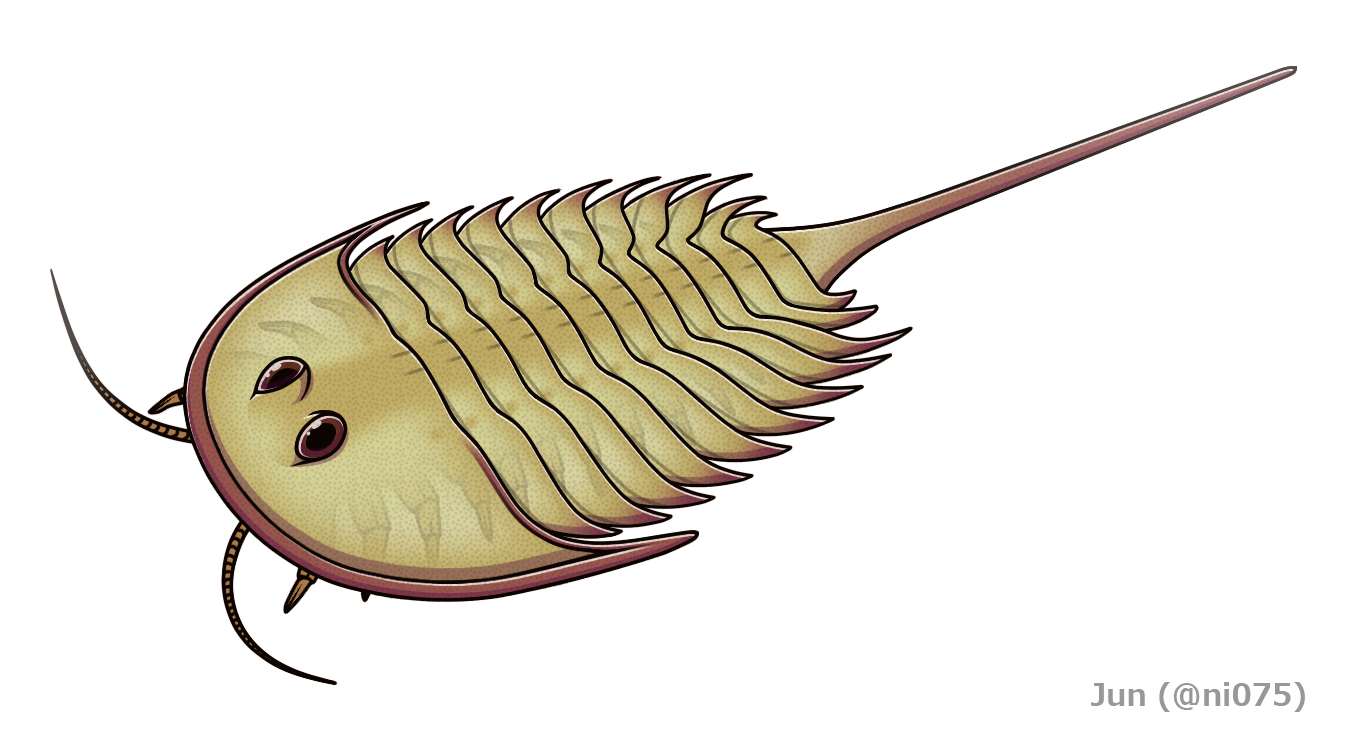
- Reconstruction of Aglaspis spinifer

Scientific classification
- Kingdom: Animalia
- Phylum: Arthropoda
- Clade: †Artiopoda
- Order: †Aglaspidida
- Family: †Aglaspididae
- Genus: †Aglaspis; Hall, 1862

Type species
- †Aglaspis barrandei Hall, 1862

Species
- Aglaspis barrandei Hall, 1862; Aglaspis spinifer Raasch, 1939

= Aglaspis =

Aglaspis Temporal range: Furongian
- Reconstruction of Aglaspis barrandei

Extinct genus of arthropods

Aglaspis is the type genus of the family Aglaspididae within the arthropod order Aglaspidida. It lived on the seafloor in what is now Wisconsin during late Cambrian times.
