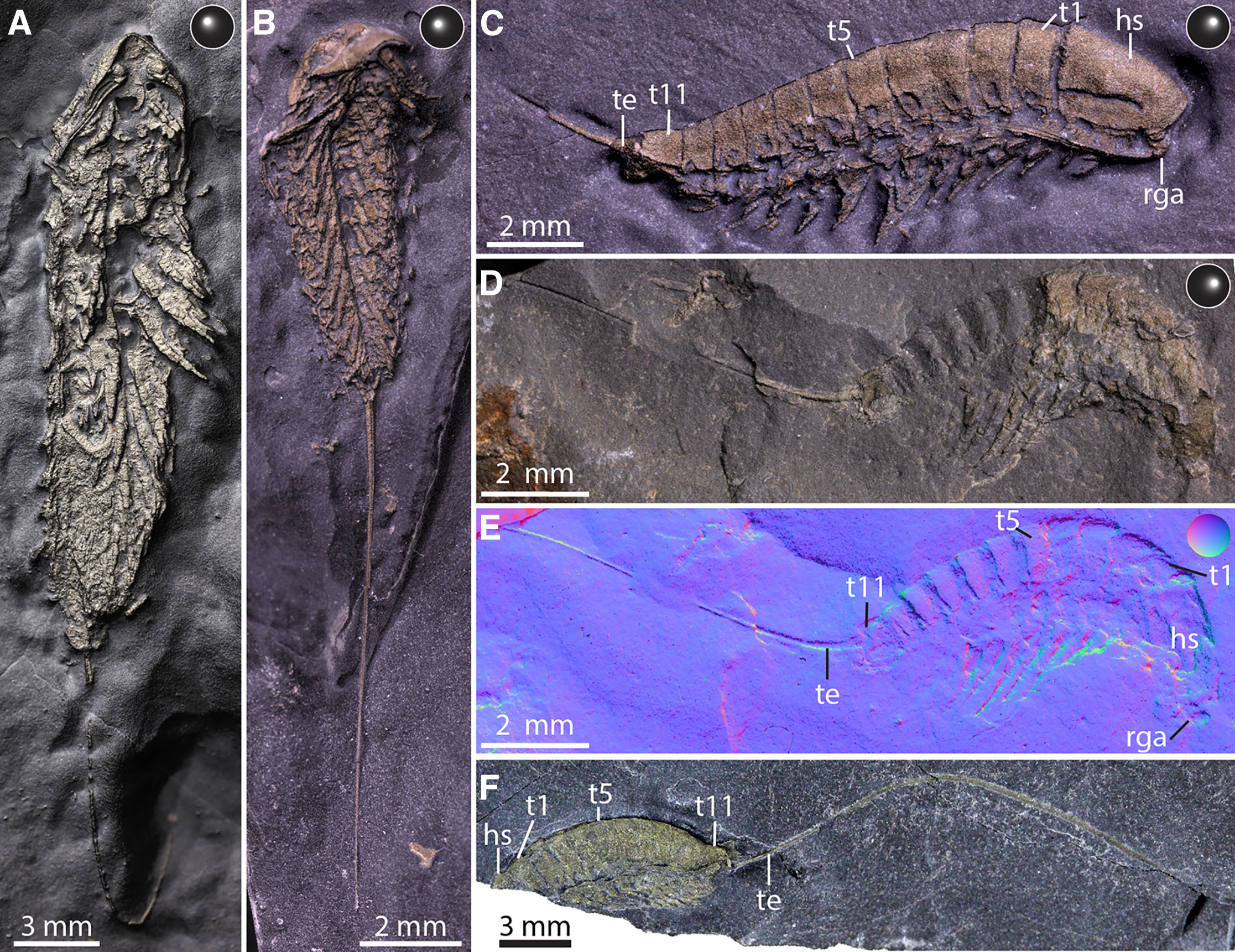
- Multiple specimens of L. edgecombei
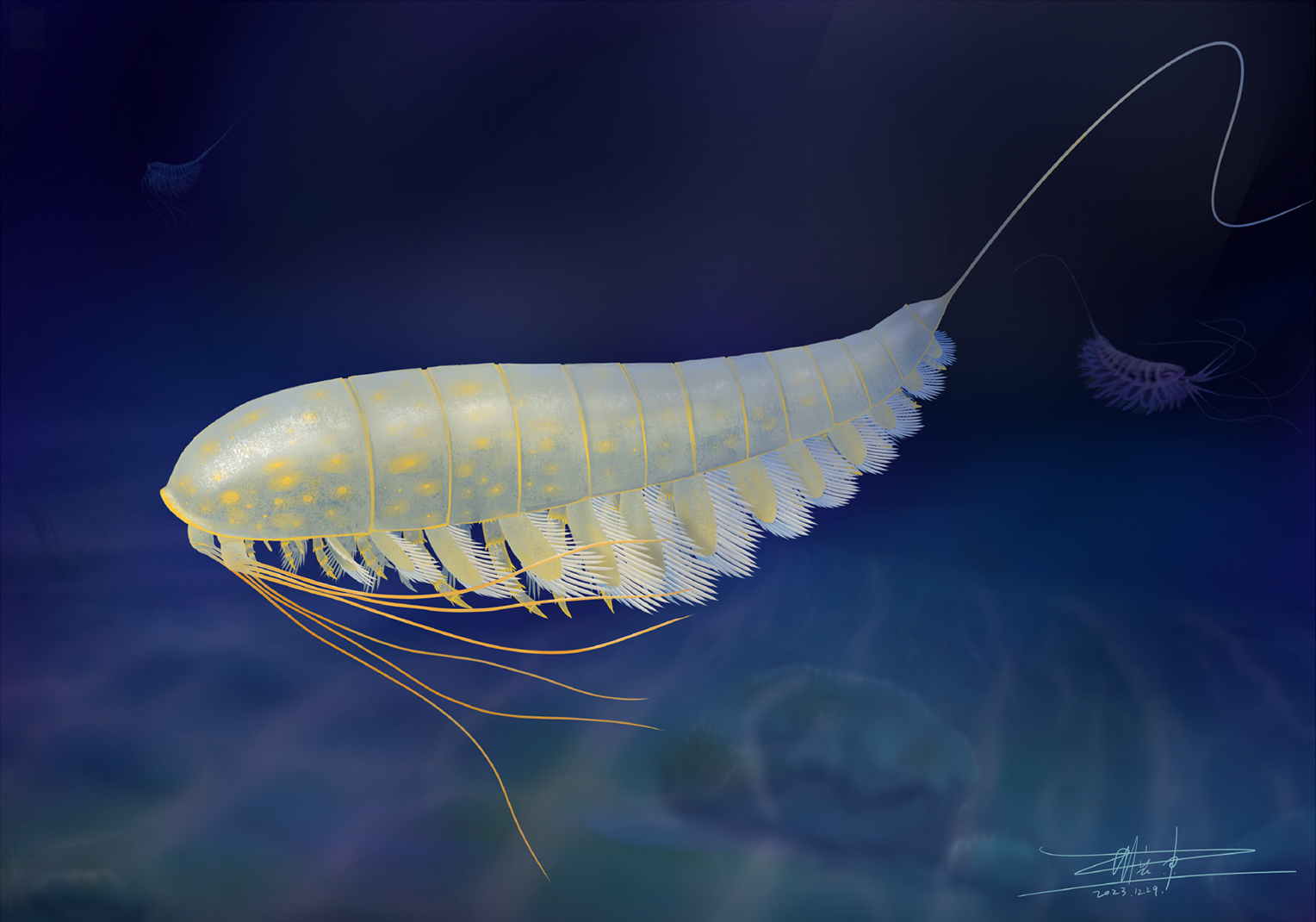
- Life reconstruction of L. edgecombei by Xiaodong Wang, and published by Parry et al., 2024.

Scientific classification
- Kingdom: Animalia
- Phylum: Arthropoda
- Class: †Megacheira
- Order: †Leanchoilida
- Family: †Leanchoiliidae
- Genus: †Lomankus; Parry et al., 2024
- Species: †L. edgecombei

Binomial name
- †Lomankus edgecombei Parry et al., 2024

= Lomankus =

Lomankus Temporal range: Katian

Extinct genus of Megacheiran Arthropod

Lomankus is an extinct genus of megacheiran (great appendage) arthropod known from the upper Ordovician aged Beecher's Trilobite Bed, within the larger Frankfort shale in the state of New York. A single species is known, Lomankus edgecombei, which was described by Parry et al., 2024. It is currently placed within the family Leanchoiliidae, within the larger Leanchoilida order, and represents the youngest known member of the group. Members of this family are characterized by the presence of long flagelliform structures on their frontal appendages, which were most likely used for both sensory and raptorial purposes.

Lomankus is significant, as it represents the youngest known definitive megacheiran in the fossil record, as well as the only definitive member of the order from post-Cambrian strata. Although several other genera of post-Cambrian arthropods, including members of the family Enaliktidae, have been proposed as members of megacheira, their placement in the order has been contested by several papers. The discovery of definite megacheirans in Ordovician strata adds more evidence to the theory that the Cambrian–Ordovician extinction event was not as severe as once suggested, and the lack of "Cambrian type organisms" in later Paleozoic strata is instead a result of taphonomic bias. This species is differentiated from other megacheirans due to the seeming lack of long endites on its frontal appendages, which are normally found in leanchoiliids. The endites bearing the flagella are either absent, or at least greatly reduced, so the flagella appear to attach directly to the podomeres of the appendages. This suggests that they performed a sensory role in this species, compared to the raptorial role they filled in other members of the family. Another difference is the apparent lack of eyes, which contrasts with the well developed eyes usually seen in other leanchoiliids. This species also possesses an extremely elongated flagelliform structure on its telson, the longest of any known megacheiran. Lomankus most likely lived as a deposit feeder, as the environment it inhabited is thought to have been dysaerobic (lacking in dissolved oxygen).

== Background ==
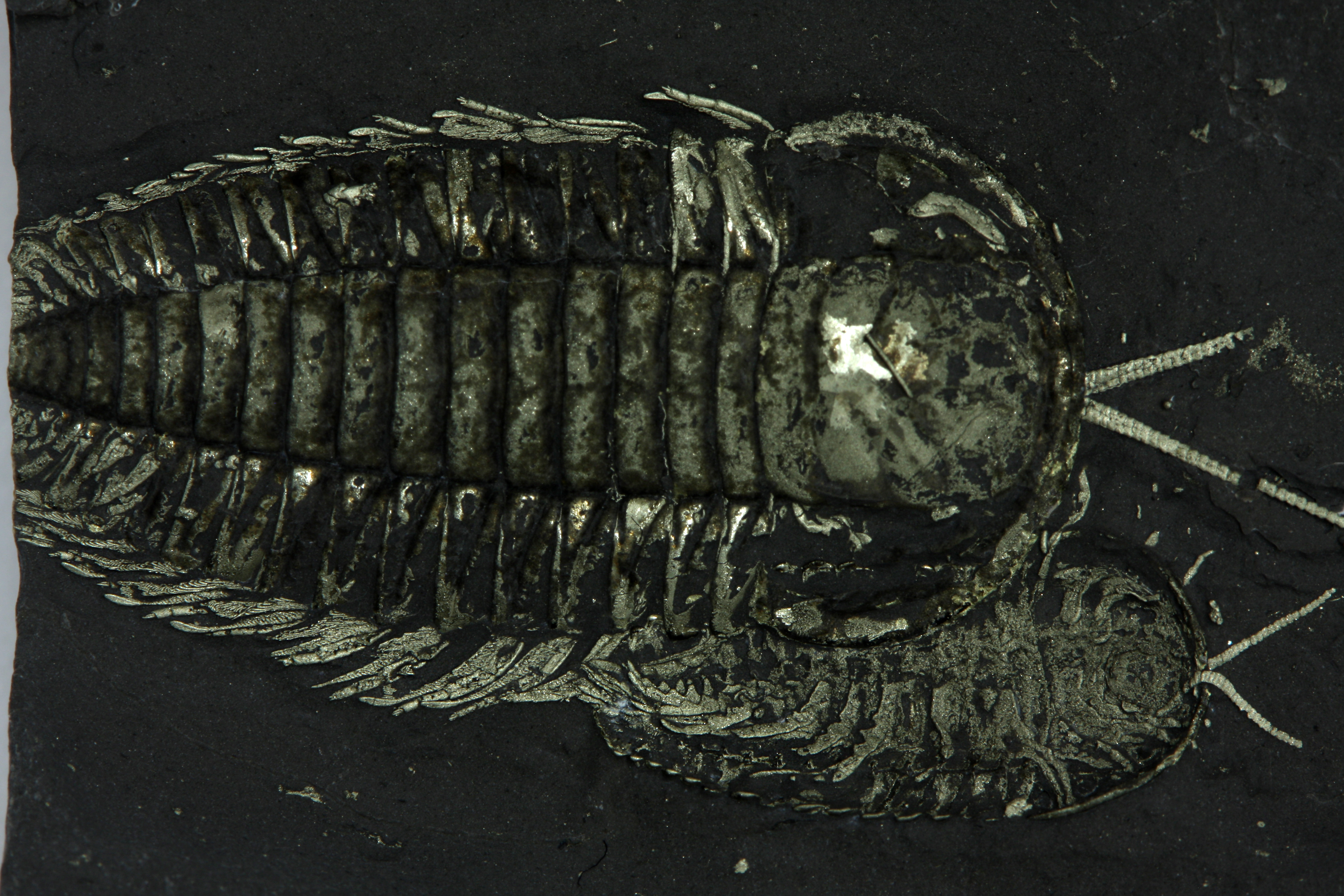
A fossil specimen of the trilobite Triarthrus eatoni from Beecher's Beds, showing the site's characteristic pyritic preservation style.

Located within Oneida County, New York, and the larger Frankfort Shale, Beecher's Trilobite Bed is a Konservat-Lagerstätten fossil site that dates to the Katian stage of the upper Ordovician. Originally discovered in 1892, the site was lost when Charles Emerson Beecher, who discovered it, died in 1904. Afterwards, the majority of research conducted on the trilobite bed was done on previously excavated specimens housed within public collections. However, the trilobite bed was later rediscovered by fossil collectors Tom E. Whiteley (who also helped rediscover the Walcott–Rust quarry) and Dan Cooper in 1984, and has since been protected by the Yale Peabody Museum. The site itself exists within a small quarry located in Cleveland's Glen, and is found in between fine grained turbidite beds, and on top of mudstone layers containing fossilized burrows. The rock layers that contain the fossils are around 40 mm (4 cm) thick, and were most likely deposited via strong currents due to the common alignment that the majority of the fossils from the beds show. The beds are composed of high levels of iron, as well as low concentrations of organic carbon and sulfur. Beecher's Beds are most well known for its exceptional mode of preservation, where soft body parts are replaced by pyrite, giving the fossils a shiny, gold-like appearance. Another notable quality of the site are the hundreds of well preserved remains of various trilobite genera, which preserve the rare appendages (antennae, briamous limbs, etc) that are not normally preserved. However, other groups of organisms, including graptolites, brachiopods, nautiloids, ostracods and various unnamed genera are also known as well.

== Discovery and etymology ==
The fossil specimens belonging to Lomankus were discovered relatively recently from excavations in Beecher's Beds following a large scale excavation in 2004. This discovery shows that Beecher's Beds still hold a number of undiscovered remains, even after the various expeditions that took place after the site was rediscovered. This genus was properly described by Parry et al., 2024, who analyzed five specimens from the Yale Peabody Museum. The holotype specimen of Lomankus, cataloged as YPM IP 256612, is a ventral-oriented fossil showing the underside of the megacheiran. Other specimens, including YPM IP 236743 and YPM IP 516237 preserve the arthropod in a lateral view.

The arthropods genus name, Lomankus, is derived from the Greek words loma, meaning "edge", and ankos, meaning "valley"., referencing Gregory Edgecombe, who has helped greatly in the furthering the understanding of arthropod evolution. The species name, edgecombei, is also in honour of Edgecombe, making the full translation of the scientific name "Edgecombe's edgecombe".

== Description ==
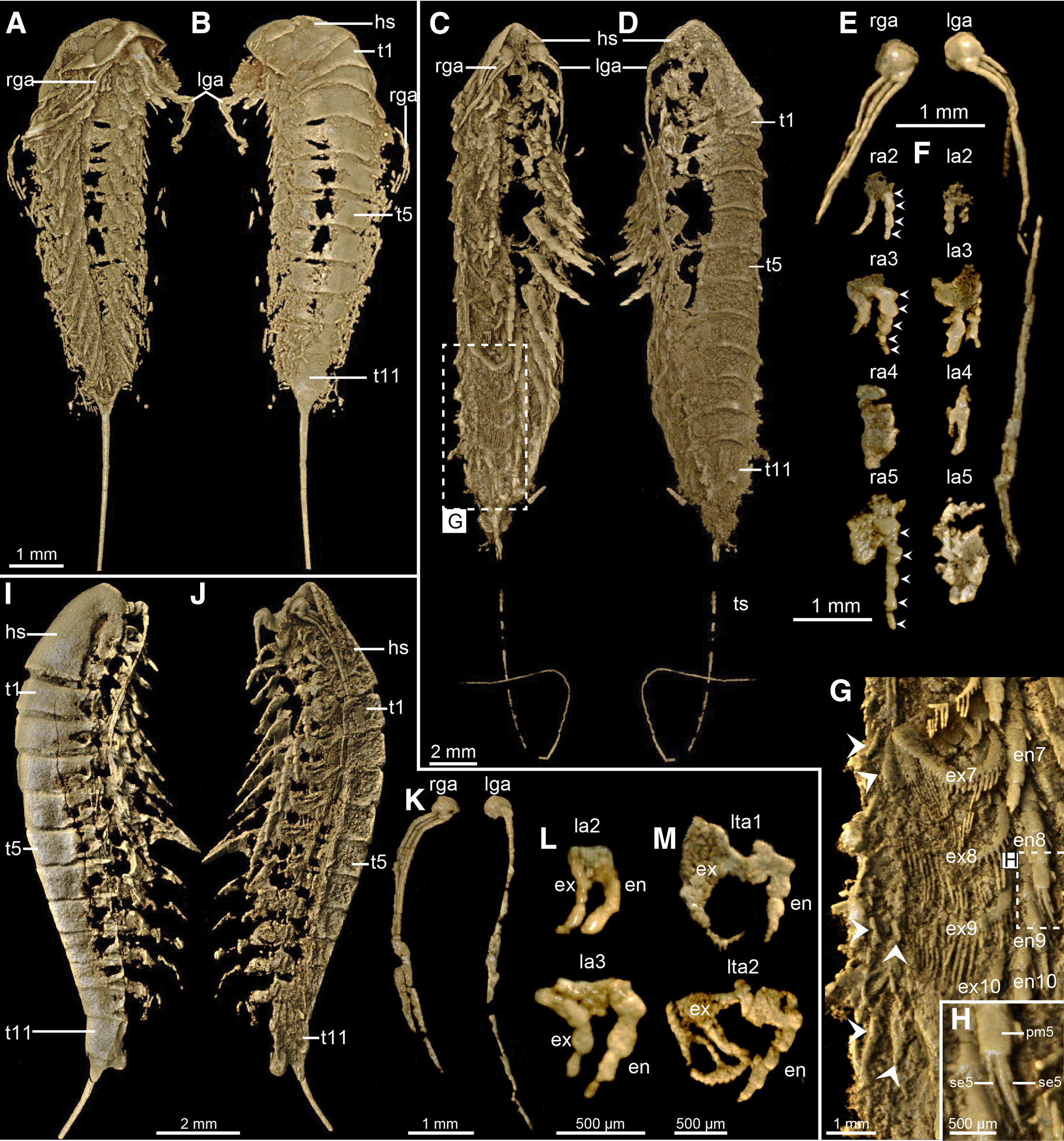
Multiple specimens of L. edgecombei photographed using RTI imagery.

Lomankus was a relativity small arthropod, with a body length of around 8–20 mm (0.8–2 cm) long, excluding the terminal flagella. The cephalic region was almost triangular in appearance, and bore a pair of frontal appendages, as well as 4 pairs of briamous appendages. An ocular region is present on the cephalon, but lacks any evidence of eyes being present. It also possessed a well developed ventral plate that sat anterior to the arthropods mouth, and represents the first leanchoiliid known with this feature. The frontal appendages appear to lack endites of any kind, with the long flagella appearing to attach directly to the podomeres. This contrasts with the long endites usually seen in other leanchoiliids, including Yawunik kootenayi and Leanchoilia superlata. There are at least three main flagella bearing podomeres, with the first one being the largest, and the others experiencing a dramatic decrease in size and width. The other four pairs of cephalic appendages are smaller than those on the trunk region, and consist of at most four podomeres, multiple pairs of rami, as well as paddle-shaped exopods that bore copious amounts of lamellae and setae. The trunk region of this megacheiran is composed of around 11 distinct tergites, that gradually decrease in both width and length, and seem to have no defined pleurae. The trunk appendages also decrease in size gradually, and are composed of around five distinct podomeres, a terminal claw, and exopods that increase in size before gradually decreasing by the fourth appendage. The telson is elongate, and triangular in shape, and ends in an extremely elongated flagelliform structure that exceeded the arthropods whole body length. This heavily contrasts with the majority of other megacheirans, which typically have a small telson with copious amounts of spines. The only other described megacheiran known with a similar structure is the distantly related Tanglangia longicaudata, but the telson of that species is not as flexible as the one possessed by L. edgecombei.

== Classification and significance ==
Cladogram of Chelicerata including Megacheira after Parry et al. 2024:

- Pan‑Chelicerata
  - - †Habelia
    - - †Mollisonia
      - - Xiphosura (horseshoe crabs)
        - - †Dibasterium
          - †Offacolus
  - Megacheira
    - - †Haikoucaris
      - Leanchoiliidae
        - †Oestokerkus
        - - †Yawunik
          - †Alalcomenaeus
        - - †Lomankus
          - †Leanchoilia
    - - - †Tanglangia
        - †Yohoia
      - Jianfengiidae
        - †Fortiforceps
        - - †Sklerolibyon
          - †Jianfengia

Lomankus belongs to an order of arthropods known as the Megacheira, more specifically the family Leanchoiliidae. Megacheirans are often colloquially known as "great appendage arthropods", due to the pair of large frontal appendages and endites possessed by the majority of the species. The frontal appendages of this group show a great deal of morphological diversity, with claw-like endites, and whip-like flagella being found in various genera. Despite being known for more than a century, the Megacheira were only recognized as a distinct group as recently as the late 1990s. Their taxonomic placement has remained a contentious point of discussion, with some studies classifying them as either stem-group chelicerates, or stem-group deuteropods. Parry et al., 2024 conducted multiple phylogenetic analyses on Lomankus, and favored their bayesian analyses, which found that it occupied a relatively derived position within the group, with most of the analyses performed suggesting it to be a sister taxon to Leanchoilia.

The discovery of Lomankus not only extends the temporal range of the Megacheira into the upper Ordovician, but also adds more evidence to the theory that the Cambrian–Ordovician extinction event was not as severe as once suggested, and the lack of "Cambrian type organisms" in later Paleozoic strata is instead a result of taphonomic bias. Although several other post-Cambrian arthropods, including Enalikter aphson and Bundenbachiellus giganteus, have been suggested to represent late surviving megacheirans, this placement has been contested by other studies. Because of this Lomankus represents the youngest definitive megacheiran so far described, and its unique anatomy helps show how the group evolved into the Ordovician.

== Paleobiology and paleoecology ==
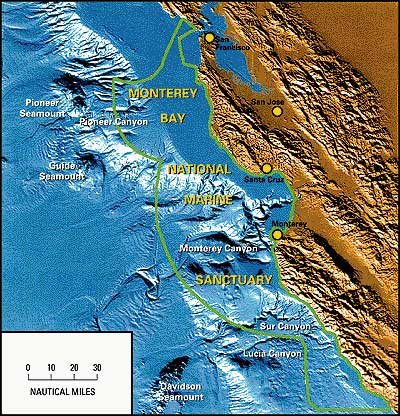
The Beecher's Trilobite Bed has been compared to the deep water basins found off the coast of California.

Lomankus possesses several unique traits compared to other megacheirans, including a terminal flagella, lack of eyes, and more greatly reduced endites and frontal appendages. Because of this, this taxon probably lived a more different lifestyle compared to its Cambrian relatives. Parry et al., 2024 suggests that this megacheiran most likely occupied a deposit feeding niche (feeding on dead, or decaying organic matter), and that the flagella on its frontal appendages most likely were used as sensory structures, compared to the raptorial nature they filled in other taxa. This indicates that megacheirans most likely diversified into other ecological niches following the transition from the Cambrian to the Ordovician, similarly to other groups like the radiodonts.

The ecosystem of the Beecher's Trilobite bed most likely inhabited very deep water, and has been compared to the various deep water faunas inhabiting enclosed basins off the coast of southern California. The depth of the area is indicated by the presence of other blind animals, including the trilobite Cryptolithus, and the majority of the other taxa known occupying deposit and suspension feeding niches. The presence of turbidite beds in the surrounding sediments also adds evidence to this theory, as they are often deposited in deep water areas. The main source of food in the ecosystem would've been marine snow, and other various organic material floating downward from shallower areas. The environment would've also been dysaerobic, which may have aided in killing the organisms before they were buried by sediments via turbidity currents. The contemporary fauna included various trilobites, graptolites, brachiopods, nautiloids, ostracods, poriferans, bryozoans, annelids, phyllocarids, bivalves, and echinoderms.
