= Beecher's Trilobite Bed =

Paleontological site in New York, United States

- Stratigraphic range: Late Ordovician (Caradoc); 445 Ma
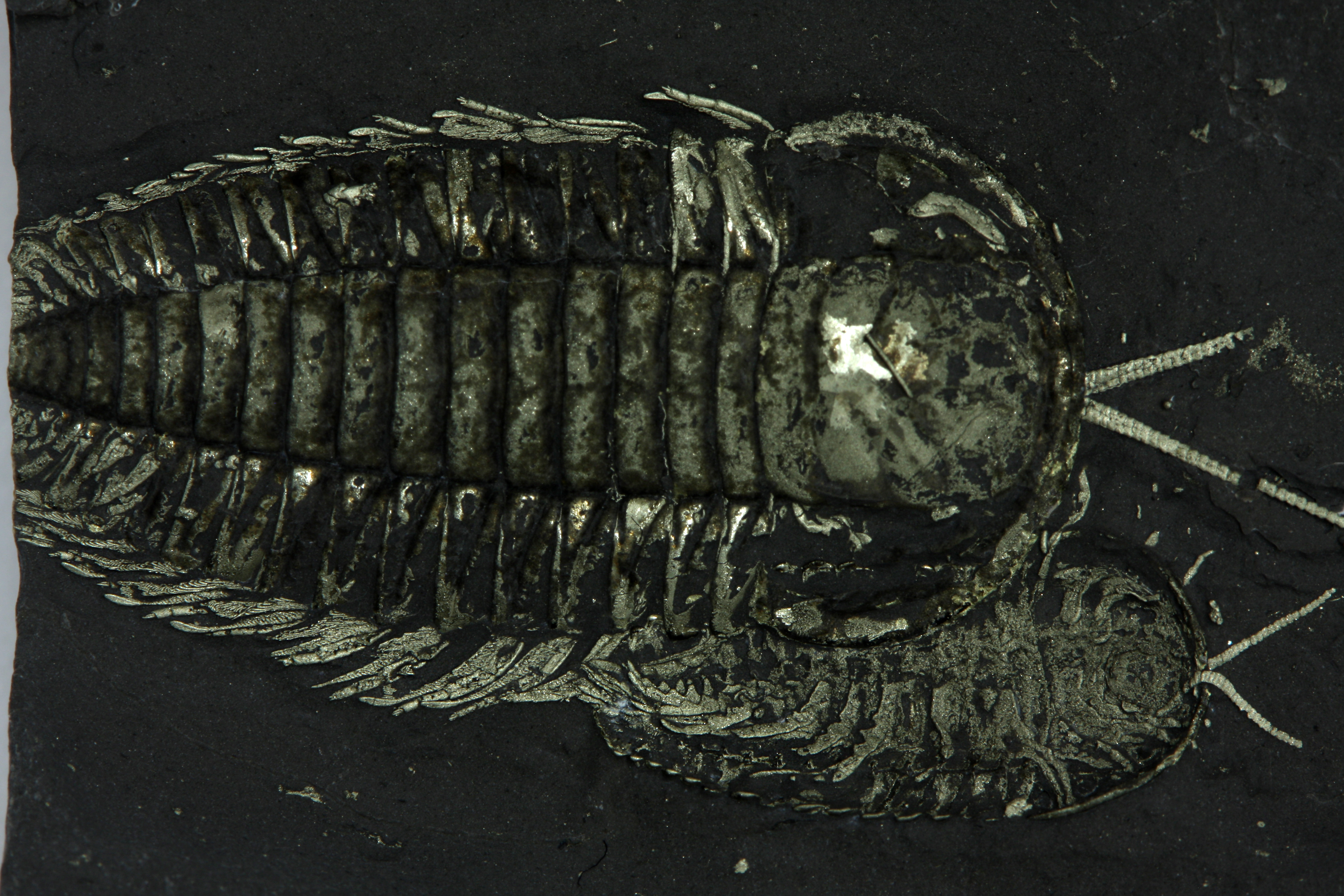
- Two Triarthrus eatoni specimens displaying soft tissue preservation as a result of replacement with pyrite
- Type: Bed
- Unit of: Frankfort Formation
- Area: Small quarry only
- Thickness: 3–4 cm (1.2–1.6 in)

Lithology
- Primary: Shale

Location
- Region: Oneida Co., New York
- Country: United States
- Extent: Very limited

Type section
- Named for: Charles Emerson Beecher

Beecher's Trilobite Bed is a Konservat-Lagerstätte of Late Ordovician (Caradoc) age located within the Frankfort Shale in Cleveland's Glen, Oneida County, New York, USA. Only 3–4 centimeters thick, Beecher's Trilobite Bed has yielded numerous exceptionally preserved trilobites with the ventral anatomy and soft tissue intact, the soft tissue preserved by pyrite replacement. Pyritisation allows the use of X-rays to study fine detail of preserved soft body parts still within the host rock. Pyrite replacement of soft tissue is unusual in the fossil record; the only Lagerstätten thought to show such preservation were Beecher's Trilobite Bed, the Devonian Hunsrück Slates of Germany, and the Jurassic beds of La Voulte-sur-Rhône in France, although new locations are coming to light in New York state.

== History of research ==
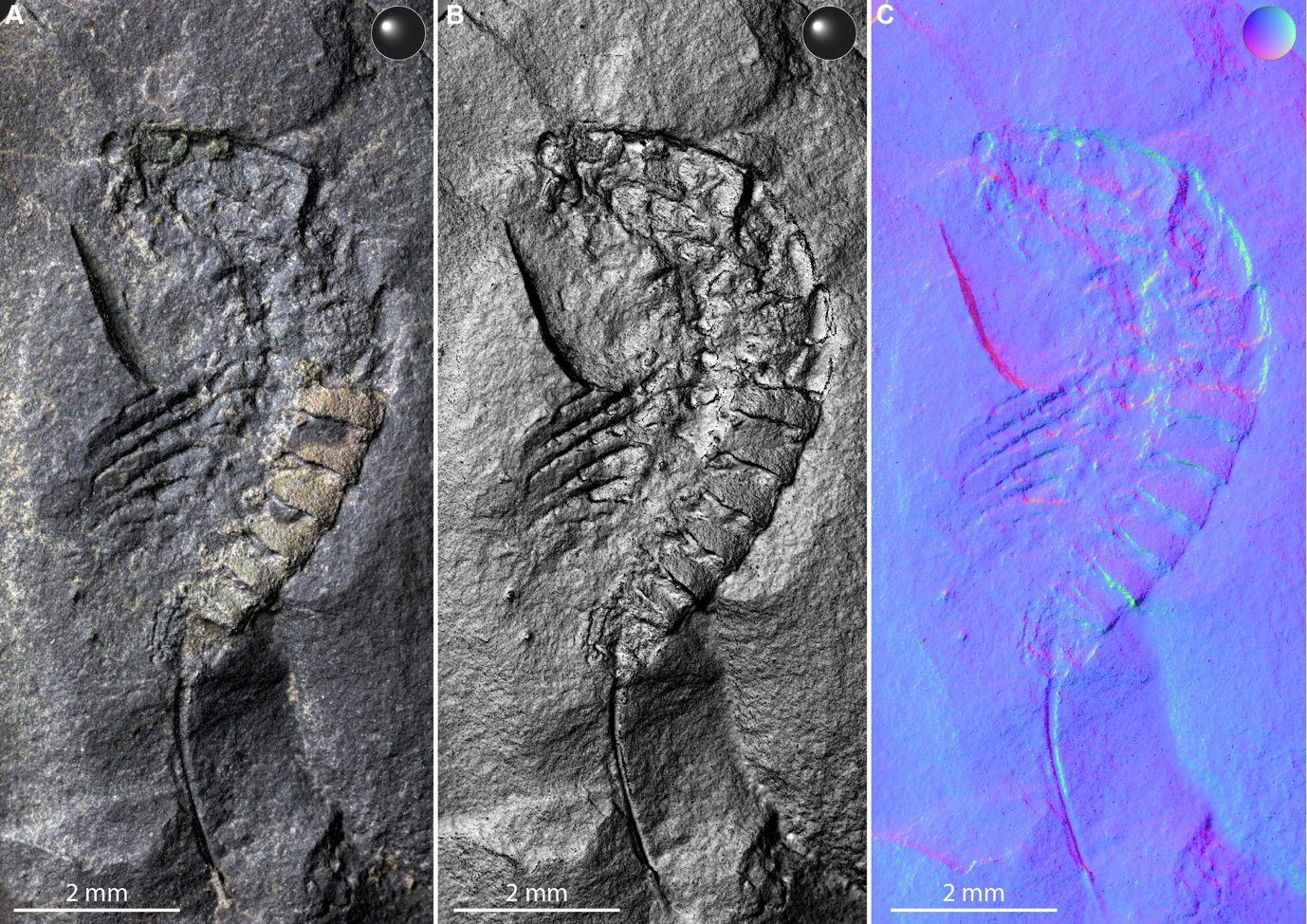
Fossil specimen of the leancholidid arthropod Lomankus edgecombei

Originally discovered in 1892 by William S. Valiant, the site was thoroughly excavated from 1893 to 1895 by Charles Emerson Beecher (after whom the location is named) of Yale University, after which time the location was thought to be exhausted of fossils and excavations ceased. Beecher published three papers describing a trilobite larval form, trilobite limbs and trilobite ventral anatomy from material collected from the site he established. Beecher died unexpectedly in 1904; much material, as well as details of the location, was lost. Research was subsequently limited to study of material collected during the original excavations that had been distributed to various institutions.

Amateur fossil collectors Tom E. Whiteley (also responsible for rediscovering the Walcott-Rust quarry) and Dan Cooper rediscovered the location in 1984 and from 1985 academic excavations and studies (re)-commenced. At least 4 other fossil-bearing horizons exhibiting similar preservation have subsequently been found at the original site. The small quarry at the site is currently closed to public access, being on private land and administered by Yale Peabody Museum as part of ongoing research projects.

== Sedimentology, environment of deposition and preservation ==
The original Beecher's Trilobite Bed is found within a thick succession of fine grained turbidite beds, the fossiliferous bed is about 40 mm thick lying on a scoured mudstone surface with remnants of burrows. Well preserved fossil remains are found 7–10 mm above the base parallel to the bedding plane, strongly aligned by the current, with as many facing up as down. Chemically, the bed contains high iron coupled with low organic carbon and low organic sulfur.

The ecosystem of the Beecher's Trilobite bed most likely inhabited very deep water, and has been compared to the various deep water faunas inhabiting enclosed basins off the coast of southern California. The depth of the area is indicated by the presence of blind animals, including the trilobite Cryptolithus, and the majority of the other taxa known occupying deposit and suspension feeding niches. The presence of turbidite beds in the surrounding sediments also adds evidence to this theory, as they are often deposited in deep water areas. The main source of food in the ecosystem would've been marine snow, and other various organic material floating downward from shallower areas. The environment would've also been dysaerobic, which may have aided in killing the organisms before they were buried by sediments via turbidity currents.

== Fauna ==
The fauna of the site included various trilobites, megacheirans, graptolites, brachiopods, nautiloids, ostracods, poriferans, bryozoans, annelids, phyllocarids, bivalves, and echinoderms. The trilobite Triarthrus eatoni comprises 85% of the organisms sampled at the locality, other notable taxa include graptolites, branching algae, brachiopods and problematica (incertae sedis). The trilobites Cryptolithus bellulus (Ulrich), Cornuproetus beecheri (Ruedeman), Primaspis crosotus (Locke) are also recorded. In addition, the megacheiran Lomankus is known from the site.

== See also ==
- Beecher's Trilobite type preservation, the preservational pathway responsible
- Walcott-Rust Quarry, a nearby locality known for its unique preservation of trilobites
