= Beecher's Trilobite type preservation =

Replacement of soft tissues of a fossil with pyrite

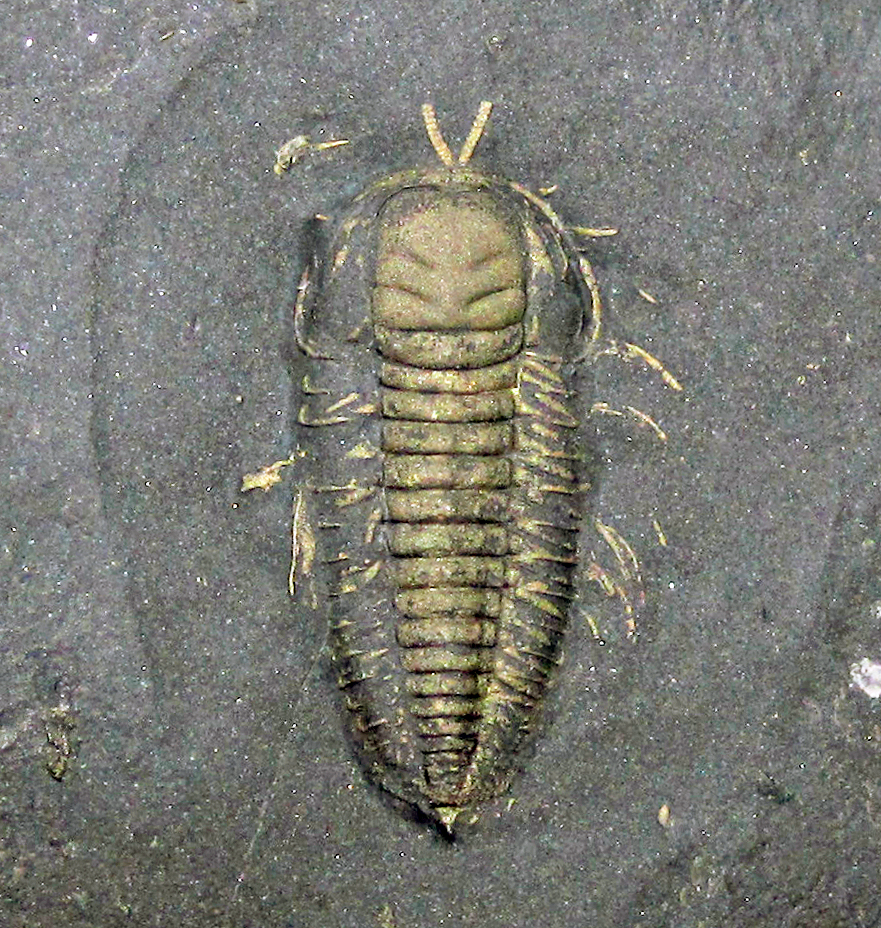
A Triarthrus eatoni with preserved appendages. From upper New York, United States

The preservational regime of Beecher's Trilobite Bed (Upper Ordovician) and other similar localities involves the replacement of soft tissues with pyrite, producing a three-dimensional fossil replicating the anatomy of the original organism. Only gross morphological information is preserved (unlike Orsten type phosphate replacement), although the fossils are compressed some relief is preserved (unlike Burgess Shale type preservation).

The pyrite formed in voids left when soft tissue had decayed, and the tough exoskeleton formed a cavity which could be filled by euhedral pyrite. Pyrite replacement of soft tissue can only occur in exceptional circumstances of sediment chemistry when there is a low organic content, but a high concentration of dissolved iron.

When a carcass is buried in such sediment, sulfate-reducing anaerobic bacteria break down its organic matter producing sulfide. The high concentration of iron in the sediment converts this to iron mono-sulfide. Finally, aerobic bacteria convert this by oxidation to pyrite. The requirement of early anaerobic and later aerobic bacteria means that the pyritisation must occur in the upper levels of the sediment, close to the aerobic-anaerobic interface. If the organic content of the sediment is too high the dissolved iron precipitates in the sediment and not in the carcass. Seawater sulfate ions diffusing toward animal carcasses enabled sulfate-reducing bacteria to oxidize the reactive organic matter of these remains, but the sulfide produced reacted promptly with the abundant Fe^{2+} ions of the pore water and pyrite precipitated right on the organic remains.
