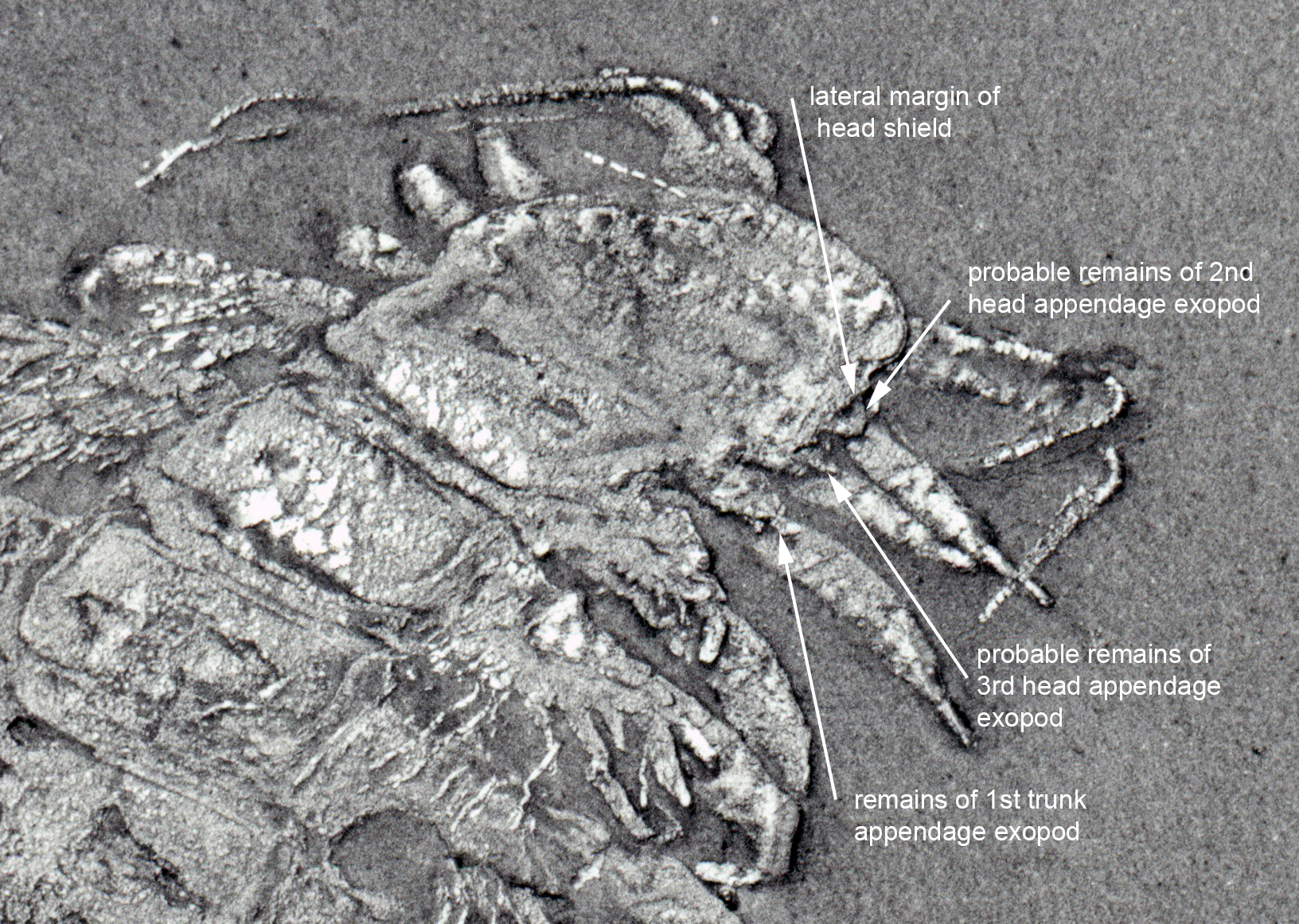
- Anterior area of B. giganteus (specimen NM PWL 1997/3-LS)

Scientific classification
- Kingdom: Animalia
- Phylum: Arthropoda
- Class: †Megacheira (?)
- Family: †Enaliktidae
- Genus: †Bundenbachiellus; Broili, 1930
- Species: †B. giganteus

Binomial name
- †Bundenbachiellus giganteus (Broili, 1929)

Synonyms
- Megadactylus giganteus Broili, 1929; Eschenbachiellus wuttkensi Briggs & Bartels, 2001

= Bundenbachiellus =

Bundenbachiellus Temporal range: Emsian

Extinct arthropod genus

Bundenbachiellus is an extinct genus of arthropod described from the Lower Devonian Hunsrück Slate of Germany. This genus is known from only one species, B. giganteus. Alongside its possible relative Enalikter from Silurian, it is possible that genus is late-living example of Megacheira, "great-appendage arthropod".

== History ==
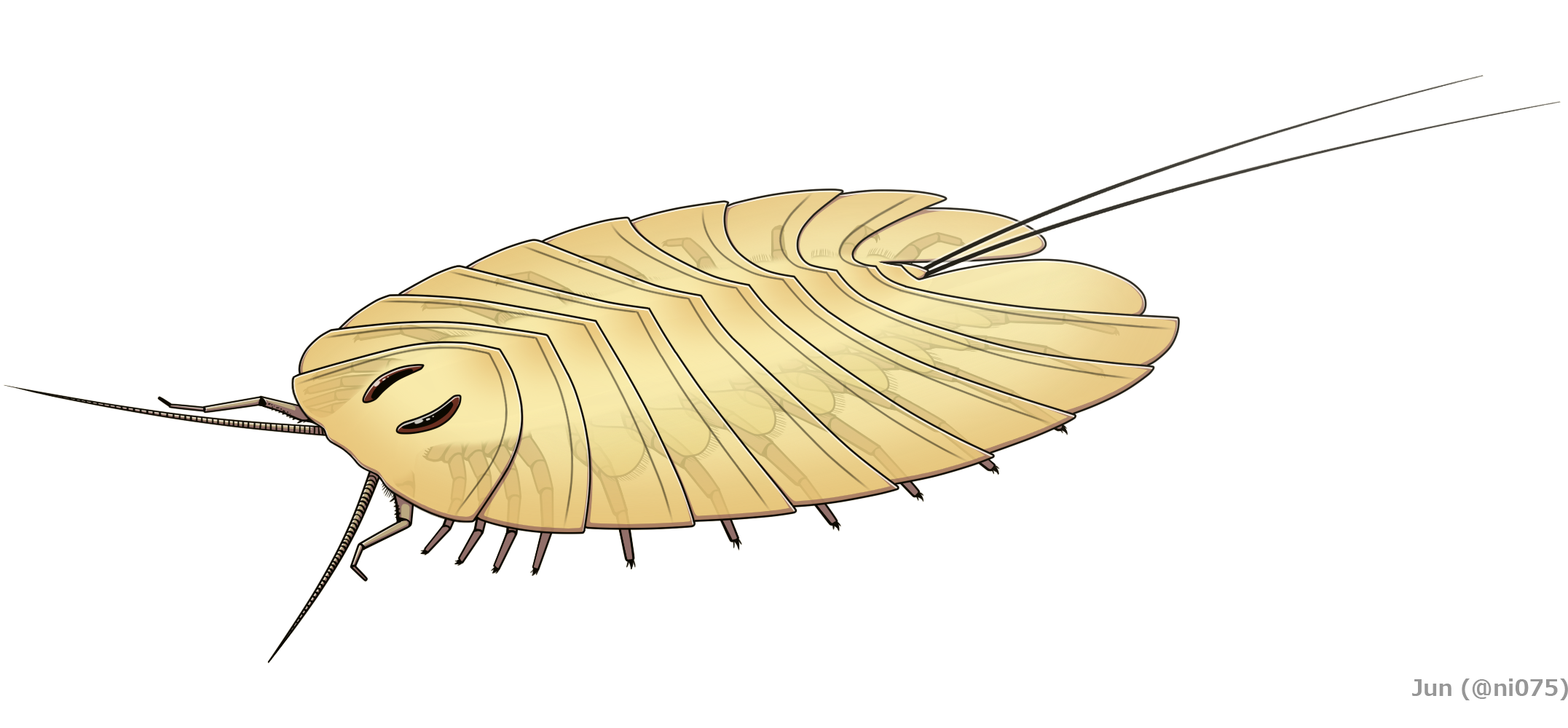
Cheloniellon, arthropod that is once considered as synonymous with Bundenbachiellus

Bundenbachiellus giganteus was described in 1929 with the name of Megadactylus giganteus, with incomplete specimen BSPG 1929 II 34, however genus name Megadactylus was already used for synonym of dinosaur Anchisaurus, its genus name was changed into Bundenbachiellus in 1930. Second species, B. minor was also described, however that species is later considered as misinterpretation of a trilobite. Due to holotype specimen was incomplete, preserved without anterior section, Bundenbachiellus was once treated as partial fossil of cheloniellid arthropod Cheloniellon calmani, and taxon itself as synonym of Cheloniellon. In 2001, new taxon Eschenbachiellus wuttkensis was described from complete specimen NM PWL 1997/3-LS, along with other three species of arthropod such as enigmatic Wingertshellicus backesi. However, in 2008 researchers found that Eschenbachiellus is complete specimen of Bundenbachiellus, and it was completely different from Cheloniellon. Taxon Bundenbachiellus giganteus was reassessed, and Eschenbachiellus is considered as junior synonym of Bundenbachiellus.

== Morphology ==
Bundenbachiellus is large arthropod, although complete specimen NM PWL 1997/3-LS is just 6.3 cm (2.5 in) long, incomplete holotype specimen BSPG 1929 II 34 is estimated to have a length up to 22.8 cm (9.0 in). Its cephalon have semicircular head shield, a uniramous and a long biramous antenna and three pairs of appendages, and lacked eyes. Trunk have 11 segments with tergites connected by a short ridged area, and each segment have a pair of biramous appendages. On the end of the body, a segment without biramous appendages can be seen and it bears a pair of dorsal spines, and this segment is possibly a telson. Comparing morphology with its possible relative Enalikter, some characters can be reinterpreted. Biramous antenna and first pair of appendages represent a single triflagellate limb. Other two pairs of appendages on cephalon are probably biramous. Appendages that originally considered to belong to cephalon is possible to be first pair of trunk appendages, making Bundenbachiellus had 12 pairs of trunk appendages same as these of Enalikter.

== Classification ==
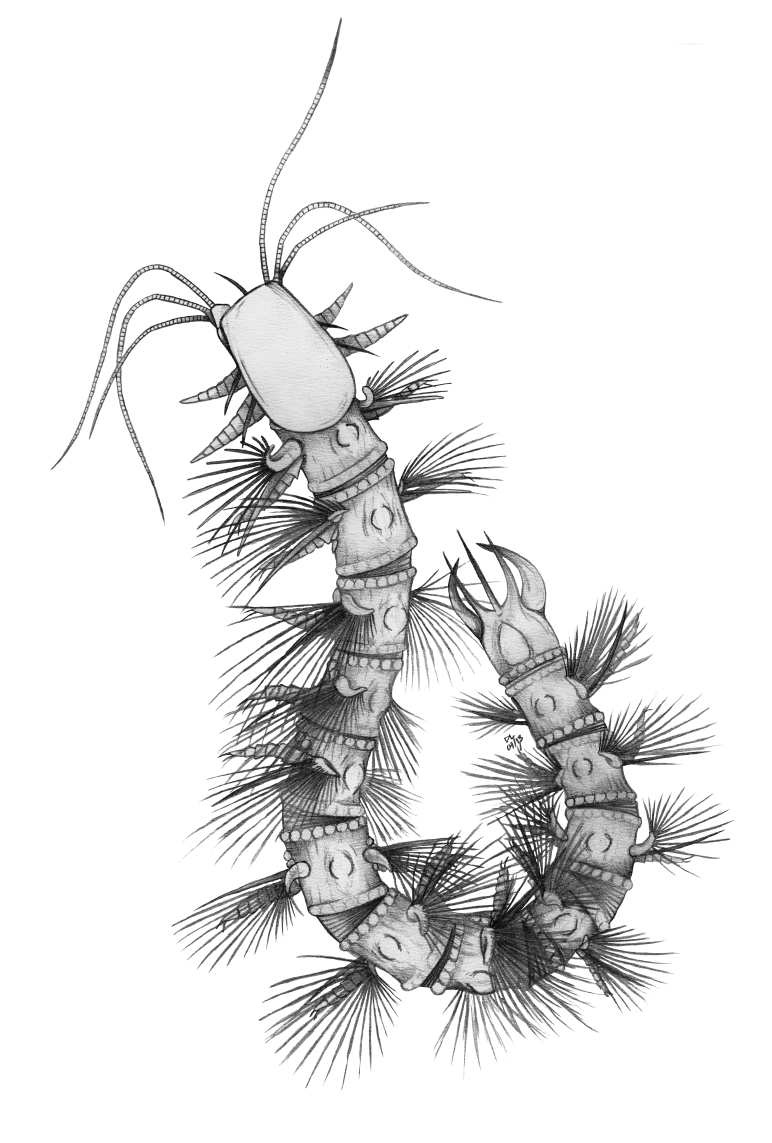
Reconstruction of Enalikter, arthropod possibly related to Bundenbachiellus

Studies in 2001 and 2008 placed Bundenbachiellus in "Crustaceanomorpha", and possibly a stem crustacean as opposed to a stem arachnomorph. However, in 2014, new genus of arthropod, Enalikter has described from Silurian Herefordshire Lagerstätte, and it shared morphological similarities with Bundenbachiellus although there are some different characters. That study considered that these taxa fall in a clade of short-great-appendage arthropods, Megacheira. Alongside Enalikter, Bundenbachiellus is included in the family Enaliktidae, and probably they are members of the stem clade Leanchoiliida. Its affinity as megacheiran is questioned in subsequent study, still Enalikter and Bundenbachiellus should be considered of potential importance to clarify the position of Oelandocaris, taxon with questioned characteristics both for stem-crustaceans and megacheiran.
