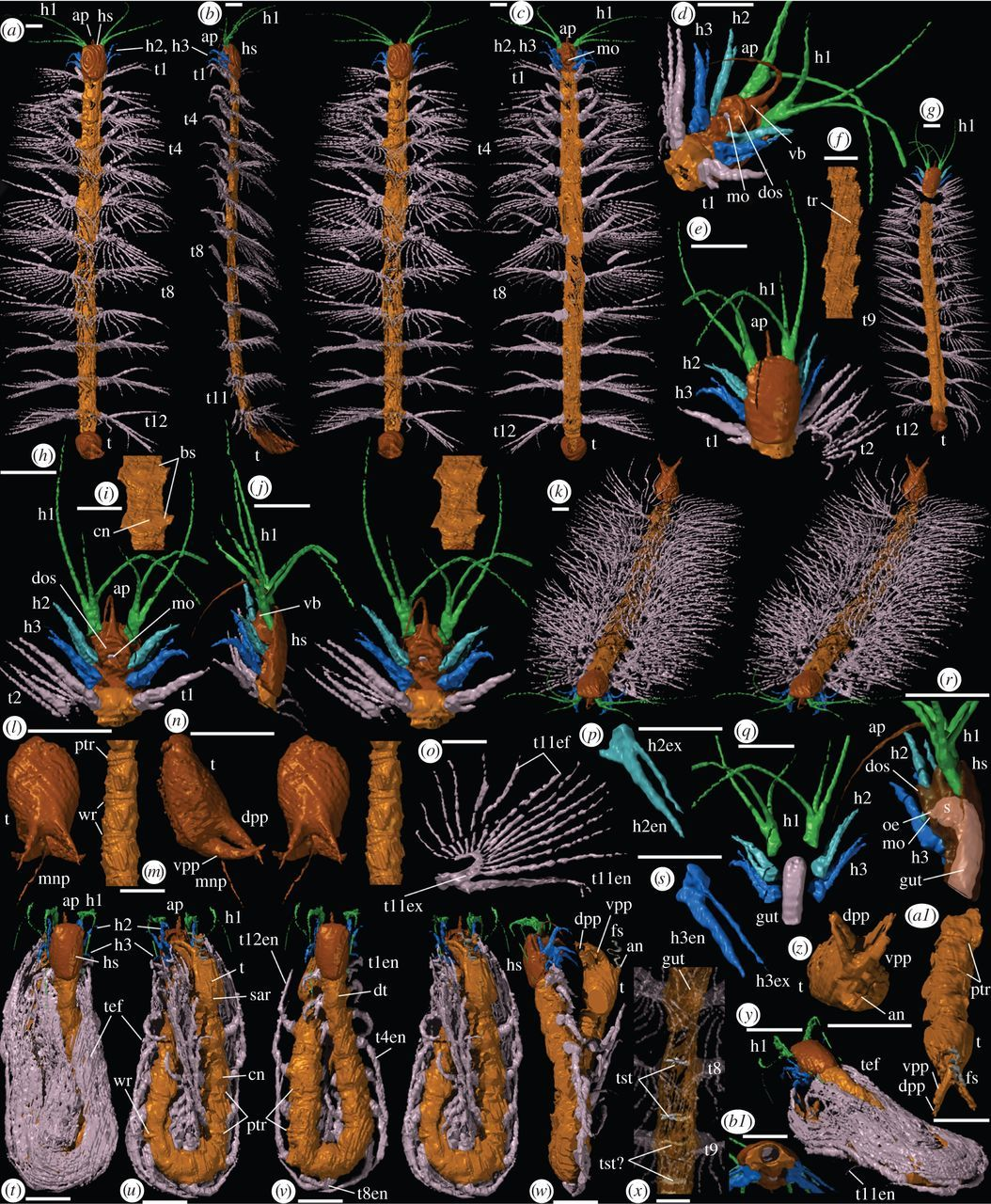
- Virtual reconstructions of Enalikter

Scientific classification
- Kingdom: Animalia
- Phylum: Arthropoda
- Class: †Megacheira (?)
- Family: †Enaliktidae; Siveter, Briggs, Siveter, Sutton, Legg & Joomun, 2014

Genera
- †Bundenbachiellus Broili, 1929; †Enalikter Siveter et al., 2014

= Enaliktidae =

Enaliktidae Temporal range: Homerian–Emsian

Extinct family of arthropods

Enaliktidae is an extinct family of elongate arthropods known from the Silurian and Devonian periods, containing two genera, Enalikter and Bundenbachiellus. The taxonomic position of the family is uncertain. In its original description it was attributed to the Megacheira, a group of arthropods otherwise known from the Cambrian and Ordovician periods, due to them possessing uniramous frontal appendages with whip-like extensions, similar to the great appendages of megacheirans belonging to the family Leanchoiliidae like Leanchoilia. However, their placement as megacheirans has been questioned, as they arguably lack any defining apomorphies of that group, as whether the great appendages of megacheirans and the frontal appendages of enaliktids are homologous is unclear.
