= Charles Emerson Beecher =

American paleontologist (1856–1904)

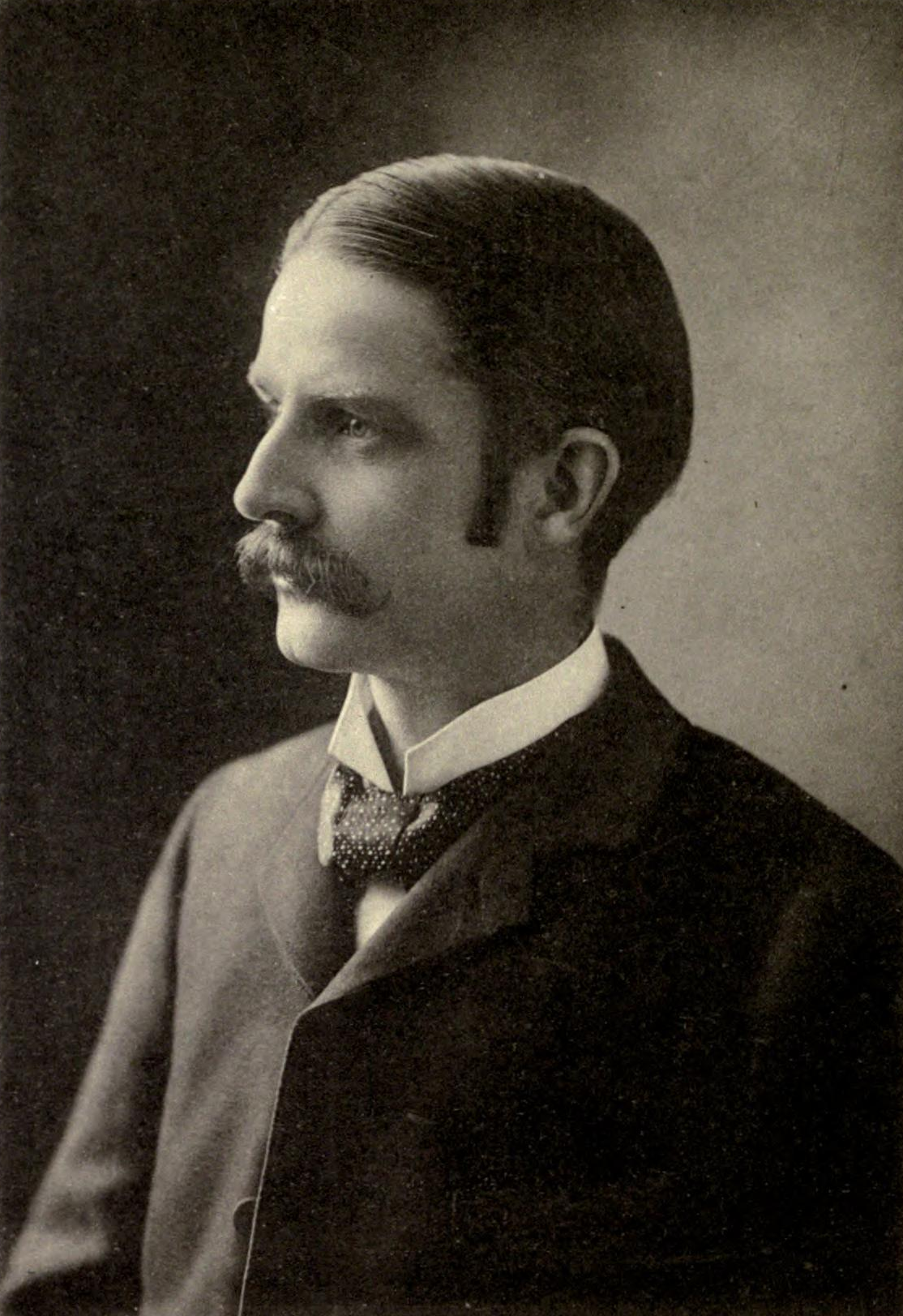
- Born: October 9, 1856; Dunkirk, New York
- Died: February 14, 1904 (aged 47)
- Citizenship: American
- Education: University of Michigan; Yale University
- Known for: Invertebrate paleontology, Trilobite anatomy
- Scientific career
- Fields: Paleontologist
- Workplaces: Yale Peabody Museum
- Doctoral advisor: Othniel Charles Marsh

Signature
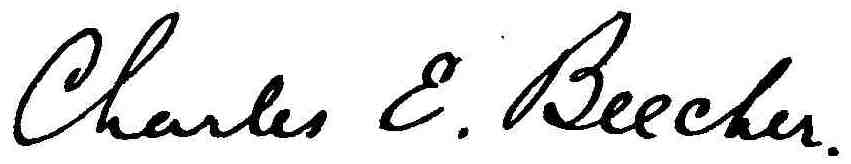

Charles Emerson Beecher (October 9, 1856 – February 14, 1904) was an American paleontologist most famous for the thorough excavation, preparation and study of trilobite ventral anatomy from specimens collected at Beecher's Trilobite Bed. Beecher was rapidly promoted at Yale Peabody Museum, eventually rising to head that institution.

== Early life ==
Charles Emerson Beecher, the son of Moses and Emily Emerson Beecher, was born in Dunkirk, New York, on October 9, 1856. In early childhood Beecher's family moved to Warren, Pennsylvania, where he attended private and high schools.

A born naturalist and collector, Beecher began collecting fossils from the Chemung and Waverly Formations about Warren, resulting in an extensive collection of fossil Phyllocarids and freshwater Unionids presented to the New York State Museum in Albany in 1886 and 1887. 20,000 specimens (40,000 if duplicates are included), largely collected by Beecher himself, were present, including at least 121 species of land and fresh-water Mollusca. 102 localities are represented, seventy of which are in New York State, the others being in various parts of the United States, especially Warren, Pennsylvania and Michigan.

Beecher received an undergraduate degree (B.S.) from University of Michigan in 1878.

== Academic life ==
Following graduation, Beecher worked for 10 years as personal assistant to the difficult, but highly influential James Hall (who also counted Fielding Meek, Charles Walcott and Josiah Whitney among his assistants) the State Geologist of New York. Working with Hall provided a strong background in systematic paleontology and allowed Beecher to further improve his fossil preparation and photography skills. Beecher is credited in many of Hall's publications for his fossil preparation, photographic and systematic contributions.

In 1888, at the request of then Curator of the Geological Collections Othniel Charles Marsh, Beecher moved to New Haven, Connecticut, to oversee the Yale Peabody Museum's growing collection of invertebrate fossils. In 1891 he was Instructor for Paleontology at Sheffield Scientific School (SSS) and took the geology course for James Dwight Dana, who was ill.

Beecher was awarded his doctorate for his study on Brachiospongidae (enigmatic Silurian sponges) in 1891. In 1892 Beecher renewed his working relationship with Charles Schuchert (who had also worked with Hall) preparing slabs of Crawfordsville crinoids for the 'Chicago Exposition'. Remarkable preparations of brachiopods, trilobites, Crawfordsville crinoids and Uintacrinus specimens for exhibition at Yale Peabody Museum were especially noteworthy and pay tribute to Beecher's exceptional skills as a fossil preparator.

Beecher was first to thoroughly excavate a thin shale deposit now known as Beecher's Trilobite Bed. Pyrite preservation of soft body parts at this site is geologically rare, leading to its later recognition as a Konservat-Lagerstätten. In 1893, Beecher began publishing work on trilobite anatomy and classification, using specialized preparation techniques the reveal ventral appendages, including antennae and legs, that had not been preserved in previously known specimens.

Beecher's bachelor days at New Haven (where he roomed in "the attic," the top story of the SSS with Louis Valentine Pirsson, Samuel Lewis Penfield & Horace Lemuel Wells) came to an end on September 12, 1894, when he married Miss Mary Salome Galligan.

Beecher was a leading proponent of Neo-Lamarckism (epitomized by Edward Drinker Cope and Alpheus Hyatt) and also argued for orthogenesis and racial senescence.

"...[Beecher] became the leader of the Hyatt School. Beecher's reputation as an investigator will rest chiefly on the rich results he obtained in the critical, painstaking application of these fruitful principles that Professor Hyatt labored so long to establish."

— Jackson, 1904, p413

Beecher's promotion path at Yale was rapid. Promoted to Professor of Historical Geology at SSS in 1897 and, on the death of Marsh in 1899, Beecher succeeded him as Curator of the Geological Collections, Yale Peabody Museum. Beecher's title at SSS was later renamed University Professor of Paleontology.

In June 1899, he donated his large personal collection to the Peabody Museum. Representing 20 years of work, the more than 100,000 specimens were all personally collected by Beecher himself. Mostly Devonian and Lower Carboniferous material from New York and Pennsylvania, the donated collection contained about 500 type specimens and also contained hundreds of specimens representing developmental stages, rare species, and exquisitely prepared examples showing structural detail. All specimens were meticulously labeled, named and provenanced.

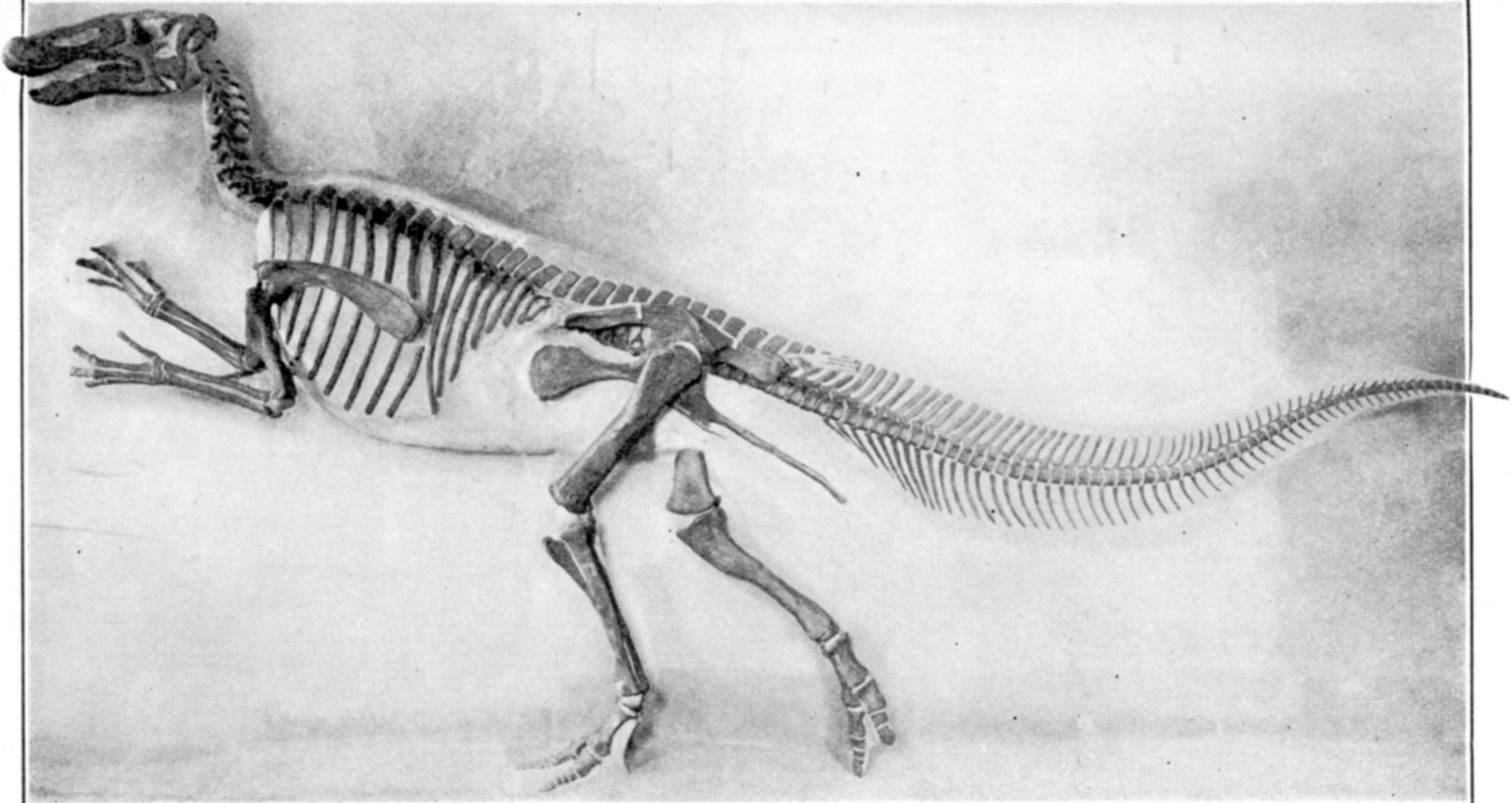
YPM VP 2182

At the same time as the donation, Beecher was made head of the museum following Marsh's death, and was put to mount specimens. The first one he chose was YPM VP 2182, a well-complete and articulate hadrosaur dinosaur identified then as "Claosaurus" annectans but now understood to be Edmontosaurus. The mount serves the first of many things, such as the first nearly complete dinosaur mounted in the US, and the first mounted dinosaur to have its spine horizontal to the ground, rather than be upright and tail-dragging. Beecher recognised from trackways the absence of tail marks, as well as how the ischium of the dinosaur would get in the way of the tail.

Beecher died suddenly of heart disease on February 14, 1904 leaving many of his studies unfinished. Beecher was survived by his wife, two young daughters, mother and brother. Beecher was succeeded by his close friend and colleague Charles Schuchert as Curator of the Geological Collections.

== Impact ==
"His studies... made our knowledge of the Trilobita as a class a new thing, putting them on a basis for proper comparative study with other Crustacea. He also took up studies of the development of Trilobita, describing the development in genera in which it was previously unknown or partially known."

— Jackson, 1904, p414

Although Beecher is most noted for his seminal work on trilobites he is also regarded for his work on corals and was ultimately regarded as a leading authority on fossil crustacea and brachiopoda and noted for contributions in evolution.

Yale reprinted a collection of some of Beecher's most important papers, Studies in Evolution, as part of their bicentennial in 1901, although a modest Beecher deplored as extravagance the republication of papers already in print. Beecher's bibliography includes some 100+ scientific papers, often brief, describing 7 new orders, 1 new family, 2 new subfamilies, 7 new genera, and 20 new species. An apparently low content of stratigraphic and systematic paleontology publications in his body of work should be offset by his contribution to the work of Hall.

Obituaries published in some of the leading academic journals of the time attest to his professional impact: American Journal of Science; American Geologist; Science; Museum's Journal [London]; Geological Magazine [London]; and American Naturalist. A comprehensive re-examination of exceptionally preserved trilobites published in 1920 was dedicated to Beecher; his contribution was still significant nearly 20 years after his death.

== Career summary ==
- B.S., University of Michigan, 1878
- Assistant to James Hall, New York State Museum, 1878–1888
- Assistant in Paleontology, New York State Museum
- Consulting Paleontologist, New York State Museum
- Assistant, Yale Peabody Museum, 1888–1899
- Ph.D. awarded, Yale University, 1889
- Instructor in Paleontology, Sheffield Scientific School, Yale, 1891–1892
- Assistant Professor of Paleontology, Sheffield Scientific School, Yale, 1892–1897
- Member of the governing board of the Sheffield Scientific School, Yale, 1892
- Professor of Historical Geology, Sheffield Scientific School, Yale, 1897–1902
- Corresponding member of the Boston Society of Natural History, 1898
- Curator of Geological Collections, Yale Peabody Museum, 1899–1904
- Member of the National Academy of Sciences, 1899
- Foreign correspondent of the Geological Society of London, 1899
- Fellow of the Geological Society of America, 1899
- Member of the Board of Trustees, Yale Peabody Museum, 1899
- Secretary of the Board of Trustees, Yale Peabody Museum
- Member of the Executive Committee, Yale Peabody Museum
- President of the Connecticut Academy of Arts and Sciences, 1900–1902
- University Professor of Paleontology, Sheffield Scientific School, Yale, 1902–1904

== See also ==
- Beecher's Trilobite Bed, the trilobite Konservat-Lagerstätten that bears his name
