= Walcott–Rust quarry =

Fossil site in Herkimer County, New York

- Stratigraphic range: Upper Ordovician (Shermanian) 457–454 Ma
- Type: Geological formation
- Unit of: Trenton Group, Rust Formation, Spillway Member
- Area: Small quarry
- Thickness: c. 1 metre

Lithology
- Primary: Micritic limestone
- Other: Shale

Location
- Coordinates: 43°16′38″N 75°8′20″W
- Region: Russia, Herkimer County, New York, USA.
- Country: USA
- Extent: Very limited

Type section
- Named for: Charles Doolittle Walcott & William Rust
- Named by: Brett et al. (1999)

The Walcott–Rust quarry, in Herkimer County, New York, is an excellent example of an obrution (rapid burial or "smothered") Lagerstätte. Unique preservation of trilobite appendages resulted from early consolidation (cementation) of the surrounding rock, followed by spar filling of the interior cavity within the appendages. The presence of so many well preserved trilobites in one location alone qualifies the beds as an exceptional trilobite site, but the beds are further distinguished as the source of the first trilobites for which appendages were definitively described.

== Historical overview ==
By 1860 William Palmer Rust (1826–1897) and his father Hiram were actively excavating fossils from quarries on the family farm originally opened for building stone. 1870 saw Charles Doolittle Walcott working a new trilobite locality in Upper Ordovician limestones on a creek near the Rust farm, where Walcott had recently moved. Walcott and Rust began to quarry the site with Walcott marrying Rust's daughter Laura Ann on January 9, 1872.

In 1873 Walcott and Rust sold their collections to Louis Agassiz at the Museum of Comparative Zoology, Harvard University. At this meeting between Walcott and Agassiz, Walcott mentioned that he had seen evidence of appendages and soft tissue, which Agassiz recommended he pursue. Discovery of soft body preservation at the Walcott–Rust quarry pre-dates Walcott's discovery of the more famous Burgess Shale lagerstätte by 40 years.

Walcott left the area and active working of the quarry in 1876 (his wife Lura Ann died of tuberculosis on January 23, 1876) although he returned for brief periods throughout his career. In 1876/7 Walcott published several papers on trilobite appendages, the first documentation of these features. In 1879 Walcott took up his appointment with the USGS and sold the fossils he and Rust had collected between 1873 and 1879 to Alexander Agassiz at the Museum of Comparative Zoology.

Rust and his friends continued to extract and sell specimens from the quarry until Rust's death in 1897. It is estimated that over the years 8,600 square feet (800 m^{2}) were excavated. The old fossil quarry site was reopened in 1990 by Thomas E. Whiteley (also involved in the rediscovery of Beecher's Trilobite Bed) and extensively re-examined.

== Sedimentology and environment of deposition ==
The Walcott–Rust quarry is excavated into beds of the lower part of the Rust Formation and consist of a distinctive one meter package of generally tabular, fine grained lime mudstone with a few bioturbated beds, part of a series of shallowing upward cycles that commence with dark shales that grade into fine-grained limestones. Many of these thin layers yield evidence for rapid deposition as distal carbonate turbidites or storm layers.

Fossils occur at the bases, tops and within a number of the storm units. Fossils represented in the Walcott–Rust quarry beds reflect a shelf community that developed during times of rather low net sedimentation and minimal bioturbation of the bottom. These communities were episodically smothered by sediment layers re-suspended by storms in shallower water.

== Fossil fauna ==
Exquisitely preserved fossils, including at least 18 species of trilobites, have been documented. The four most common trilobites Ceraurus, Flexicalymene, Isotelus gigas, and Meadowtownella are found (complete or partially complete) throughout the deposit often associated with echinoderms. 22 of the 50 recognized beds were found to yield at least one complete articulated trilobite and/or echinoderm (primarily crinoids). More specifically, the fauna includes brachiopods, bryozoans, 11 described species of crinoids, one paracrinoid, one rhombiferan, two "carpoids", two asteroids, one ophiuroid, and one edrioasteroid.

Walcott–Rust Quarry is the single richest and most varied source of trilobites in the New York Trenton Group limestones and perhaps in the entire suite of New York Paleozoic rocks.

— Brett et al. (1999)

== Taphonomy and exceptional preservation ==
One layer (the "Ceraurus layer") yields specimens that are uniquely preserved with calcified appendages, forming the basis of Walcott's earliest and still classic papers which first documented biramous limbs of trilobites. Trilobites appendages are preserved in specimens of Ceraurus, Flexicalymene, and Meadowtownella uniquely preserved as sparry calcite infilings. Exceptionally fine detail of the appendages was preserved and has undergone very little compaction (a contrast to other sites). This type of preservation is only apparent when a specimen is sliced and the cut surface is polished or a thin section made. Also, only those specimens which are partially enrolled show a significant amount of this type of preservation. For these reasons it is unlikely that this preservation would be obvious to anyone collecting trilobites.

A sequence of events was necessary for this appendage preservation to take place. The trilobites that show the best soft tissue preservation were buried when partially enrolled inside the layer. The burial was in lime sediment and that may have buffered the micro-environment against any acidic products of bacterial metabolism. The surrounding rock must have consolidated very rapidly to allow the three-dimensional preservation. Organic matter made the closed micro-environment anaerobic; decay proceeded by sulfate reducing bacteria producing bicarbonate and sulfide byproducts (Allison, 1990). A slightly alkaline environment, saturated with carbonate, with bicarbonate build-up may have led to highly localized calcium carbonate precipitation. Pyrite formation, more common in such circumstances, may have been inhibited because of the small amount of iron in the carbonate sediment.

== See also ==
- Walcott–Rust quarry summary from Sam Gon III
- Whiteley, Thomas E.; Kloc, Gerald J.; Brett, Carlton E. (2002). Trilobites of New York: an illustrated guide. Cornell University Press. ISBN 978-0-8014-3969-8.
