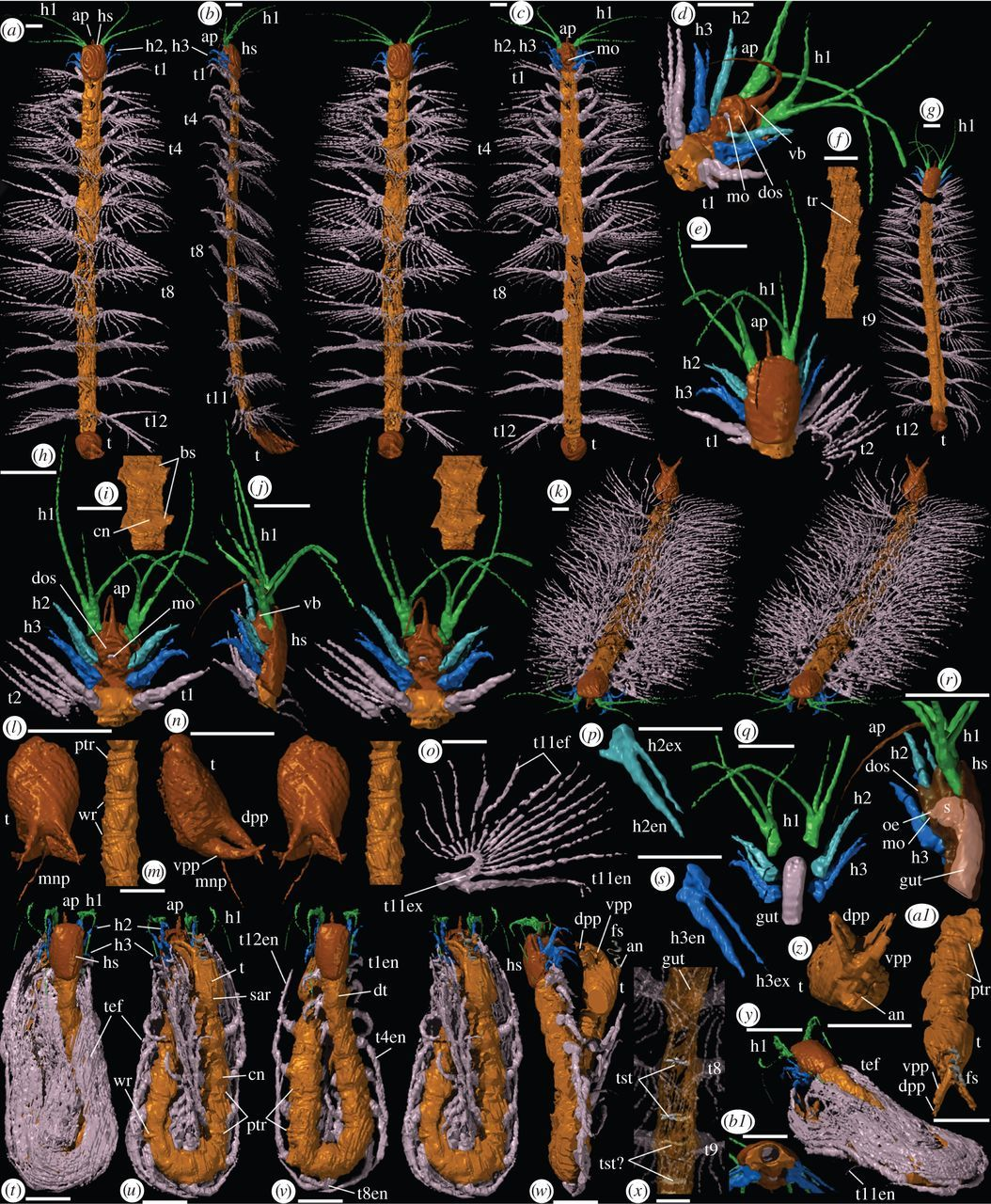
- Virtual reconstructions of Enalikter aphson

Scientific classification
- Kingdom: Animalia
- Phylum: Arthropoda
- Class: †Megacheira (?)
- Family: †Enaliktidae
- Genus: †Enalikter
- Species: †E. aphson

Binomial name
- †Enalikter aphson Siveter et al., 2014

= Enalikter =

Enalikter Temporal range: Homerian

Extinct arthropod genus

Enalikter ("scourger of the sea") is an extinct arthropod described from the middle Silurian Herefordshire Lagerstätte at the England–Wales border in UK. This genus is known from only one species, E. aphson. Enalikter is described as late-living example of Megacheira, "great-appendage arthropod". Other researchers subsequently suggested that it was an annelid; however, subsequent studies rejected this interpretation. Its interpretation as megacheiran arthropod has been questioned in later studies.

== Morphology ==
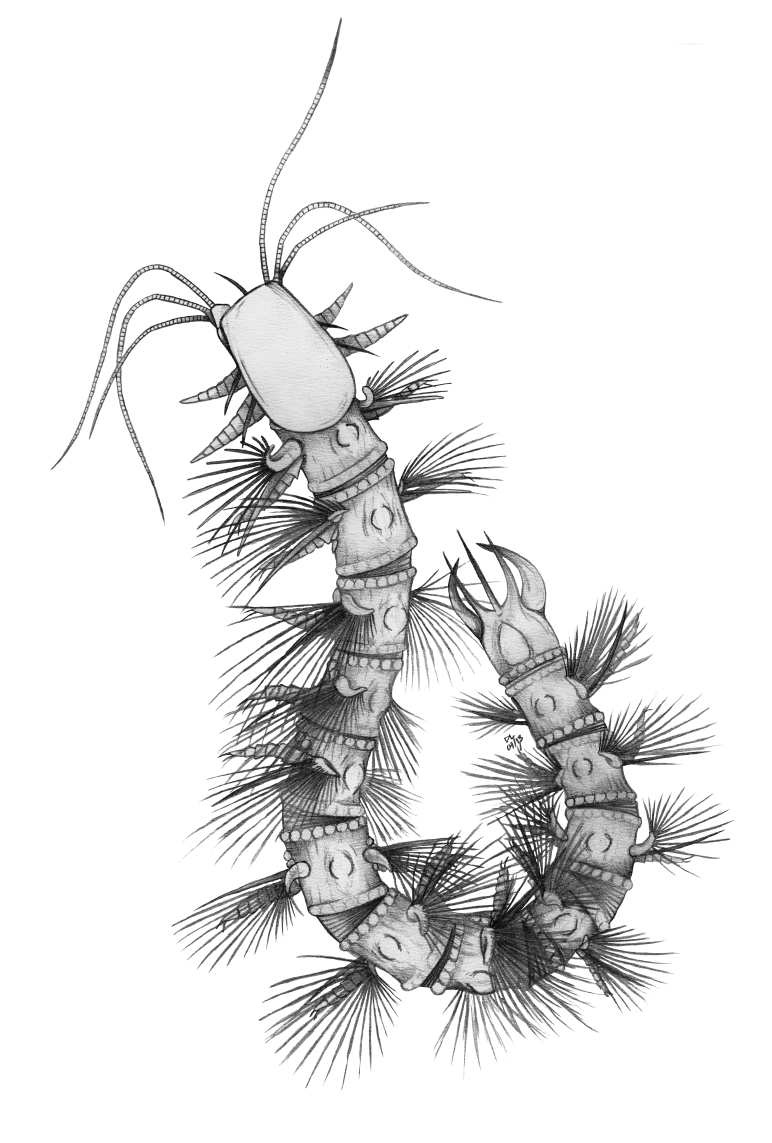
Reconstruction of E. aphson

Enalikter is small arthropod with length just around 2.44 cm (0.96 in) long. Head shield is subrectangular and lacked eyes. Median, unpaired antenna and three pairs of appendages can be seen on head, and a first appendage had three tapering flagella. Twelve trunk segments lack tergites, and is flexible to bend at least 90 degrees. Trunk appendages are biramous. The egg-shaped telson had two pairs of blade-like processes.

== Classification ==
Enalikter is probably related to Bundenbachiellus, a larger arthropod genus from later Early Devonian Hunsrück Slate of Germany, due to morphological similarities between the two genera, though the taxa are clearly distinct. The two genera constitute the family Enaliktidae. The original description suggested that Enaliktidae belonged to Megacheira, a group of arthropods with similar looking cephalic appendages. However, in 2015, other researchers questioned its affinity as arthropod, and considering from characters like lack of tergites, flexible trunk segments, and unpaired antenna, it is considered that is more likely to be an annelid. This hypothesis was rejected by two later studies, because these characters are also known from various arthropod taxa, in addition there are features that demonstrate an arthropod affinity, like ventrally placed mouth and J-shaped gut. Moreover, the characters that used to diagnose as annelids by these researchers are taken from different annelids, and there is no one annelid taxon that shares these characteristics. Although it is likely to be an arthropod, its affinity as megacheiran is still questioned, due to the fact that homology between the cephalic appendages of the two groups is unclear.
