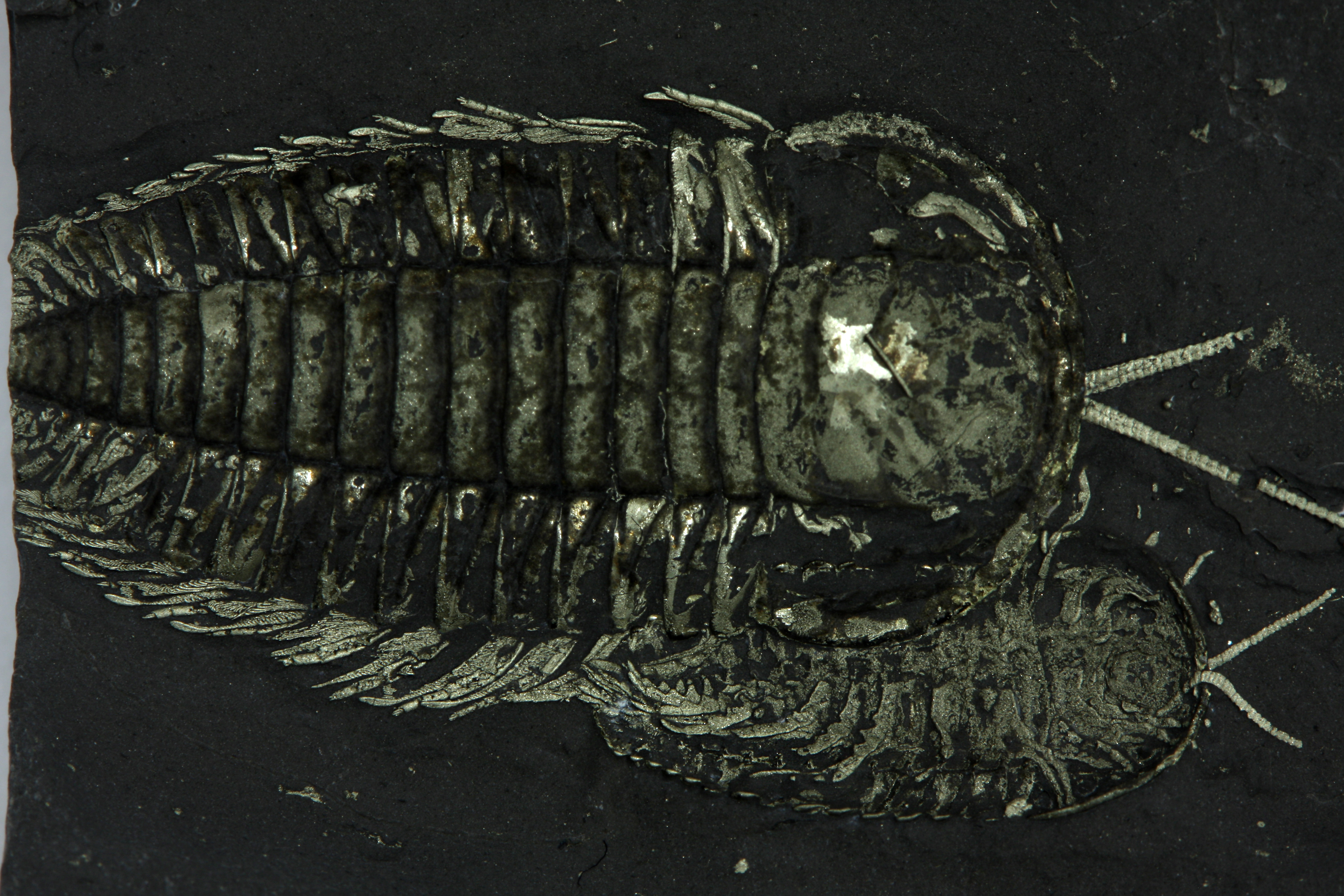
- Two Triarthrus eatoni specimens showing the dorsal and ventral sides of the trilobite

Scientific classification
- Kingdom: Animalia
- Phylum: Arthropoda
- Clade: †Artiopoda
- Class: †Trilobita
- Order: †Ptychopariida
- Family: †Olenidae
- Genus: †Triarthrus; Green, 1832

Species
- T. beckii Green, 1832 (type species) = Paradoxides beckii, Calymene beckii; T. billingsi Barrande, 1872; T. canadensis Smith, 1861; T. eatoni (Hall, 1838) = T. macastyensis; T. glaber Billings, 1859; T. huguesensis Förste, 1924; T. latissimus Månsson, 1998; T. linnarssoni Torslund, 1940; T. novoaustralis Smith et al., 2024; T. rougensis Parks, 1921; T. sichuansis Lu & Chang, 1974; T. spinosus Billings, 1857

= Triarthrus =

Triarthrus Temporal range: Upper Ordovician

Genus of trilobite

Triarthrus is a genus of Upper Ordovician ptychopariid trilobite found in New York, Ohio, Kentucky, and Indiana, eastern and northern Canada, China and Scandinavia. It is the last of the Olenid trilobites, a group which flourished in the Cambrian period. The specimens of T. eatoni that are found in the Beecher's Trilobite Bed, Rome, New York area are exquisitely preserved showing soft body parts in iron pyrite. Pyrite preservation has given scientists a rare opportunity to examine the gills, walking legs, antennae, digestive systems, and eggs of trilobites, which are rarely preserved. Triarthrus is therefore commonly used in science texts to illustrate trilobite anatomy and physiology.

== Distribution ==
- T. beckii Upper Caradoc and Ashgill, Snake Hill Formation, Cohoes, New York State; and Kentucky.
- T. billingsi Ashgill?, Quebec
- T. canadensis is known from the Upper Ordovician of Canada (Katian, lower Member of the Whitby Formation, Craigleith vicinity, Georgian Bay area; middle Member of the Whitby Formation, Whitby, Rogue River and Pickering, all Lake Simcoe area, Ontario)
- T. eatoni Upper Caradoc-Ashgill, N.Y., is known from the Upper Ordovician of Canada (Ashgill, lower Member of the Whitby Formation, Craigleith vicinity, Georgian Bay area, Lake Simcoe area, Ontario; and Quebec) and the United States (New York)
- T. glaber Ashgill, Quebec
- T. huguesensis Ashgill, Quebec
- T. latissimus Sweden
- T. linnarssoni Norway and Sweden
- T. rougensis Ashgill, Ontario
- T. sichuansis China
- T. spinosus is known from the Upper Ordovician of Canada (Katian, middle Member of the Whitby Formation, Rogue River and Pickering, both Lake Simcoe area, Ontario and Quebec), and the United States (New York).
- T. novoaustralis is known from Upper Ordovician of Australia (middle Katian, Malachis Hill Formation)

== Taxonomy ==
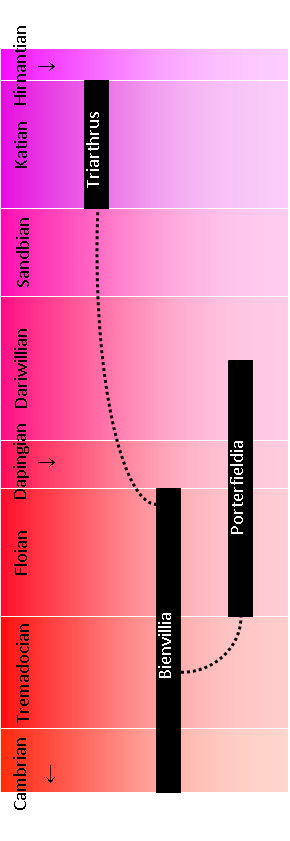
Cladogram showing the assumed relationships and known temporal distribution of the genera Bienvillia, Porterfieldia and Triarthrus, family Olenidae

T. beckii and T. eatoni have long been considered closely related and possibly synonymous. Recent comparative analysis showed that there is no sharp distinction between the two, but that they seem to represent opposing morphotypes. T. beckii dominates earlier in the distribution and in shallow water, while T. eatoni does so later and in deeper waters. It is probable that the transgression of the sea level aided the eventual disappearance of the T. beckii morph. The occurrence of the supposed pluriform species continued for more than two million years.

=== Species previously assigned to Triarthrus ===
- T. angelini = Bienvillia angelini
- T. belli = Parabolinella sp.
- T. caenigenus = Porterfieldia caenigena
- T. convergens = Porterfieldia convergens
- T. fisheri = Porterfieldia fisheri
- T. goldwyerensis = Porterfieldia goldwyerensis
- T. humilis = Porterfieldia humilis
- T. jachalensis = Porterfieldia jachalensis
- T. pacificus = Porterfieldia pacifica
- T. papilosus = Porterfieldia papilosa
- T. parapunctatus = Porterfieldia parapunctata
- T. parchaensis = Bienvillia parchaensis
- T. punctatus = Porterfieldia punctata
- T. rectifrons = Bienvillia rectifrons
- T. reedi = Porterfieldia caenigena
- T. shinetonensis = Bienvillia shinetonensis
- T. sinensis = Porterfieldia sinensis
- T. tetragonalis = Bienvillia tetragonalis
- T. thor = Porterfieldia thor
- T. variscorum = Parabolina frequens

== Description ==
=== Exoskeleton ===
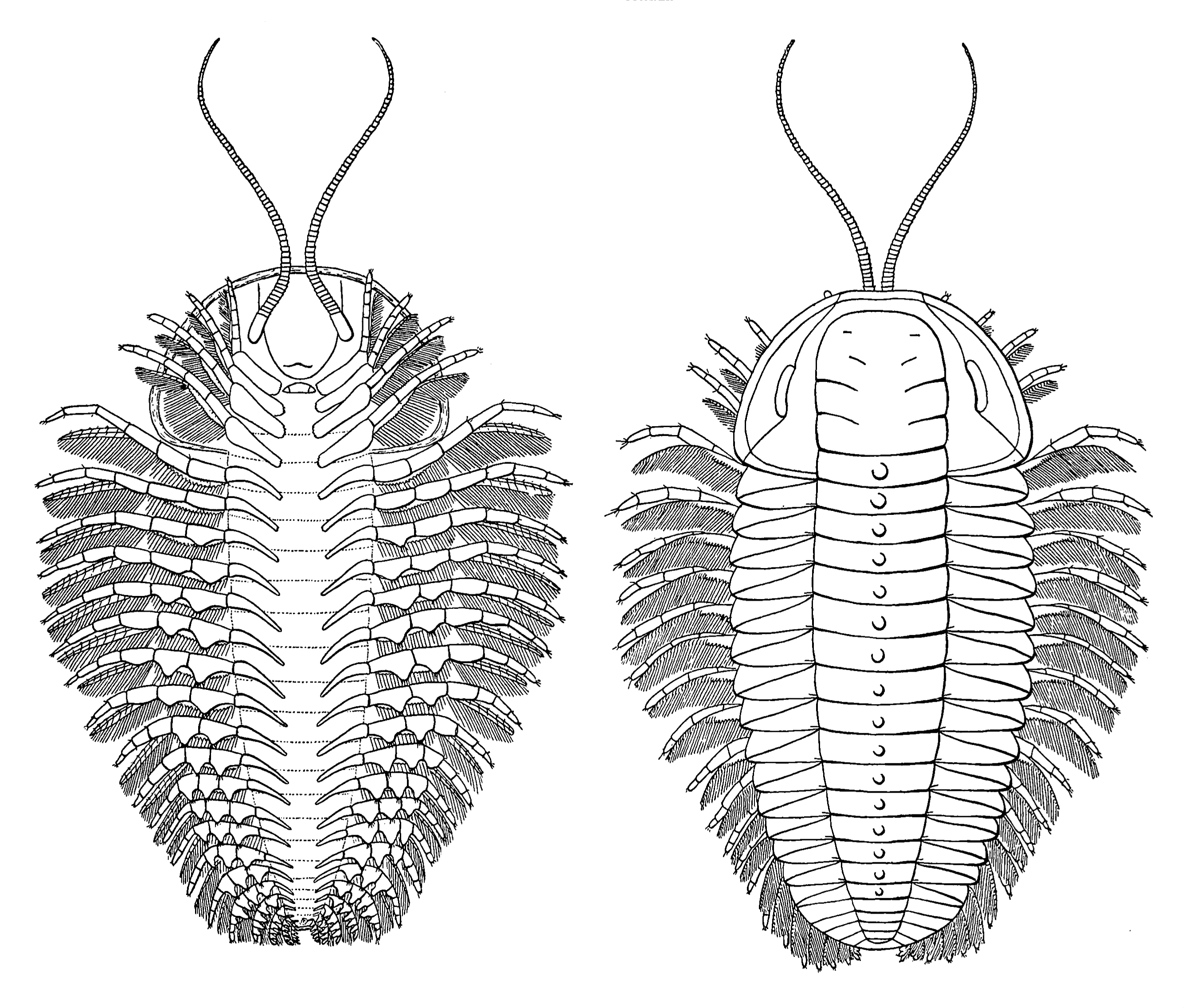
Reconstruction of Triarthrus eatoni, showing the appendages

Triarthrus is an average size trilobite (up to about 5 centimetres or 2.0 inches) and its moderately convex body is about twice as long as wide (excluding spines). Like in all Olenidae, the headshield (or cephalon) of Triarthrus has opisthoparian sutures, and the right and left free cheeks that they define are yoked. The cephalon in Triarthrus is semicircular. The central raised area (or glabella) is approximately quadrate, and considerably wider than the posterior margin of the fixed cheeks (or fixigenae). The front of the glabella is close to the anterior border (or the preglabellar field is short), but the border furrow is absent in front of the glabella. The facial suture crosses in front of the glabella on the top of an inflated rim. The posterior end of the glabella consists of the occipital ring that is defined by a furrow crossing over the midline. The occipital ring carries a small node at its centre point, and may be adorned with a backward directed spine as long as the glabella. In front of the occipital furrow two pairs of lateral furrows emerge from the axial furrow almost perpendicularly and curve backwards as they cut toward the midline, but without reaching it. Anteriorly, one or two further furrows are isolated shallow slits or depressions. The fixigenae are very narrow (less than ¼ of the width of the glabella at the back of the eye, and less than ½ at the occipital ring). The librigenae are narrow, and with or without spines. The border is prominent elsewhere, and the eyes of small to medium size, sitting at the end of small palpebral lobes next to the frontal half of the glabella. The thorax consists of 13 to 16 segments, with the axis wider than pleural regions, obliquely truncated or rounded pleural tips, and the fulcrum placed very close to the axis. The tailpiece (or pygidium) is small, with 3 to 5 axial rings, distinctly segmented pleural fields, and an entire, evenly rounded margin.

=== Uncalcified parts ===
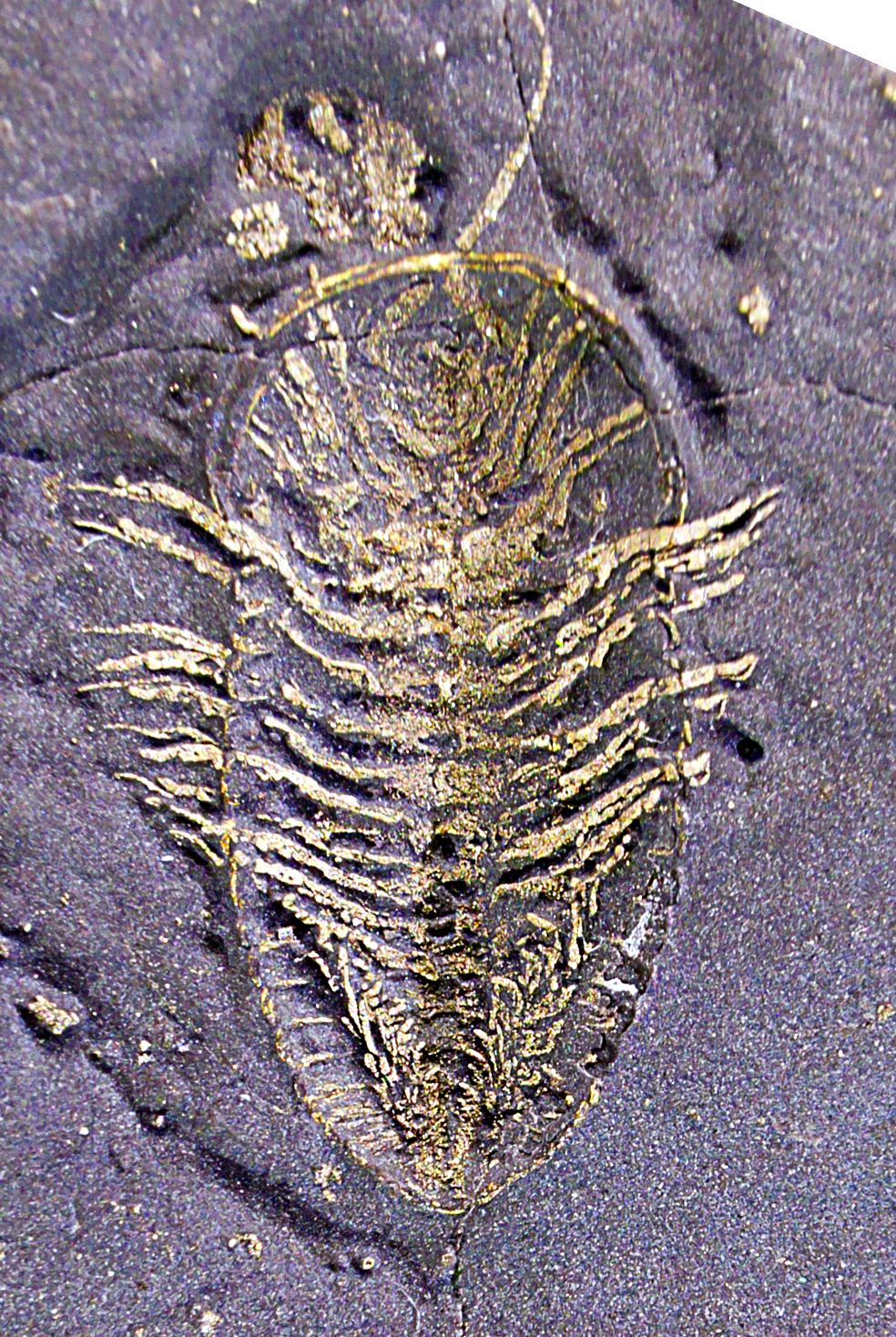
Pyrite preserved Triarthrus eatoni - ventral side

The foremost pair of extremities in trilobites are the antennas. In Triarthrus eatoni the antennas are probably flexible. From their attachment adjacent to the hypostome they stretch inward and forward, almost touching each other at the point where, from a dorsal viewpoint, they appear from under the cephalic margin, then bending outward and then forward again in a slight S-curve. They are about twice as long as the headshield (or cephalon), each consisting of 40 to 50 segments that are shorter than wide. As the preservation of soft tissue in T. eatoni is excellent, it is probable that it lacked cerci, the most backward pair of extremities known from Olenoides serratus.

== Life history ==
Due to the existence of an excellently preserved deposit in the Frankfurt Shale near Rome, New York State, that suggests an entire population of Triarthrus eatoni was killed and quickly buried, it has been possible to make a plausible reconstruction of its life history. After hatching from roughly spherical eggs averaging ~0.2mm in diameter, the small protaspid and early meraspid stages supposedly lived between the plankton in the water column. This is derived from the fact that only exuviae of the early stages were found, making clear that they haven't died in the disaster that killed their elders. In this phase the larvae probably dispersed over large areas. After a few months, at about 2mm long T. eatoni started living at the sea floor. Here, it must have fed by filtering suspended food particles, probably comparable to the trunk limb filter-feeding Cephalocarida and Branchiopoda. The exoskeletons fall into five size categories, suggesting that T. eatoni had a distinct breeding season, likely annually, as is the case in almost all extant crustaceans (although some amphipods have two breeding periods per year). It could live through at least four breeding seasons, and at that age reach approximately 4 cm in length.

In Triarthrus becki, the holaspid phase of ontogeny and development began once the organism reached about 2.8 mm in cephalic length.

== Sources ==
- T. eatoni and T. rougensis photos.
