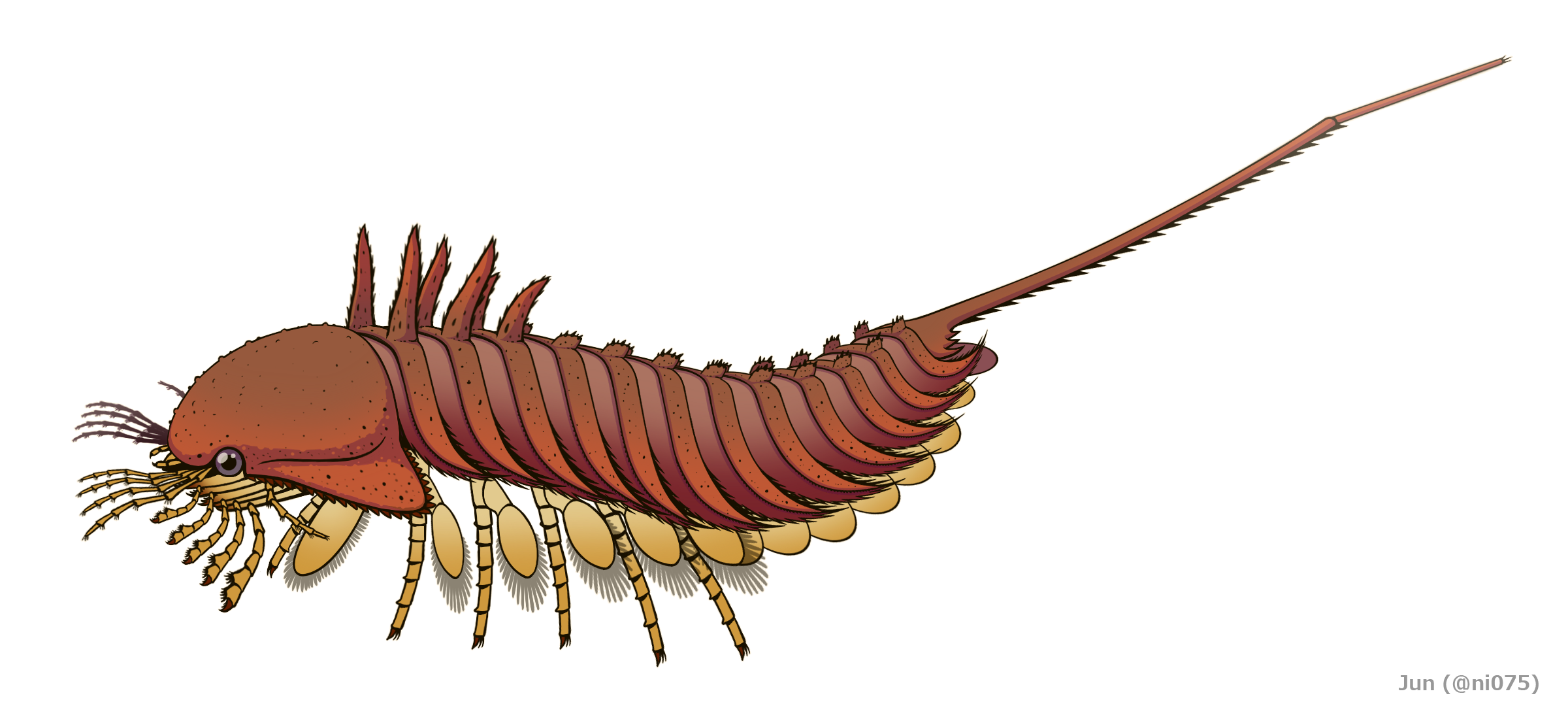
- Life restoration
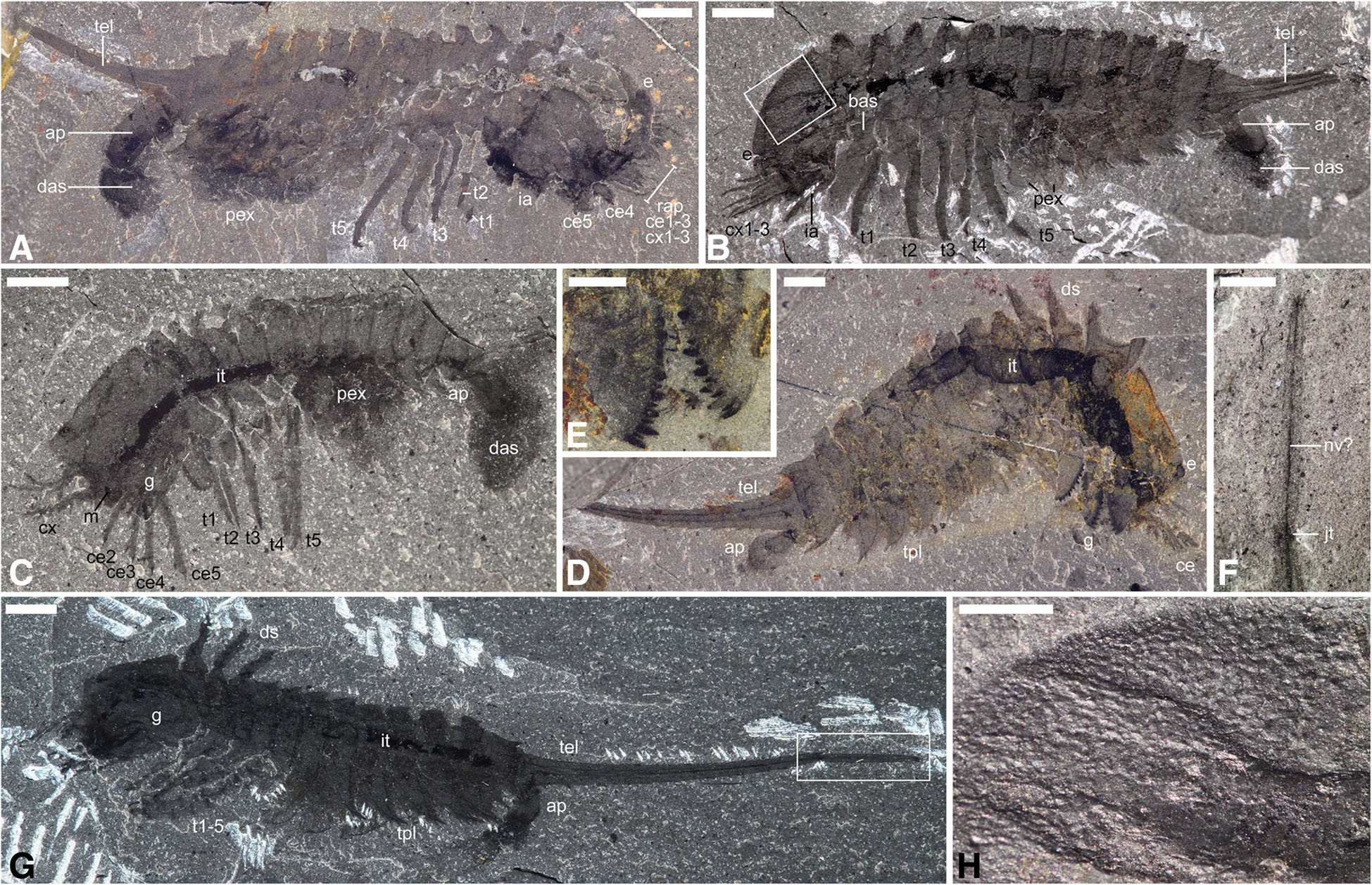
- Fossils of Habelia optata

Scientific classification
- Kingdom: Animalia
- Phylum: Arthropoda
- Subphylum: Chelicerata
- Order: †Habeliida
- Family: †Habeliidae; Aria & Caron, 2017
- Genus: †Habelia; Walcott, 1912
- Species: †H. optata

Binomial name
- †Habelia optata Walcott, 1912

= Habelia =

Habelia Temporal range: Miaolingian

Extinct genus of arthropods

Habelia is a genus of extinct arthropods from the Middle Cambrian, thought to be one of the earliest known relatives of chelicerates. Its fossils have been found in the Burgess Shale in British Columbia, Canada. Fifty-four specimens of Habelia are known from the Greater Phyllopod bed, where they comprise 0.1% of the community.

== Description ==
External videos
- Animated 3D model of Habelia moving its gnathobases
- Animated turntable rotation of 3D model of Habelia

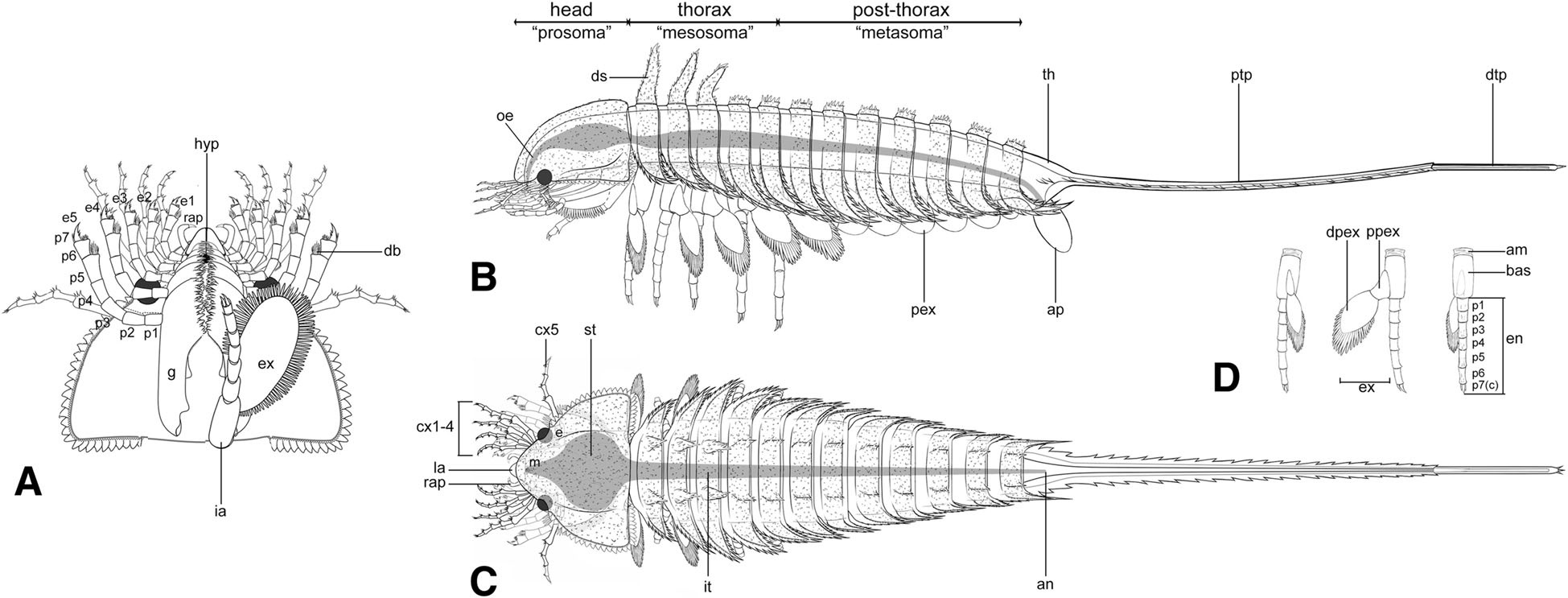
Diagram in various views. A = head viewed from below. B = side-on view, C = view from above, D = diagram of trunk limbs, e1-5 = cephalic (head) limb endopods, cx=cephalic (head) exopod g = gnathobase, en = endopod, ex = exopod, p1-7 = numbered podomeres of endopod

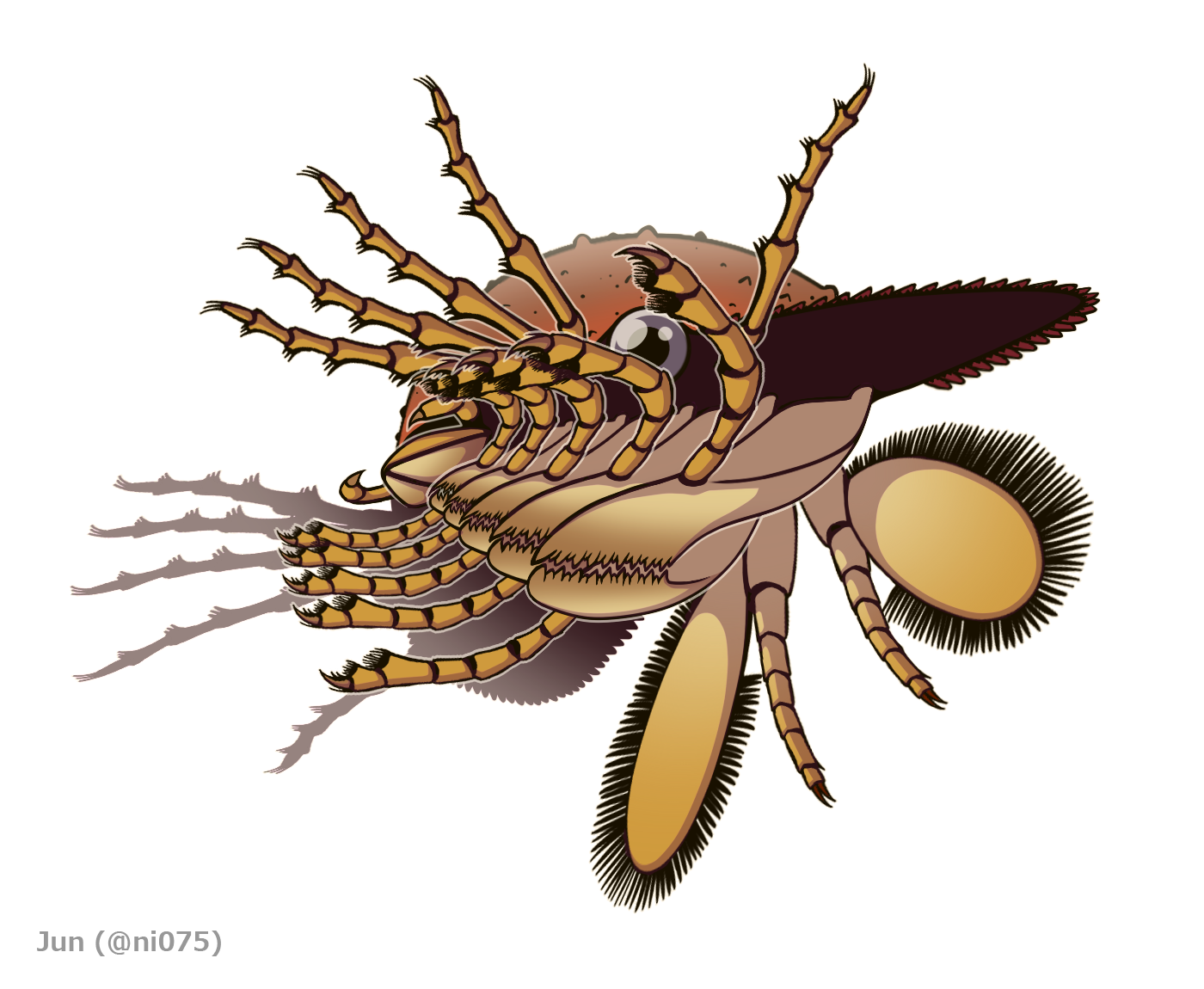
Closeup restoration of the head

The body is divided into two main segments. The cephalon ("head")/prosoma with seven segments/8 somites, and the trunk with 12 segments, making for a total of 19 body segments. The body is around 8.5 to 34 millimetres (0.33 to 1.34 in) in length excluding the long telson that terminates the body. The head, which is 25% wider than it is long, makes up about 30% of the total body length, and has a bulging shape, with triangular genal spines projecting outward at its edges. It housed the stomach of the animal. The head bore a pair of spherical compound eyes, which were accommodated by notches in the head shield. A hypostome-labrum complex was present, with the mouth openling vertically close to the front of the head. The first pair of appendages was very short and probably flexible, this was followed by 5 pairs of appendages that bore large gnathobases (modified basipod/base of the appendages used to process food), increasing in size posteriorly which bore staggered rows of strongly sclerotized teeth on their inner edge. The limbs were biramous (divided into two branches), The endopods (lower branch) of these limbs increased in size posteriorly, and had seven segments/podomeres, with the terminating segment being a claw, with podomeres 5 and 6 having borne a brush of inward facing setae (hair-like structures). The exopods (upper branch) of these limbs were elongate and thin rami, increasing in size posteriorly, each composed of 7 or more podomeres, which bore setae at the segment joints.

There is one pair of biramous limbs on the margin between the head and trunk, which is morphologically similar to the trunk limbs. The exopods of the biramous trunk limbs are paddle-shaped and fringed with thin lamellae/setae, while the endopods are similar to those of the cephalon/head in being 7 segmented and clawed, with two smaller claws on segment 6. The basipods of these limbs were cylindrical and broad, and did not function as gnathobases. The trunk is subdivided into the anterior thorax with 5 segments and the posterior post-thorax with 7 segments. Some specimens bear three pairs of upward pointing dorsal spines along the first three trunk segments. This may have been a sexually dimorphic feature. The 5 segments of the thorax each bear biramous limbs. The segments of the post-thorax bore pairs of exopods decreasing in size posteriorly, but there are no visible endopods, meaning that they were either reduced or entirely absent. The body ended with a long rod-shaped telson.

== Ecology ==
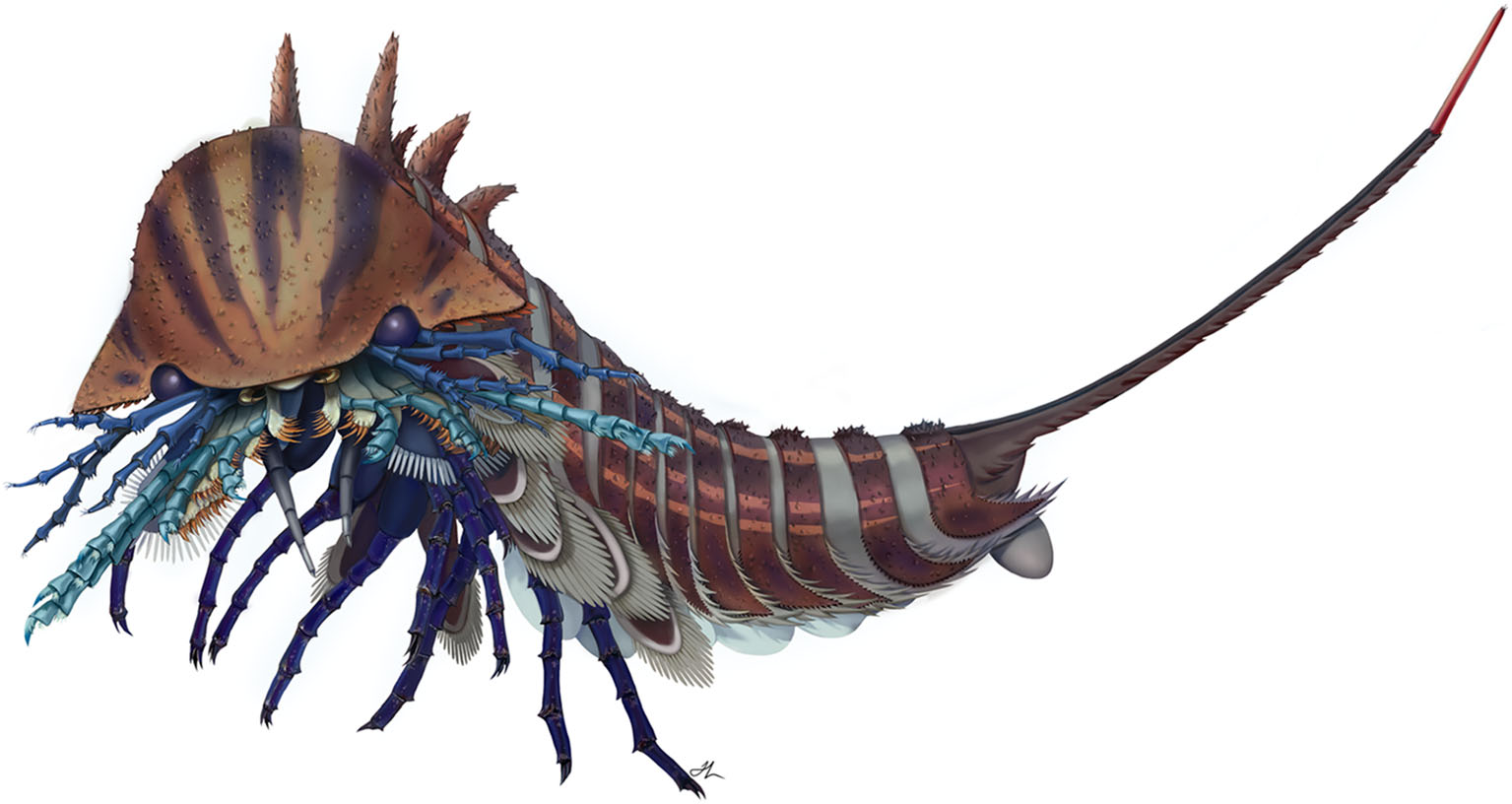
Life restoration

Habelia is thought to have been a durophagous predator, using its gnathobases to feed on hard shelled organisms. It is thought to have used the upper exopod head appendages as sensory organs akin to the antennae of other arthropods, while using the spined head endopods to grasp prey.

== Taxonomy ==
While previously enigmatic, a 2017 redescription found that it formed a clade (Habeliida) with Sanctacaris, Utahcaris, Wisangocaris and Messorocaris as a stem-group to Chelicerata, with Habelia being placed in the monotypic family Habellidae within Habeliida.

Cladogram of Pan-Chelicerata after Lerosey-Aubril & Ortega-Hernández, 2026. Orange bar denotes members of Megacheira, while red denotes members of Habeliida.

- - Pan‑Chelicerata
    - - †Jianfengia
      - †Sklerolibyon
    - - †Fortiforceps
      - †Yohoia
      - - †Haikoucaris
        - †Leanchoiliidae
      - - †Mollisoniida
        - - †Wisangocaris
          - †Habelia
          - - †Sanctacaris
            - †Utahcaris
          - chelicerae present
            - †Megachelicerax
            - - †Offacolus
              - - - †Setapedites
                  - †Dibasterium
                - - †Weinbergina
                  - - †Venustulus
                    - - Pycnogonida (sea spiders)
                      - - Xiphosura (horseshoe crabs)
                        - - Arachnida
                          - †Eurypterida (sea scorpions)

== See also ==
- Paleobiota of the Burgess Shale
