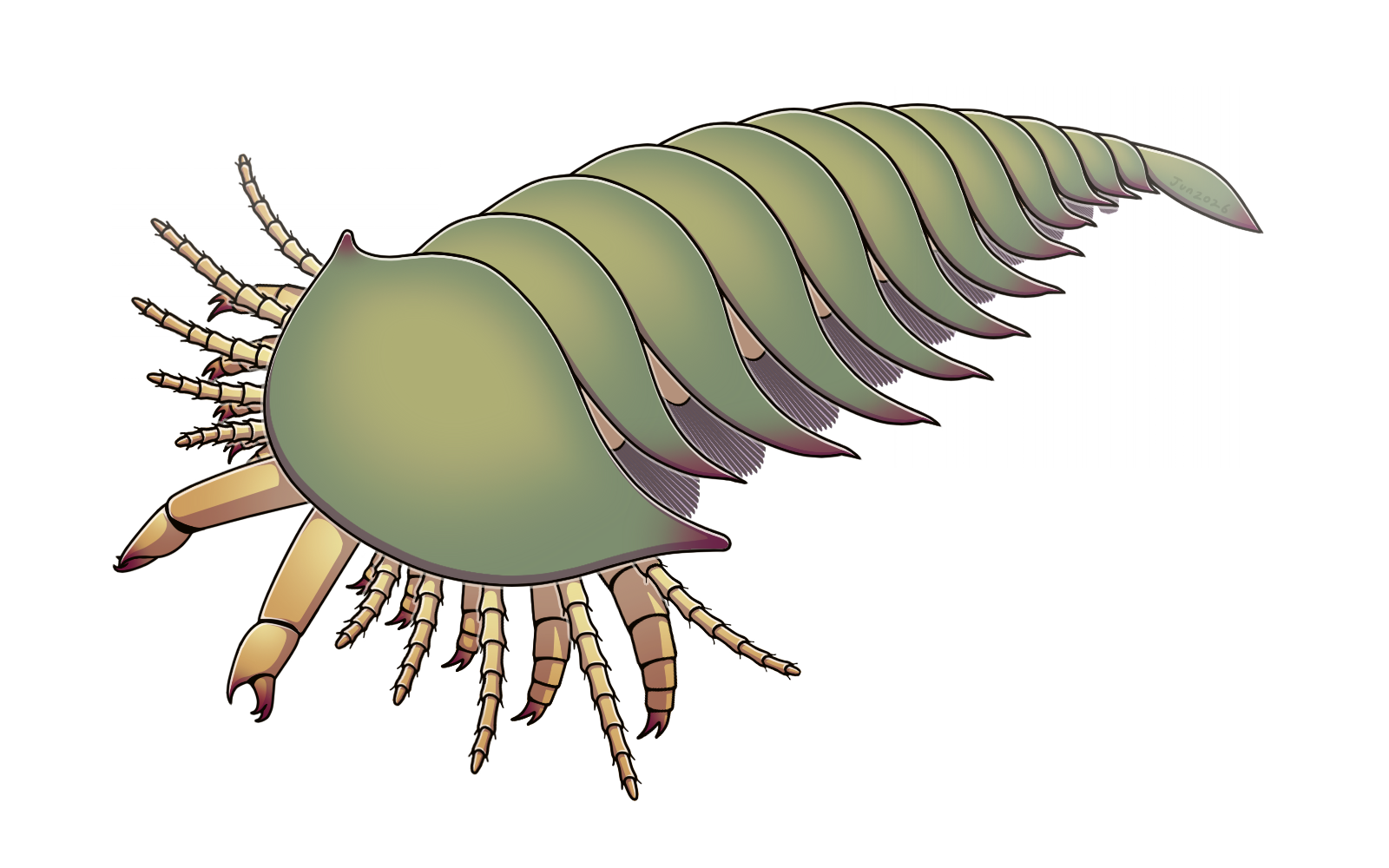
- Life restoration

Scientific classification
- Kingdom: Animalia
- Phylum: Arthropoda
- (unranked): Deuteropoda
- Subphylum: Chelicerata
- Genus: †Megachelicerax; Lerosey-Aubril & Ortega-Hernández, 2026

Type species
- †Megachelicerax cousteaui Lerosey-Aubril & Ortega-Hernández, 2026

= Megachelicerax =

Megachelicerax Temporal range: Cambrian, Miaolingian (Drumian)

Extinct genus of stem-chelicerates

Megachelicerax is an extinct genus of stem-chelicerate that lived in Utah during the middle Cambrian. It contains only a single species; Megachelicerax cousteaui. As the oldest known arthropod to bear chelicerae, Megachelicerax is significant in the evolutionary history of chelicerates, as it represents an important transitional stage between stem-group chelicerates like Habeliida and members of Euchelicerata.

== Discovery ==
The single known fossil of Megachelicerax (KUMIP.314091) was discovered by an amateur paleontologist during the 1970s, but was not described as a new genus until 2026. The fossil originates from the Wheeler Formation (Miaolingian: Drumian) of Utah. The genus name is intended to mean “large chelicera” (chelicera literally meaning “claw-horn”) in Greek. The species name honours the French oceanographer Jacques-Yves Cousteau.

== Description ==
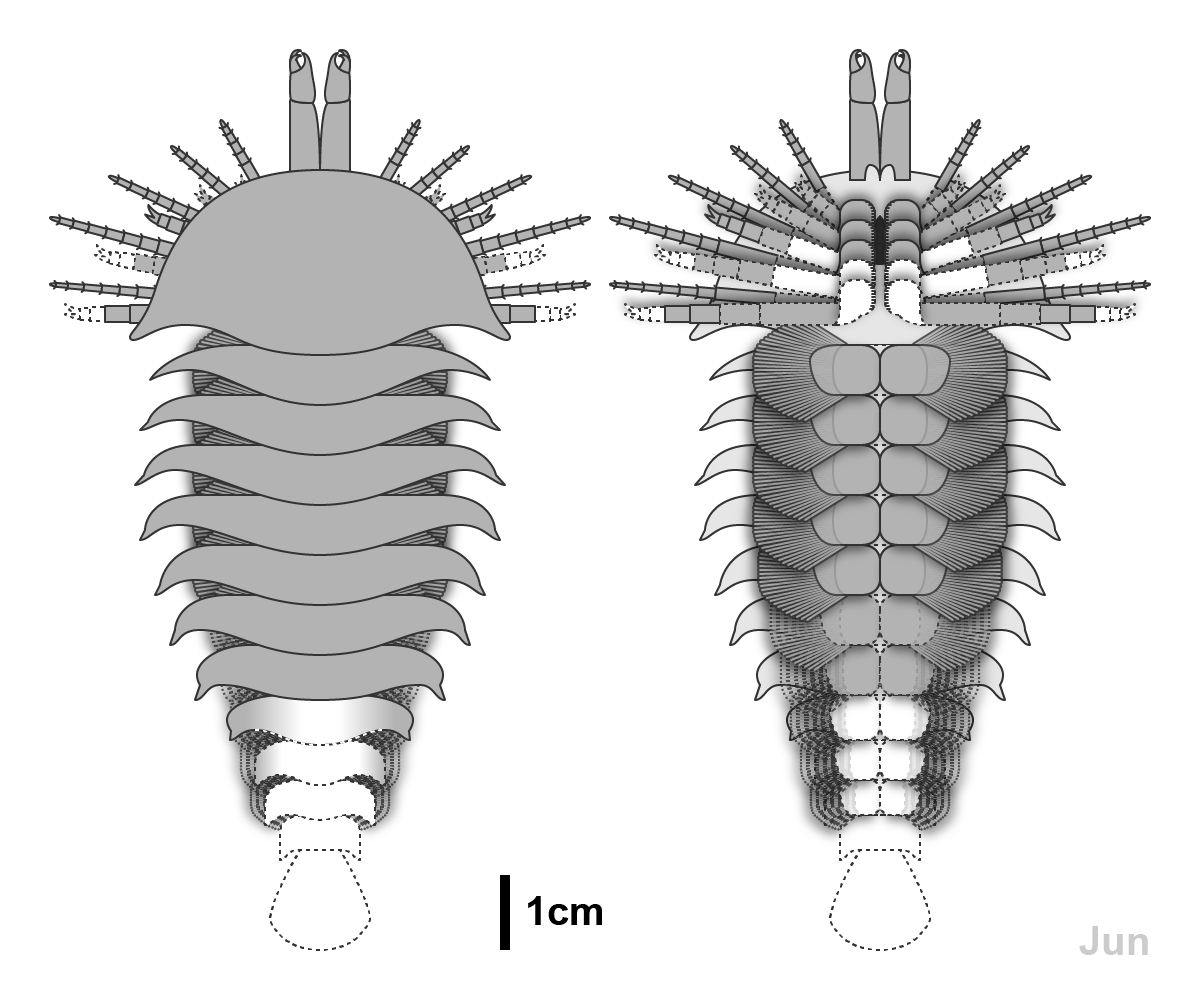
Diagrammatic reconstruction

Megachelicerax was fairly large, at around 8 centimetres (3.1 in) long for the posteriorly incomplete specimen, which estimated to be around 10 centimetres (3.9 in) long when alive. The body segments was grouped into two sections (tagma): a semi-circular prosoma (head) and a long, segmented opisthosoma (trunk). The prosomal shield had short genal spines (spines on the outer posterior edge of the head) and eyes are apparently absent. As the telson (tail) is unknown, the total number of opisthosomal segments is uncertain. At least 9 segments is visible, each covered by a tergite (upper body plate) with widely-spaced, acute tergopleurae (spine-like outwards to the side extensions of the tergites).

Underneath its body are appendages that indicate its chelicerate affinity. There are 6 pairs of appendages attached to the prosoma, the first one pair comprises large chelicerae projecting out of its front. It has a typical three-segmented morphology: a single proximal (closest to the body) segment followed by a two-segmented chela (pincer). The proximal segment is longer than the chela. Next are five pairs of pseudobiramous (two limb branches that are basally separated) prosomal limbs that have cylindrical and multisegmented exopodal rami (upper/outer branches), similar to those of habeliids and offacolids. The endopodal rami (inner/lower, leg-like branches) are incompletely known, but seemed to have had gnathobases (spiny basal segments used to crush and shred prey) and claw-like terminal segments. The length of the exopodal and endopodal rami appears to have increased in the posterior prosoma limbs. There are at least 7 pairs of plate-like lamellae (gill)-bearing opisthosomal/trunk appendages, refer to as gill plates. The plates are located within the body's axial region, resembling the operculum (book gill/lung-bearing appendages) of euchelicerates. The lamellae are partially overlapped and insert over the outer third surface of the plates, a condition intermediate between the thin marginal setae of habeliids and overlapped book gills of euchelicerates. The gill plates are presumed to be exopodal in origin, and there's no evidence of any opisthosomal endopods. It is unknown if the terminal segment is limbless like Sanctacaris.

Traces of internal organs corresponded to the appendages had been identified as well. Based on its well development within the gill plates, it is presumed to be the animal's haemolymph lacunar system.

== Paleoecology ==
Megachelicerax is presumed to be a nektobenthic predator that swam close to the seafloor, using its trunk/opisthosoma exopodal appendages with gill plates to both swim and breathe, and its specialized chelicerae, clawed endopods and gnathobases attached to its head section/prosoma to capture and process prey or carcasses on the sea floor. The cylindrical head/prosoma exopods may have played a sensory role similar to antennae in other arthropods.

== Phylogeny ==
Using both bayesian and parsimonious phylogenetic analysis, Megachelicerax was found to be a stem-chelicerate, placed between particularly basal clades like Habeliida and more derived ones such as Weinbergina.

Cladogram below after describing study. Orange bar denotes members of Megacheira, while red denotes members of Habeliida.

- - Pan‑Chelicerata
    - - †Jianfengia
      - †Sklerolibyon
    - - †Fortiforceps
      - †Yohoia
      - - †Haikoucaris
        - †Leanchoiliidae
      - - †Mollisoniida
        - - †Wisangocaris
          - †Habelia
          - - †Sanctacaris
            - †Utahcaris
          - chelicerae present
            - †Megachelicerax
            - - †Offacolus
              - - - †Setapedites
                  - †Dibasterium
                - - †Weinbergina
                  - - †Venustulus
                    - - Pycnogonida (sea spiders)
                      - - Xiphosura (horseshoe crabs)
                        - - Arachnida
                          - †Eurypterida (sea scorpions)

== See also ==
- Mollisonia - a genus with potentially similar significance.
- Habeliida, Offacolidae - taxa with comparable anatomy.
