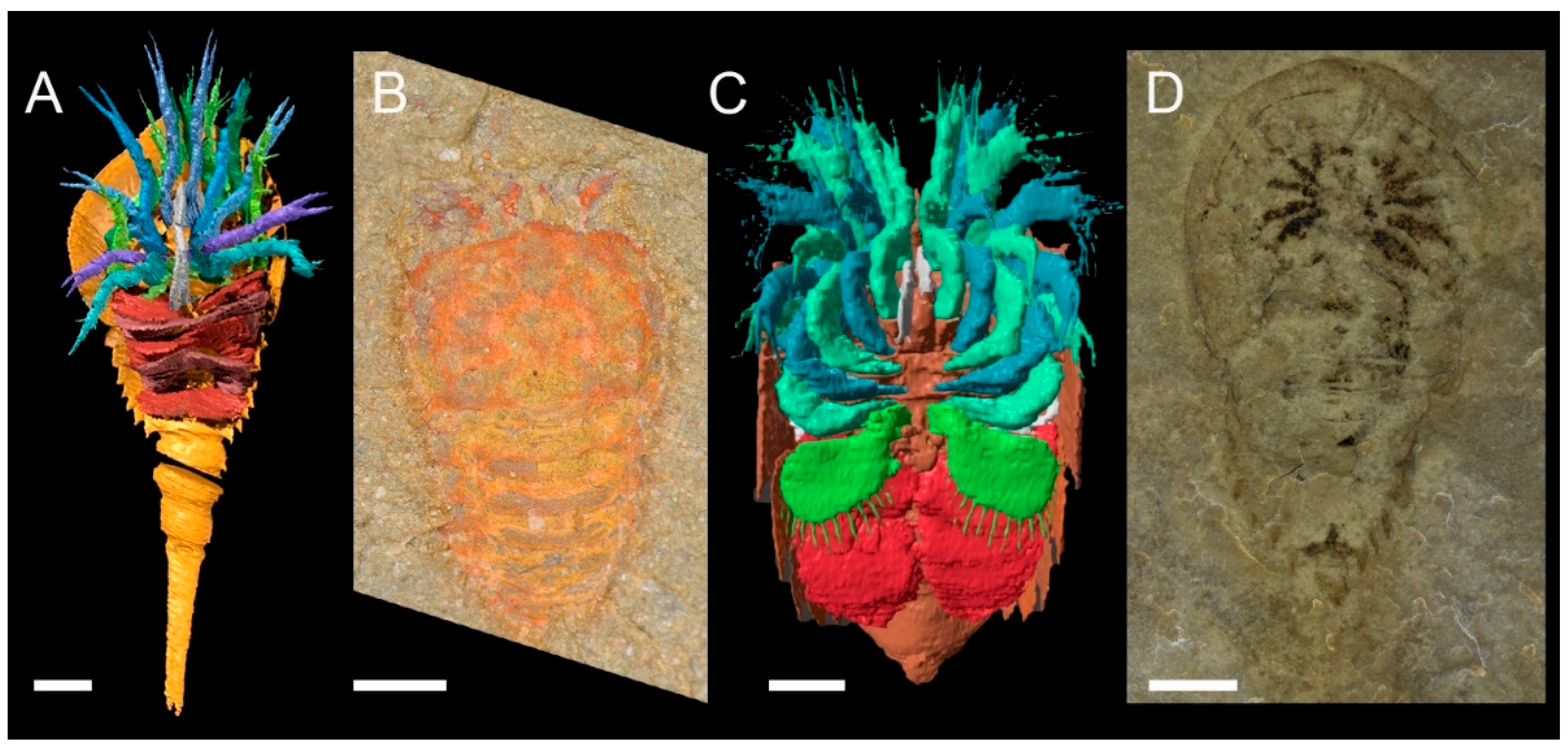
- Specimen of Dibasterium (A), Setapedites (B), Offacolus (C) and Bunaia (D).

Scientific classification
- Kingdom: Animalia
- Phylum: Arthropoda
- Subphylum: Chelicerata
- Clade: Euchelicerata
- Family: †Offacolidae; Sutton et al., 2002

Type species
- †Offacolus kingi Orr et al., 2000

Genera
- †Offacolus; †Dibasterium; †Setapedites; †Bunaia

= Offacolidae =

Offacolidae Temporal range: Ordovician–Silurian

Extinct family of chelicerates

Offacolidae is a family of basal euchelicerate arthropods from the Ordovician and Silurian of Europe, Morocco and North America.

== Morphology ==
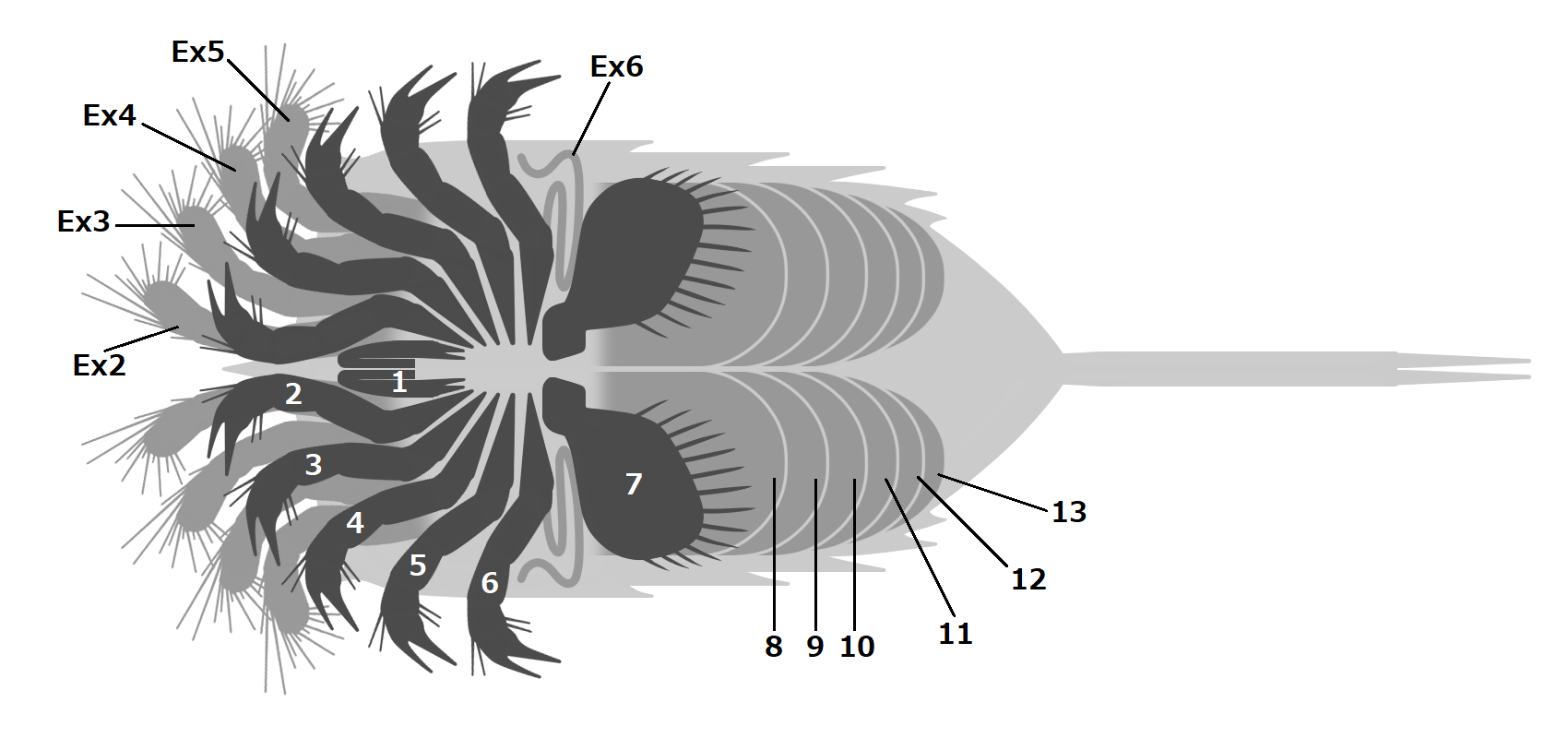
Offacolus

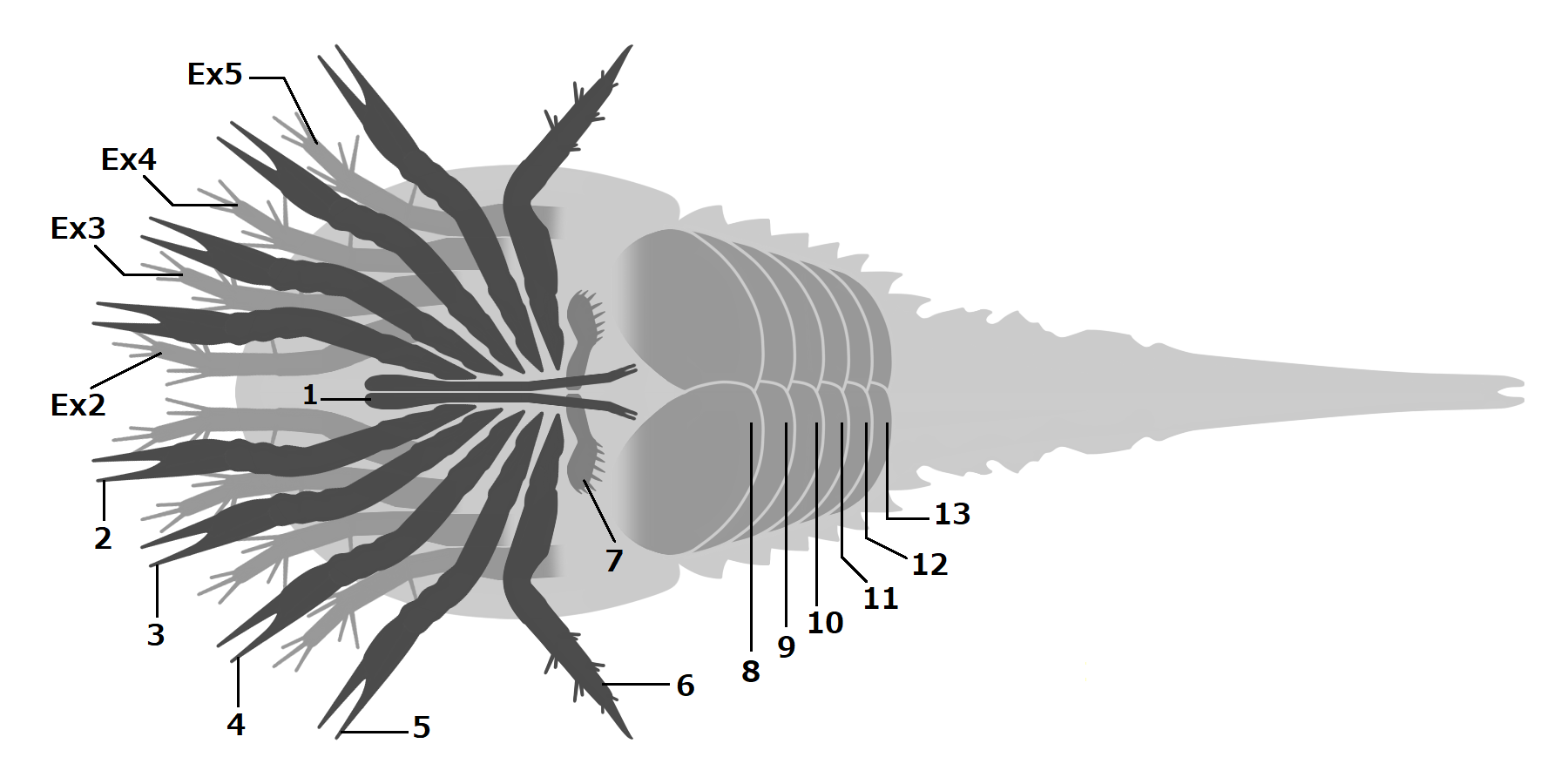
Dibasterium

Ventral appendages of offacolids, showing the distinctive prosomal exopods (Ex2-5), chelicerae (1) and seventh appendages (7). 2-6: prosomal endopods, 8-13: gill opercula

The overall appearance is similar to other synziphosurines and horseshoe crabs, featuring a dome-shaped prosomal (head) shield and an opisthosoma (trunk) divided by tergites (dorsal exoskeleton). The prosoma bearing a pair of chelicerae (pincer-like first appendage) and 5 pairs of endopods (leg-like lower limb branches). Eyes are generally absent, except Bunaia which might have ventral ocelli. The opisthosoma has around 9 to 11 segments in total, with 6 pairs of gill bearing flap-like appendage (opercula) located underneath its second to seventh segments. The last 3 segments may of may not forming a narrow postabdomen. Similar to many euchelicerates, the first opisthosomal tergite is variably reduced.

Nonetheless, the family is united by several features, notably the 6-segmented prosomal exopods (upper limb branches) originated from the second to (at least) fifth prosomal appendages, fringed by radially arranged terminal setae. The base of each exopod appears to be separated from their corresponding endopods, but some are suggest to be united by a basal segment (basipodite). Other diagnostic features including elongated chelicerae, reduced prosomal gnathobases , paddle-like seventh (first opisthosomal) appendages fringed by marginal setae, as well as a terminally bifurcated telson. Some also bearing a plate-like structures below their posterior body segment, a feature which rather resembling Habelia and Vicissicaudatan artiopods.

== Paleoecology ==
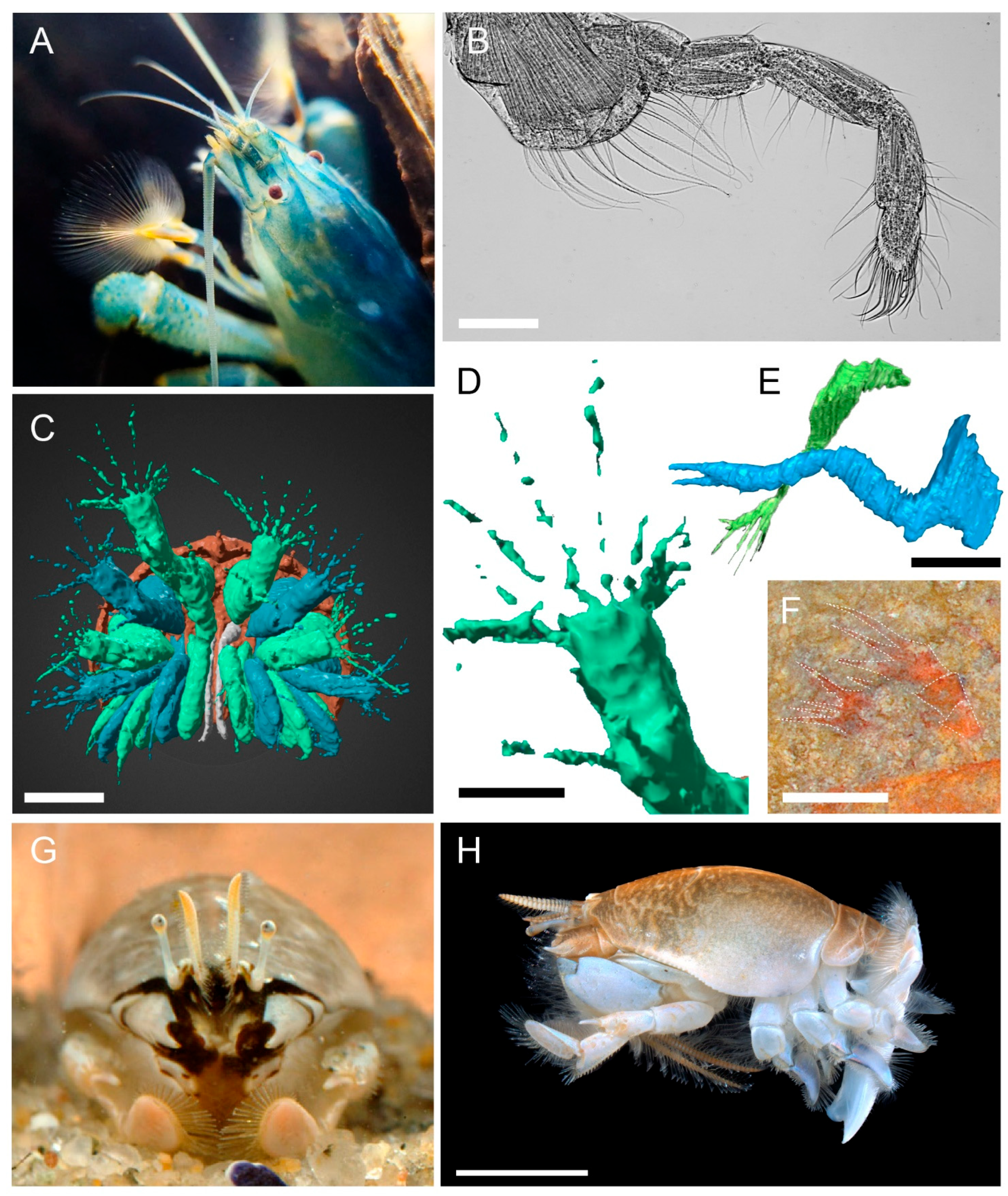
Comparison between offacolid prosomal appendages (C, D, E, F) and suspension feeding crustaceans (A, B, G, H).

Offacolids are marine animals, possibly using their prosomal endopods for walking while using their gill opercula for both breathing and swimming. The feeding ecology of offacolids had been largely unexplored, with only Offacolus initially though to be a bottom-dwelling predator or scavenger. Under this scenario, the prosomal exopods are purported to be sensory organs. However, a restudy in 2025 suggest offacolids might be a group of suspension feeder, an ecological niche that was explored by crustaceans but unique within the dominantly carnivore chelicerates. This hypothesis is supported by the morphology of their prosomal exopods (shape and orientation unsuitable for locomotion, setae density suitable for collecting mesoplankton), elongated chelicerae (long and slender shape ineffective for immobilizing prey, but have wider range of movement for manipulating tiny food particles) and reduced gnathobases (unsuitable to crush and manipulate hardened food item on the ventral side).

== Taxonomy ==
Since its original description, the family was included only the type genus Offacolus for decades. In 2024, Setapedites was described and the family was redefined, following by the re-classification of both Dibasterium and Bunaia as offacolids. They are part of the paraphyletic grade of basal euchelicerates known as synziphosurines.

It is an intermediate taxon between the Cambrian basal chelicerates (e.g. Habeliida, Megachelicerax) and other post-Cambrian euchelicerates (Prosomapoda), indicating by their well developed prosomal exopods which possibly retained from their Cambrian ancestors and lost in Prosomapoda. Phylogenetic results suggest it is either a monophyletic clade sister to Prosomapoda or a paraphyletic grade where Prosomapoda arose.

Cladogram after Lustri et al. 2024b, with focus on a monophyletic Offacolidae.

- - †Megacheira
  - - †Artiopoda
    - Chelicerata
      - Pycnogonida (sea spiders)
      - - - †Habelia
          - †Mollisonia
        - Euchelicerata
          - †Offacolidae
            - †Dibasterium
            - - †Offacolus
              - - †Bunaia
                - †Setapedites
          - Prosomapoda
            - †Weinbergina
            - - - †Camanchia
                - †Venustulus
              - - †Legrandella
                - - Xiphosura (horseshoe crabs)
                  - - - †Pasternakevia
                      - - †Cyamocephalus
                        - †Pseudoniscus
                    - - †Chasmataspidida
                      - - †Eurypterida (sea scorpions)
                        - Arachnida
