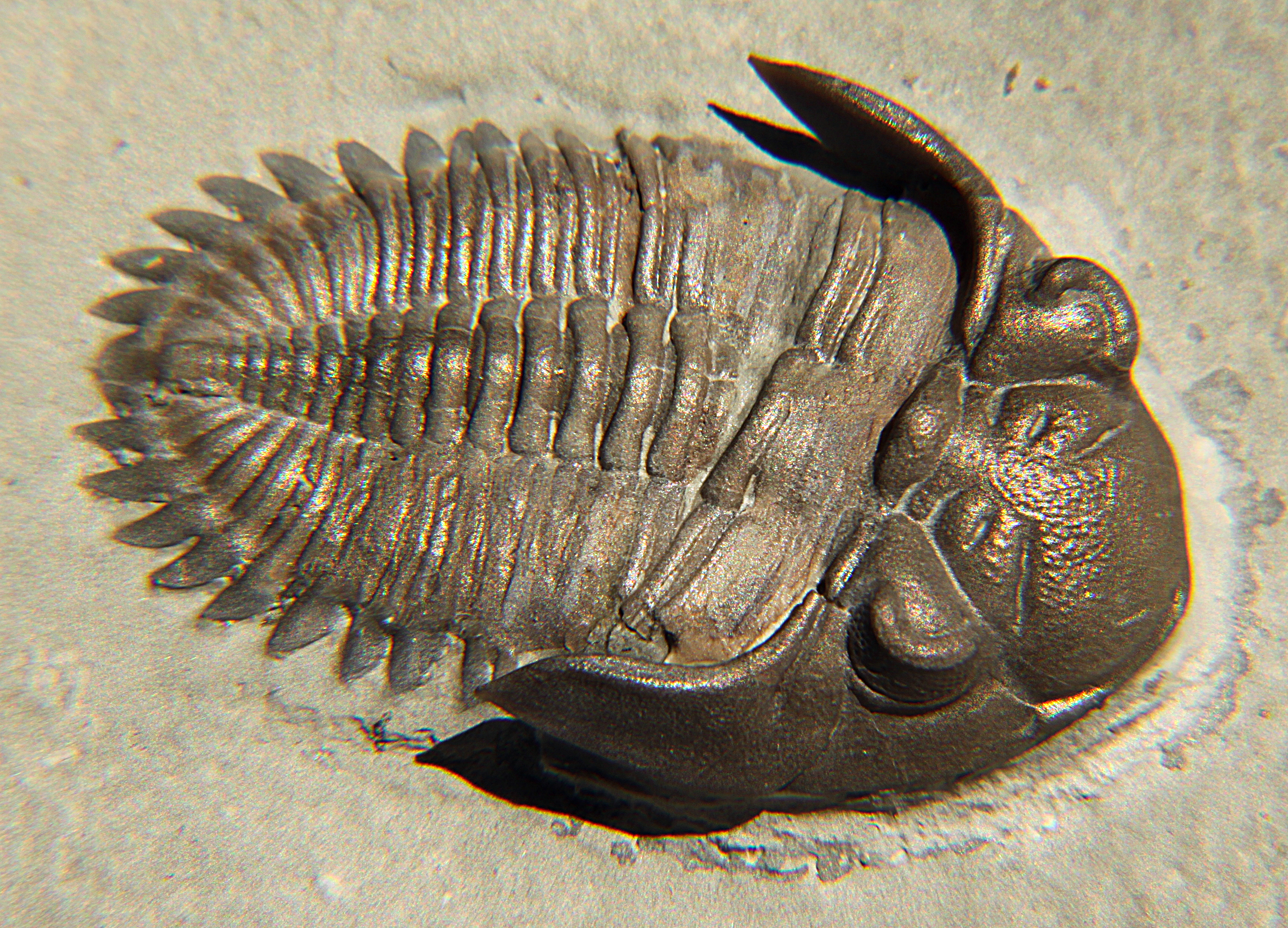
- Fossil of Bellacartwrightia calliteles, a trilobite
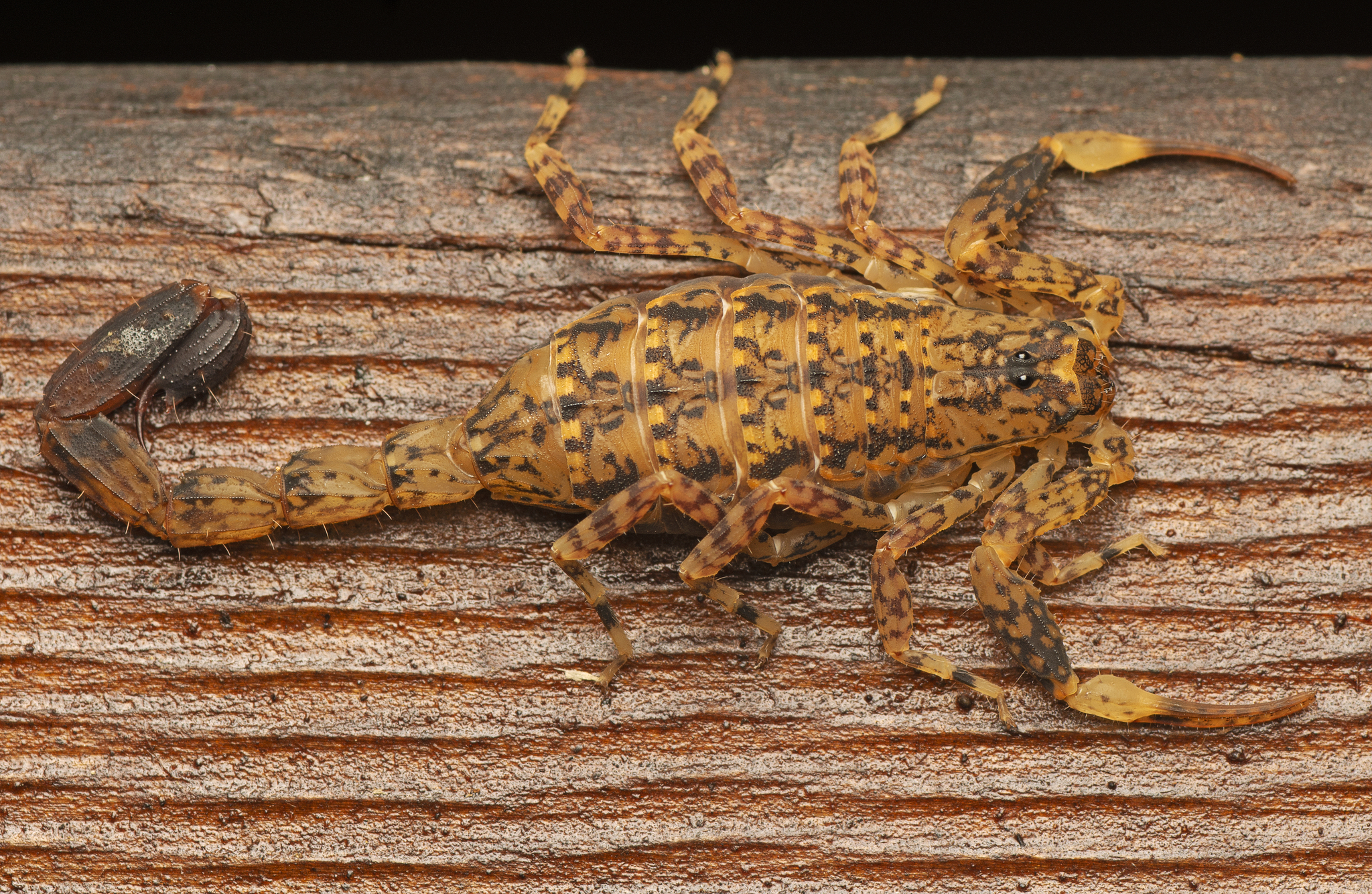
- Lychas variatus, a scorpion chelicerate

Scientific classification
- Kingdom: Animalia
- Phylum: Arthropoda
- Clade: Arachnomorpha; Lameere, 1890

Subgroups
- †Artiopoda; †Megacheira; ?†Marrellomorpha; Chelicerata

Synonyms
- Arachnata Paulus, 1979; Palaeopoda Packard, 1903

= Arachnomorpha =

Arachnomorpha Temporal range: Cambrian - Recent

Clade of arthropods

Arachnomorpha is a proposed subdivision or clade of Arthropoda, comprising the group formed by the trilobites and their close relatives (Artiopoda), Megacheira (which may be paraphyletic) and chelicerates. Under this proposed classification scheme, Arachnomorpha is considered the sister group to Mandibulata (including insects, crustaceans and myriapods).

The arachnomorph concept has been challenged by suggestions that the artiopods are more closely related to mandibulates, forming the clade Antennulata instead.

There is no consensus as to assigning Arachnomorpha a formal Linnean rank.

== Classification ==
Arachnomorpha Lameere, 1890 [= Arachnata Paulus, 1979, = Palaeopoda Packard, 1903]

- †Nettapezoura
- †Dicranocaris
- †Trilobita Walch, 1771
- †Megacheira Hou & Bergström, 1997
- †Strabopida Hou & Bergström, 1997
- †Aglaspida Walcott, 1911
- †Cheloniellida Broili, 1932
- Chelicerata Heymons 1901
  - Family †Sanctacarididae Legg & Pates, 2017
  - Class Pycnogonida Latreille, 1810
  - Clade Euchelicerata Weygoldt & Paulus, 1979
    - Family †Offacolidae Sutton et al., 2002
    - Clade Prosomapoda Lamsdell, 2013

=== Phylogeny ===
Using fossil data, Bergström & Hou (2003) gave an outline of arthropod relationships emphasizing trilobitomorphs (a group that includes trilobites and trilobite-like animals).

- - Arthropods
    - Arachnomorpha
      - - Limulavida
          Sidneyia
        - - Aglaspidida
          - Chelicerates
          - Cheloniellon
      - Trilobitomorpha (s.s.)
        - Marrellomorpha
          - Acercostraca
            Vachonisia
          - Marrellida
            - Mimetaster
            - Marrella
        - Emeraldellida
          Emeraldella
        - Retifaciida
          Retifacies
        - Core trilobitomorphs
          - Concilioterga Order Helmetiida
            - Helmetia
            - Kuamaia
            - - Sapenion
              - Tegopelte
          - Nectopleura (e.g. Nektaspida)
            Naraoia
          - Petalopleura Order Xandarellida
            - Cindarella
            - - Xandarella
              - Phytophilaspis
          - Trilobites, subclass Trilobita
    - - - - Hexapoda
          - Crustaceans
        - Yohoia
      - Canadaspis
      - Fuxianhuia
