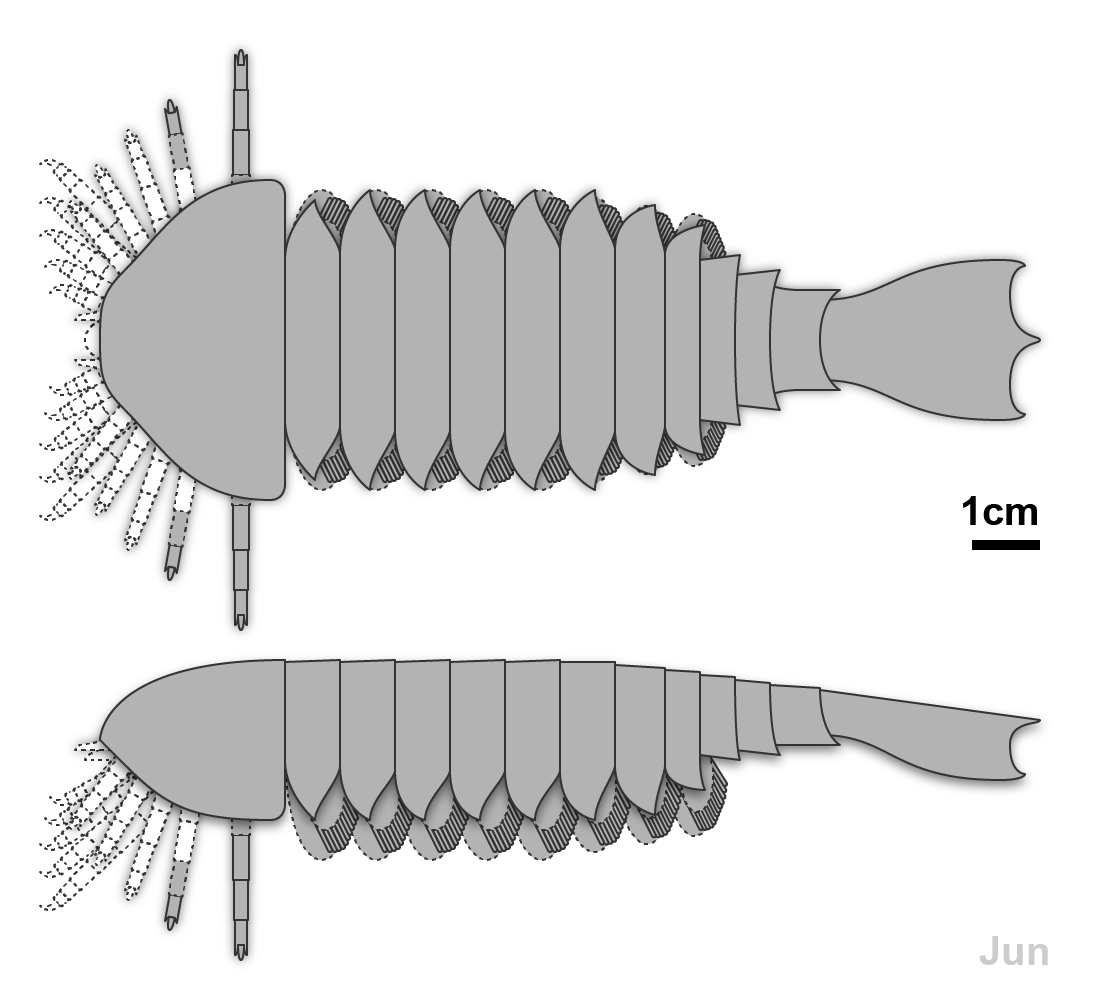
- Diagrammatic reconstruction as a habeliid

Scientific classification
- Kingdom: Animalia
- Phylum: Arthropoda
- Subphylum: Chelicerata
- Order: †Habeliida
- Genus: †Nettapezoura; Briggs et al., 2008

Type species
- Nettapezoura basilika Briggs et al., 2008

= Nettapezoura =

Nettapezoura Temporal range: Drumian

Extinct genus of arthropods

Nettapezoura is a monotypic genus of fossil arthropod. The only known species is Nettapezoura basilika from the Marjum Formation of Utah, dating back to the Cambrian (Drumian) period.

== Morphology ==
Nettapezoura is known only by one specimen, UU 04083.02, which preserved the body in a parallel oblique angle, revealing more of its left dorsolateral side.

The body consists of a cephalon (head) and an 11-segmented trunk. All of the dorsal exoskeletons (tergites) does not have any well-defined boundaries between the axial region (vaulted middle section) and tergopleurae (lateral extensions). The cephalon is covered by a semicircular shield. The first 8 trunk segments are wide and possess triangular tergopleurae. The last 3 trunk segments are narrow and tube-like. Telson (tail) widen posteriorly and trifurcated into 3 short spines, resembling the webbed foot of a duck and hence the name Nettapezoura ("duck foot tail").

Evidence of appendages are scarce. There are at least 2 pairs of thin, long appendages exposed from the cephalic shield. These were originally thought to be endopods (inner/lower branch), but subsequently identified as exopods (outer/upper branch) like those of habeliids and Megachelicerax. The trunk have at least 7, possibly 8 pairs of flap-like appendages, each possess an outer rami fringed by lamellae and an inner rami with leaf-like lobations. The last 3 trunk segments have no appendages.

== Classification ==
Similar to the co-described Dicranocaris, the taxonomic affinity of Nettapezoura is uncertain. Initially it was identified as an arachnomorph, later a sister group of either Sidneyia or Dicranocaris. Recent studies around 2020s suggest it is possibly a habeliid (stem chelicerate) alongside Dicranocaris and Messorocaris.
