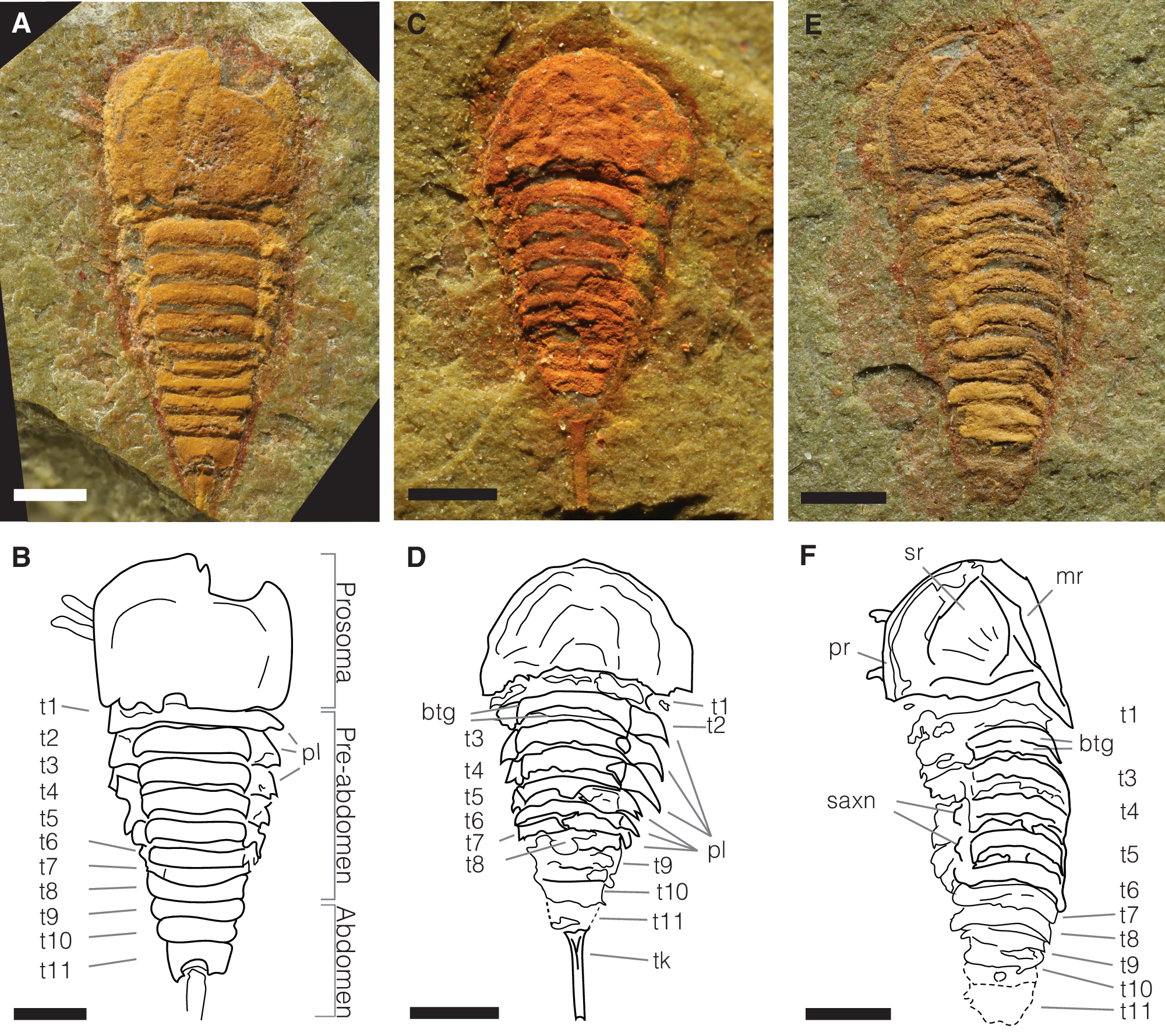
- Fossils of Setapedites
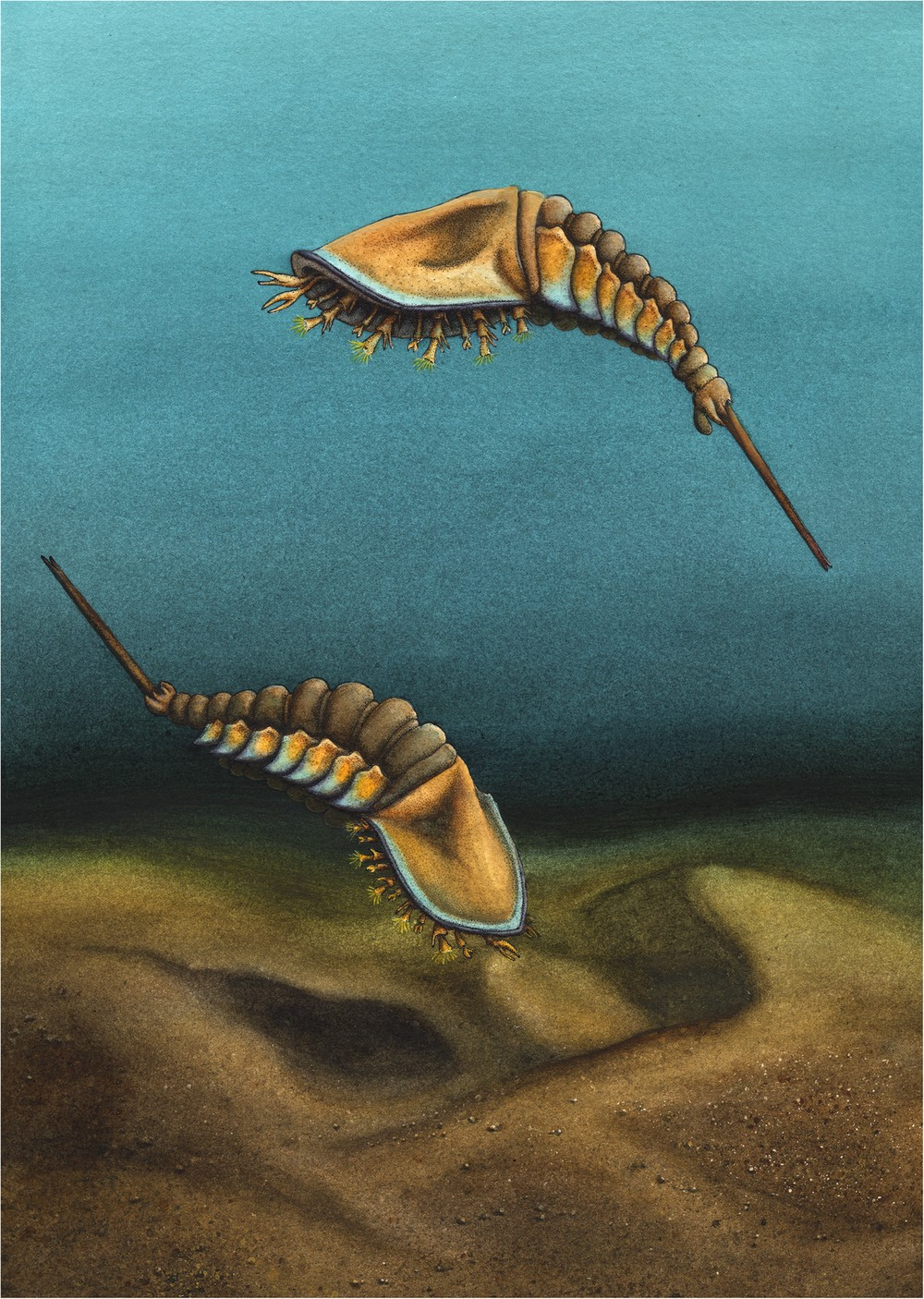
- Life restoration

Scientific classification
- Kingdom: Animalia
- Phylum: Arthropoda
- Subphylum: Chelicerata
- Family: †Offacolidae
- Genus: †Setapedites; Lustri, Gueriau & Daley, 2024
- Species: †S. abundantis

Binomial name
- †Setapedites abundantis Lustri, Gueriau & Daley, 2024

= Setapedites =

Setapedites Temporal range: Tremadocian–Floian

Extinct genus of synziphosurine

Setapedites is an extinct genus of Ordovician offacolid chelicerates from the Fezouata Formation of Morocco. The genus contains a single species, Setapedites abundantis.

== Discovery and naming ==
Setapedites is very common: hundreds of specimens were discovered in the Fezouata Formation, Drâa-Tafilalet, Morocco. They date back to the late Tremadocian stage of the Ordovician.

The generic translates to "foot with setae" and derives from the characteristic setae of the outer endopod segments. The specific name abundantis translates to "abundant", referring to how common the genus is within the Fezouata Formation.

== Description ==
Setapedites is roughly 6 mm long excluding the telson, with eleven body segments and a prosoma with six appendage pairs. The first appendage pairs are elongated chelicerae, with the other five being biramous appendages. The exopods of these appendages bear setae on their tips, hence the name Setapedites. The opisthosoma is divided into a pre-abdomen and an abdomen. Each pre-abdomen segment has both a pair of appendages and on the tergites, leaf-shaped tergopleurae, although somite 14 and all of the abdominal somites lack appendages. The first pre-abdominal somite has a large, flap-like exopod. The abdominal somites have fused tergites and sternites forming ring-shaped structures, alongside two pairs of spines derived from the tergopleurae. Under the 11th tergite, a small, symmetrical round structure is preserved, which may be an anal pouch. The telson as the end of the abdomen is roughly as long as the pre-abdomen, with a triangular shape.

== Classification ==
Setapedites shares similarities with Offacolus like the elongated chelicerae and limb arrangement, however the number of segments is closer to that of Dibasterium. Unusually, it also shares some features with Habelia like the anal pouch and structure of the opisthosomal tergites. Simplified cladogram after Lustri et al. (2024).

- Chelicerata
  - Pycnogonida (sea spiders)
  - Euchelicerata
    - - †Mollisonia
      - †Habelia
    - - †Offacolidae
        - †Dibasterium
        - - †Offacolus
          - - †Bunaia
            - †Setapedites
      - - †Weinbergina
        - - †Venustulus
          - - †Legrandella
            - - Xiphosurida
              - - †Limuloides
                - - †Pseudoniscus
                  - - †Chasmataspidida
                    - - †Eurypterida
                      - Arachnida

Simplified cladogram after Lerosey-Aubril et al. (2026).

- Pan‑Chelicerata
  - †Megacheira (paraphyletic)
  - - †Mollisoniida
    - - †Wisangocaris
      - †Habelia
      - - †Sanctacaris
        - †Utahcaris
      - chelicerae present
        - †Megachelicerax
        - - †Offacolus
          - - - †Setapedites
              - †Dibasterium
            - - †Weinbergina
              - - †Venustulus
                - - Pycnogonida (sea spiders)
                  - - Xiphosura (horseshoe crabs)
                    - - Arachnida
                      - †Eurypterida (sea scorpions)
