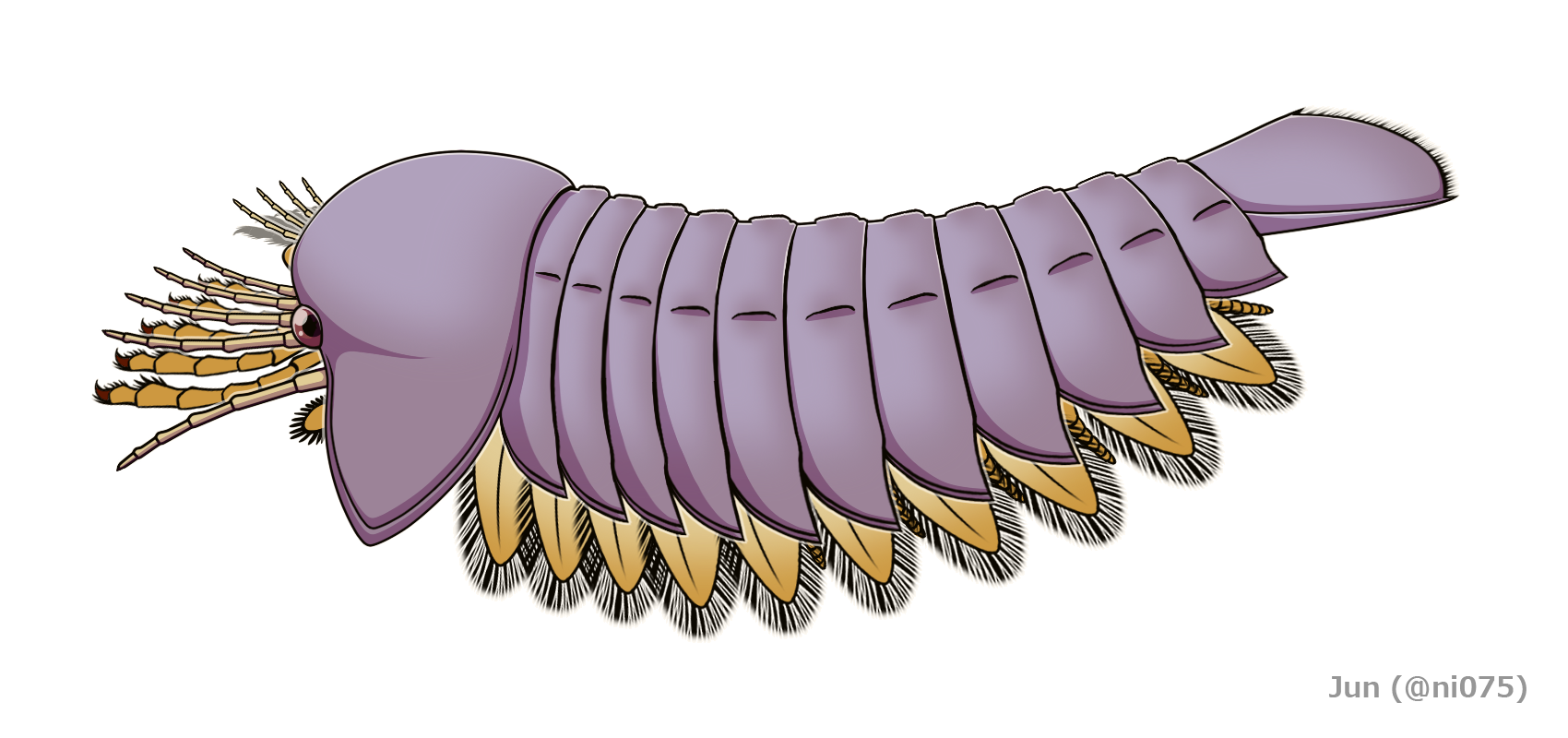
- Life restoration
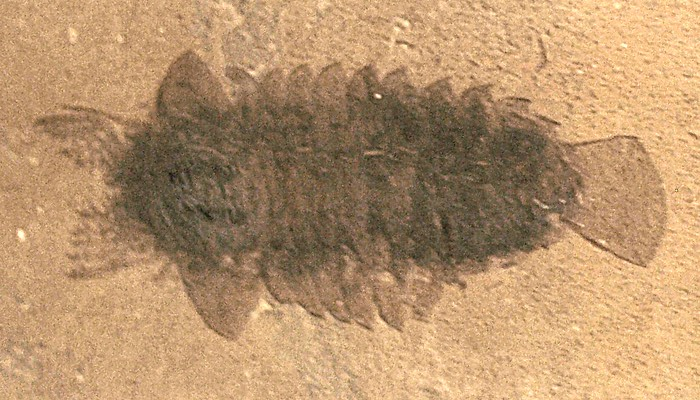
- Holotype specimen

Scientific classification
- Kingdom: Animalia
- Phylum: Arthropoda
- Subphylum: Chelicerata
- Order: †Habeliida
- Family: †Sanctacarididae
- Genus: †Sanctacaris; Briggs & Collins, 1988
- Species: †S. uncata

Binomial name
- †Sanctacaris uncata Briggs & Collins, 1988

= Sanctacaris =

Sanctacaris Temporal range: Middle Cambrian

Extinct genus of arthropods

Sanctacaris is a Middle Cambrian habeliid arthropod from the Burgess Shale of British Columbia. It is currently considered to be one of the oldest relatives of chelicerates.

== Discovery and etymology ==
Unlike most other Burgess forms, Sanctacaris is not present in Charles Walcott's 1909 quarry and was discovered at a different level by Desmond Collins in 1980–1981. The generic name "Sanctacaris " is a compound of the Latin words "sanctus" (saint or sacred) and "caris" (meaning crab or shrimp, a common suffix used in aquatic arthropods). The specific name of the type species "uncata " means "claws" in Latin and is named after the claw-shaped appendages on the head of this species. The name "saint claws" refers to Santa Claus, which was the field name used to refer to Sanctacaris.

== Description ==
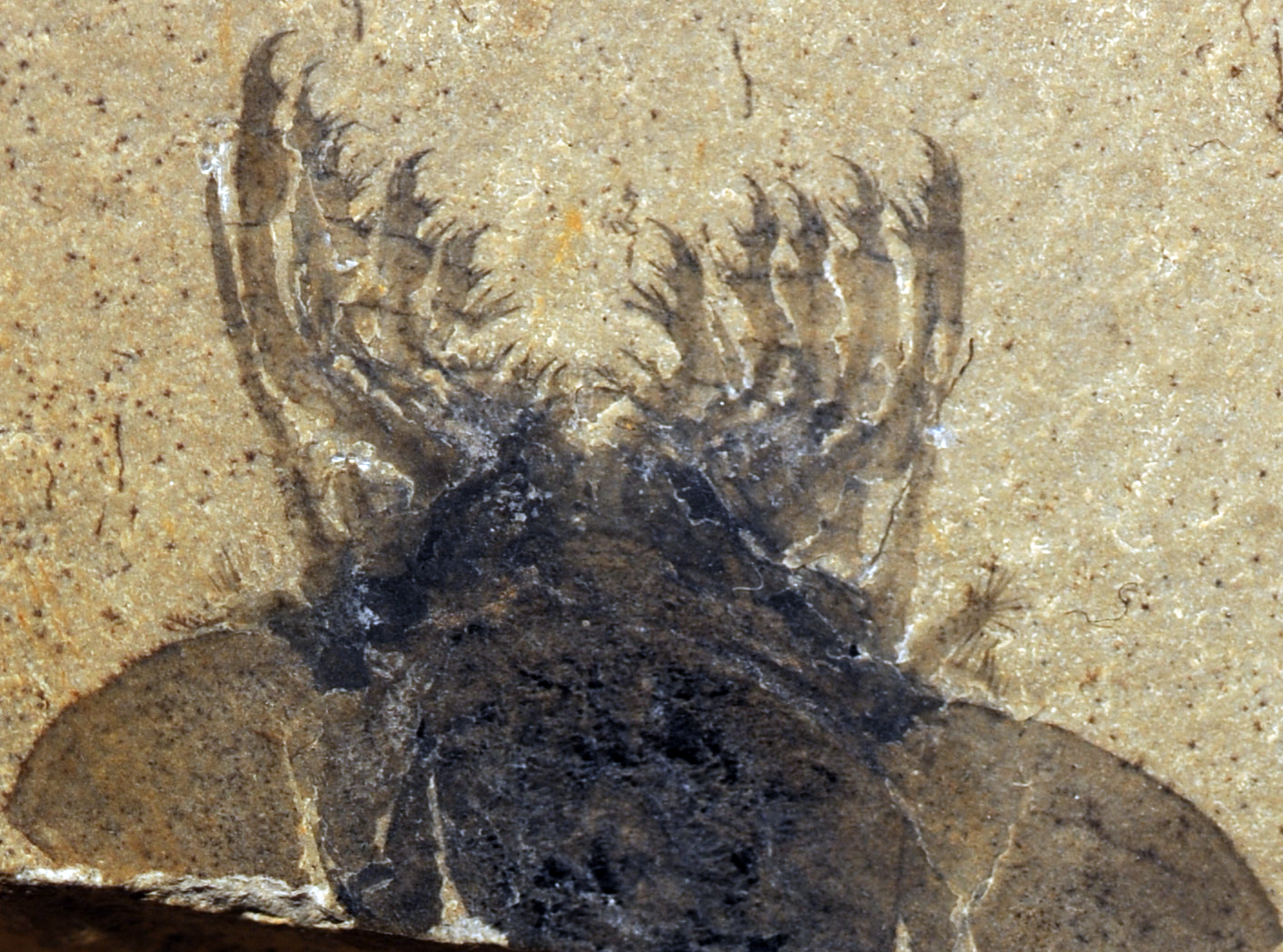
Close up view of the head of specimen ROM 43502, showing grasping spined endopod appendages

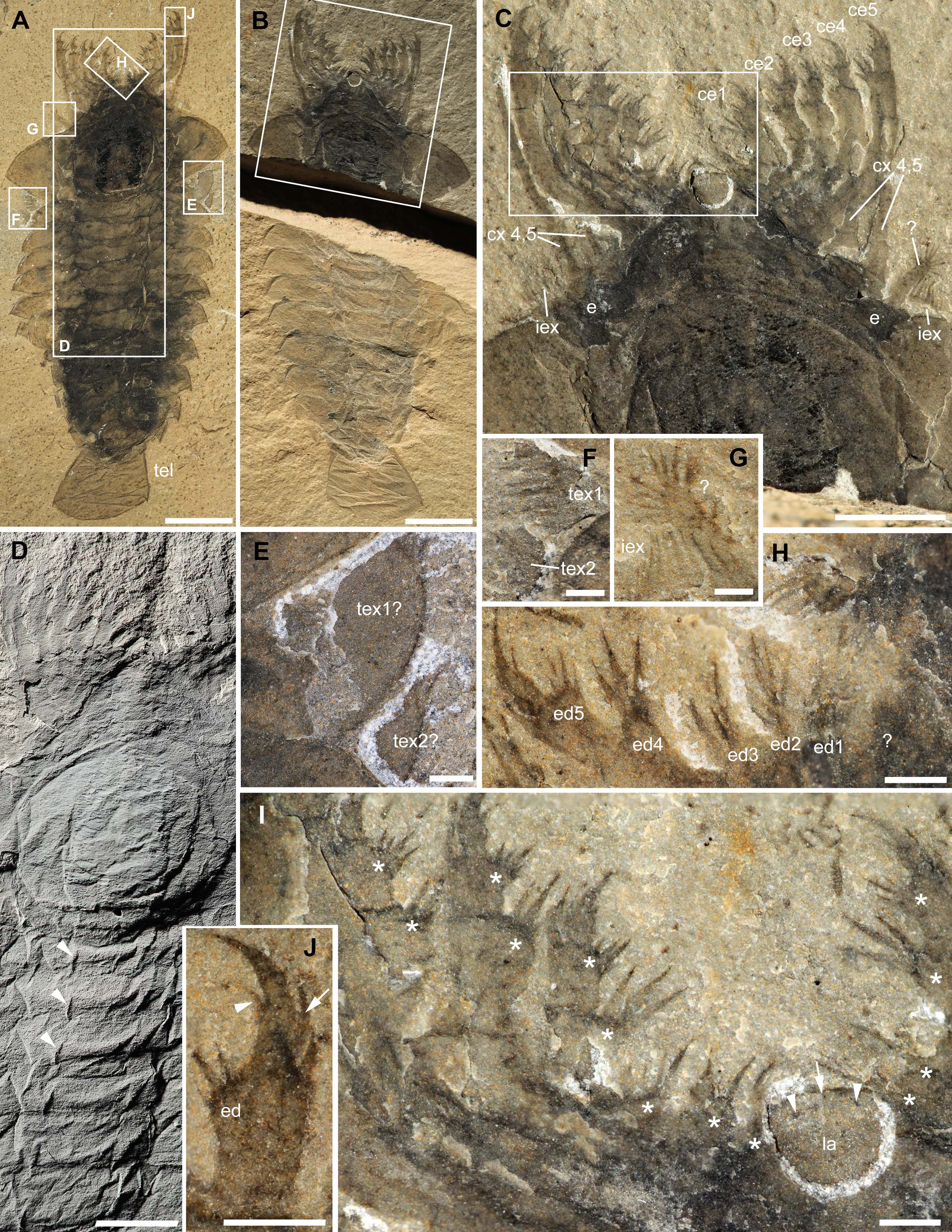
Various close-up views of various parts of specimen ROM 43502, as well as an image of the specimen coated in ammonium chloride powder (D, bottom left) to show partially preserved 3D relief

Sanctacaris specimens range from 4.6–9.3 centimetres (1.8–3.7 in) in length. The head bears a pair of eyes, as well as five pairs of biramous (two branched) appendages, the lower/inner branch of which (the endopods) comprise grasping appendages which bear spines primarily on their outer segments. Each of these appendages was likely made up of seven segments (podomeres), though in the frontmost pair the ones closest to the body are obscured. The base of the grasping head appendages probably bore gnathobases (spiny basal segments of arthropod limbs used for crushing and shredding prey), as in other habeliids, but these are obscured in current fossils.^{Additional file 1} The grasping head endopod appendages are each associated with a corresponding antenna-like exopod (outer branches). Based on Habelia, the head may have borne seven limb pairs in total, but these may be obscured in fossils by being under the head shield. One additional head limb pair is known, posterior to the first five, which is short but elongate, and bears a brush of setae (hair or bristle like structures) at its tip. While in the original description by Briggs and Collins 1988 this was suggested to be the sixth pair of head appendages, Aria and Caron 2017 suggest that it corresponded to the endopod of the seventh head limb pair known in the closely related Habelia.^{Additional file 1}

There are 11 body segments, with the former 10 each bearing a pair of biramous appendages, compossed of a flap-like exopod, which is fringed with elongate setae, and a reduced leg-like segmented endopod. There is a broad, flat paddle-like telson at the end of the body, which is fringed by short spines or setae on its posterior edge.

== Ecology ==
Like other habeliids, it has been suggested that Sanctacaris was a durophagous predator, feeding on hard shelled organisms. The spined head lower endopod appendages were likely used to grasp prey, while the upper head exopods had a sensory function similar to antennae. It probably lived near the seafloor but was likely an active swimmer, using the flap-like exopods of the trunk limbs for propulsion through the water (using a metachronal rhythm to synchronise the beating strokes) and respiration, while the paddle-like telson was used for steering.

== Affinities ==
In its original describing study, it was regarded as an early relative of chelicerates, a group which includes horseshoe crabs, sea spiders and arachnids like spiders and scorpions, although subsequent phylogenetic studies have not always supported this conclusion. Its chelicerate affinities have regained support in later studies, alongside the reassignment of Habelia optata as a sanctacaridid-related basal chelicerate. It has been placed as a member of the extinct family Sanctacarididae alongside Wisangocaris and Utahcaris as part of the order Habeliida along with Habelia.

Cladogram of Pan-Chelicerata after Lerosey-Aubril & Ortega-Hernández, 2026. Orange bar denotes members of Megacheira, while red denotes members of Habeliida.

- - Pan‑Chelicerata
    - - †Jianfengia
      - †Sklerolibyon
    - - †Fortiforceps
      - †Yohoia
      - - †Haikoucaris
        - †Leanchoiliidae
      - - †Mollisoniida
        - - †Wisangocaris
          - †Habelia
          - - †Sanctacaris
            - †Utahcaris
          - chelicerae present
            - †Megachelicerax
            - - †Offacolus
              - - - †Setapedites
                  - †Dibasterium
                - - †Weinbergina
                  - - †Venustulus
                    - - Pycnogonida (sea spiders)
                      - - Xiphosura (horseshoe crabs)
                        - - Arachnida
                          - †Eurypterida (sea scorpions)

== See also ==
- Paleobiota of the Burgess Shale
