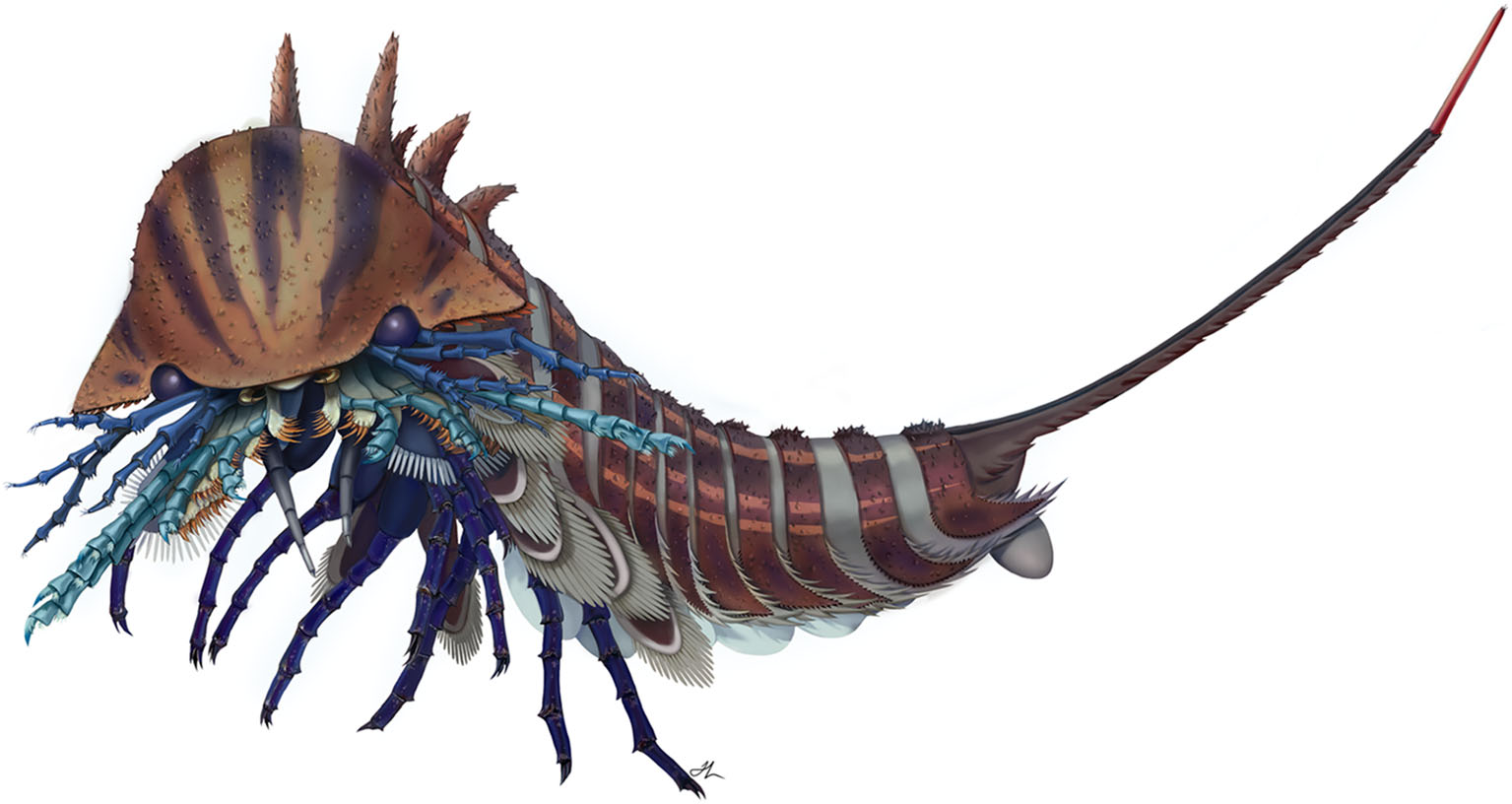
- Habelia
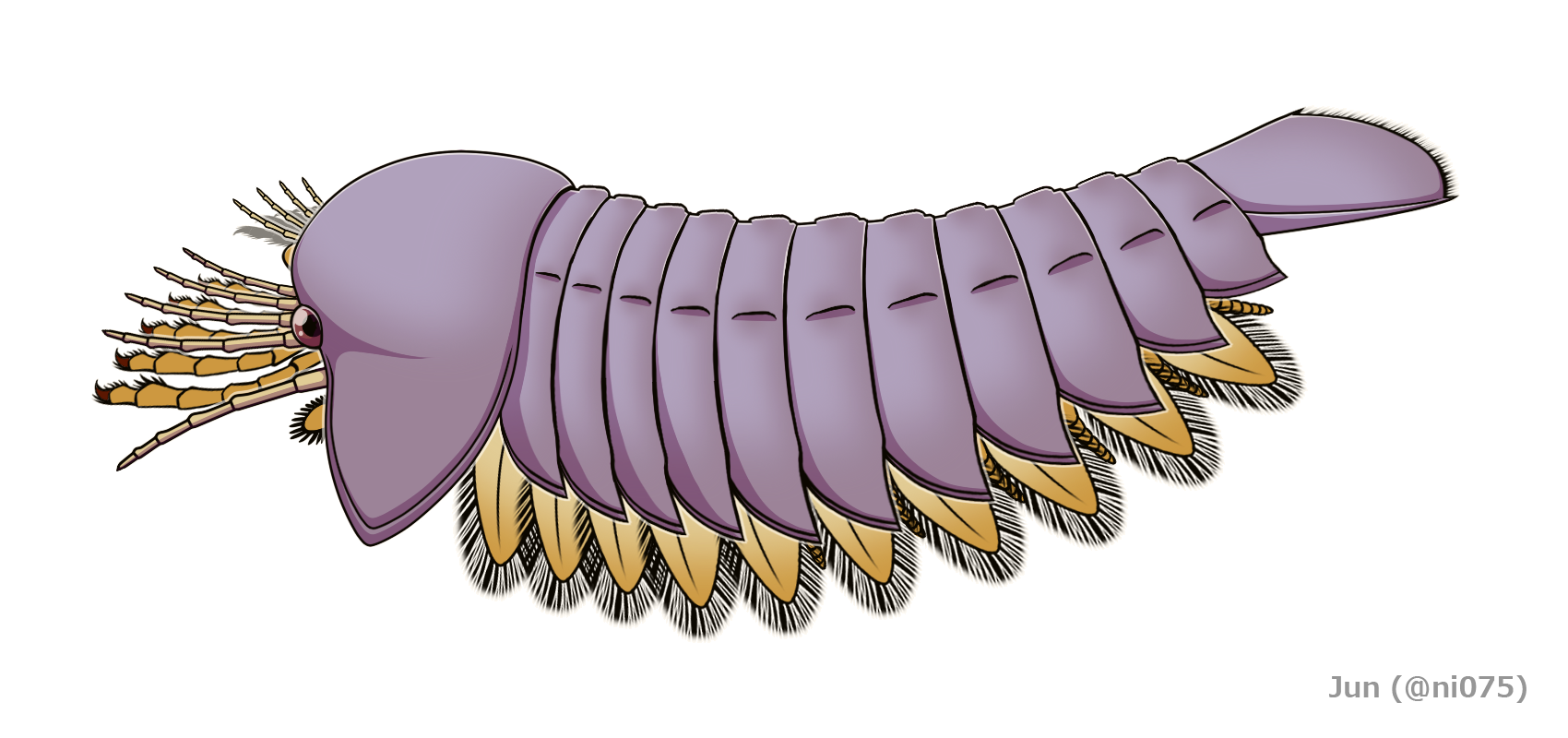
- Sanctacaris

Scientific classification
- Kingdom: Animalia
- Phylum: Arthropoda
- Subphylum: Chelicerata
- Order: †Habeliida; Aria and Caron, 2017

Families
- †Habeliidae; †Habelia; †Sanctacarididae; †Sanctacaris; †Utahcaris; †Wisangocaris; †Messorocaris?; †Dicranocaris?; †Nettapezoura?

= Habeliida =

Habeliida Temporal range: Middle Cambrian–Miaolingian

Extinct order of Cambrian arthropods

Habeliida is an order of extinct arthropods that existed during the middle Cambrian. They are thought to be some of the oldest members of the chelicerate lineage.

== Description ==
External videos
- Animated 3D model of Habelia moving its gnathobases
- Animated turntable rotation of 3D model of Habelia

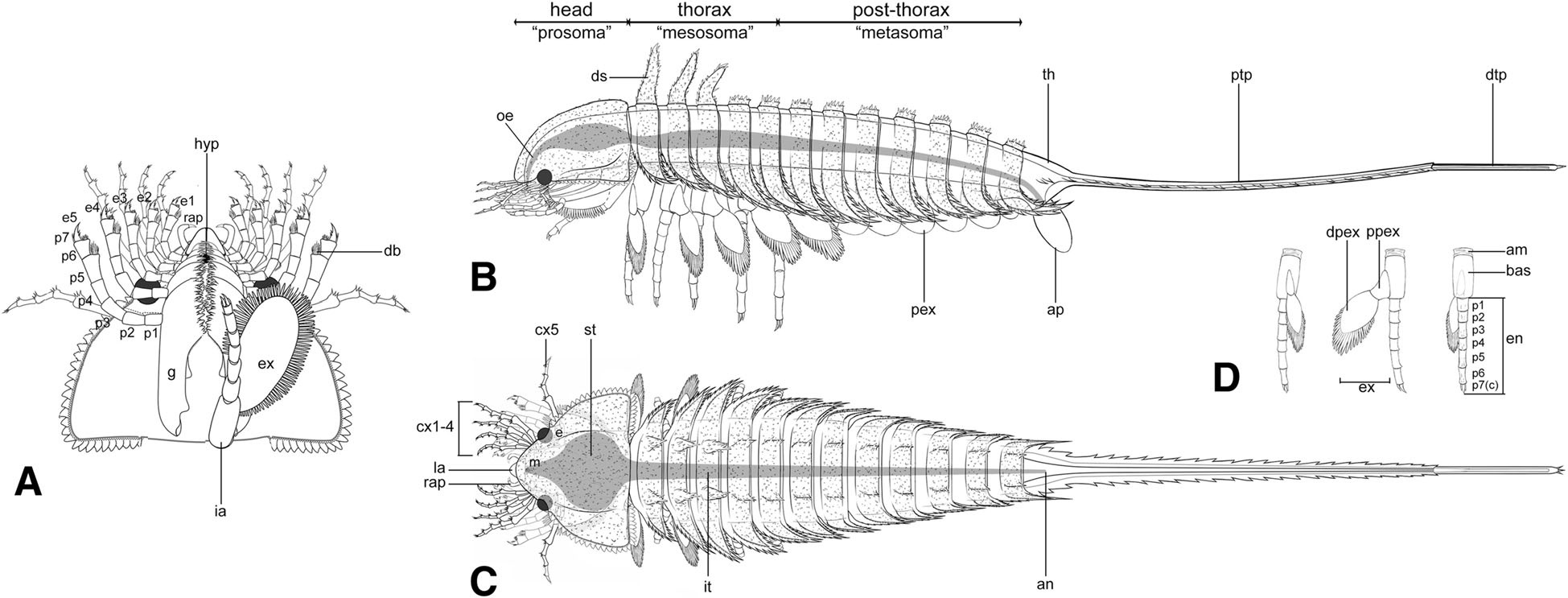
Diagrammatic reconstruction of Habelia. Key g=gnathobase en=endopod, ex=exopod cx = head exopod e1-5 = head endopods

Members of Habeliida are characterized by a numbers of features. These include: bulging head shields, which have notches to accommodate a pair of compound eyes, and triangular extensions outward to the sides. Attached to the head are 5 pairs of segmented, thin upper antennae-like exopods (upper limb branches), along with a reduced first appendage at least in Habelia, followed by 5 pairs of seven-segmented spined endopod (lower branch) grasping appendages, which are attached to basal segments (basipods), that increase in size posteriorly and are gnathobasic, that is modified to have inward-facing spines. Along the body run limbs with paddle-shaped exopods which are fringed by narrow lamellae. The body ends with a telson, which is either elongate and spine like (Habelia) or paddle-shaped (Sanctacarididae).

== Ecology ==
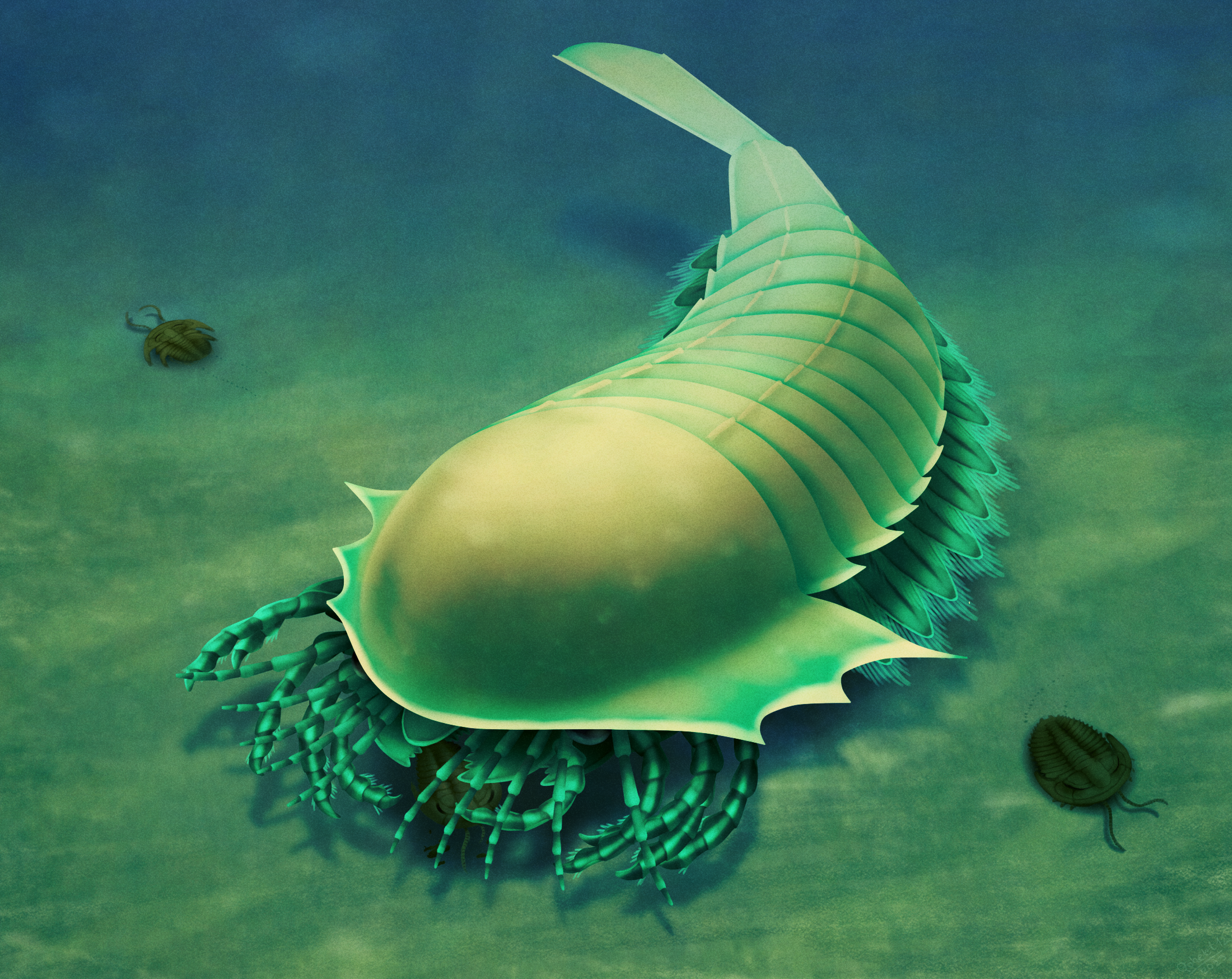
Restoration of Wisangocaris feeding on trilobites, as inferred from stomach contents

Habeliids were likely predatory, using the upper exopod head appendages as sensory organs, while using the lower spined head endopods to grasp prey. They are thought to have been durophagous, with the robust gnathobases (spined basal sections of limbs) used to shred hard-shelled organisms. Remains of trilobites have been found as stomach contents in Wisangocaris.

== Taxonomy ==
It is divided into two families, Habeliidae (monotypic, containing only Habelia), and Sanctacarididae (containing Sanctacaris, Utahcaris and Wisangocaris) Messorocaris has been suggested to be part of the order in some studies, but this is uncertain. They are suggested to be stem-group chelicerates, though they lack the chelicerae present in true chelicerates. They may be the ancestral group from which modern chelicerates emerged:

Cladogram after O’Flynn et al, 2023:

- Total group Arthropoda
  - "Gilled lobopodians" (Pambdelurion, Kerygmachela)
  - - Opabinia
    - - Radiodonta (e.g Anomalocaris)
      - Deuteropoda
        - - Kylinxia
          - Fengzhengia
        - - - Kiisortoqia
            - Bushizheia
          - - Megacheira
            - - Habeliida
              - - Mollisonia
                - Chelicerata (horseshoe crabs, sea spiders, arachnids, etc)
          - - - "Great appendage bivalved forms" (Occacaris, Forfexicaris)
              - Isoxyida
            - - Artiopoda (including Trilobita)
              - Mandibulata
                - Fuxianhuiida
                - - Myriapoda (millipedes, centipedes, etc)
                  - - Hymenocarina
                    - Pancrustacea (crustaceans, insects, etc)

Cladogram after Lerosey-Aubril and Ortega-Hernández (2026):

- - Pan‑Chelicerata
    - - †Jianfengia
      - †Sklerolibyon
    - - †Fortiforceps
      - †Yohoia
      - - †Haikoucaris
        - †Leanchoiliidae
      - - †Mollisoniida
        - - †Wisangocaris
          - †Habelia
          - - †Sanctacaris
            - †Utahcaris
          - chelicerae present
            - †Megachelicerax
            - - †Offacolus
              - - - †Setapedites
                  - †Dibasterium
                - - †Weinbergina
                  - - †Venustulus
                    - - Pycnogonida (sea spiders)
                      - - Xiphosura (horseshoe crabs)
                        - - Arachnida
                          - †Eurypterida (sea scorpions)
