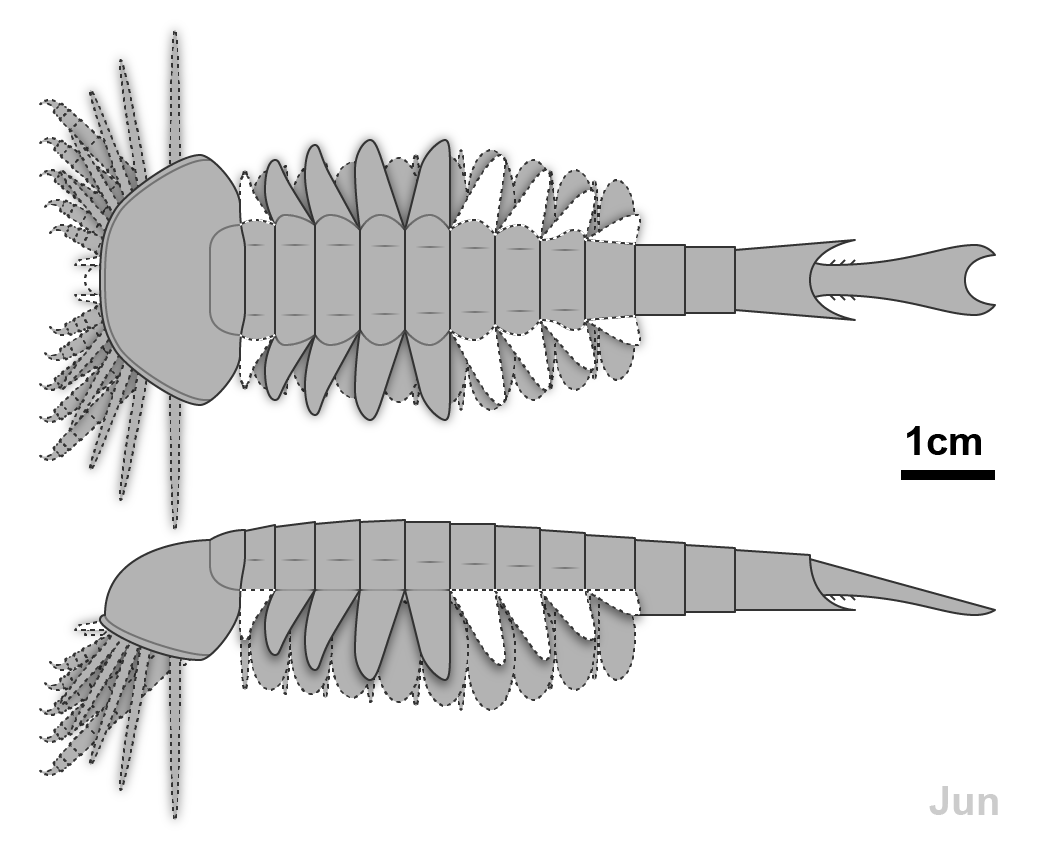
- Diagrammatic reconstruction as a habeliid

Scientific classification
- Kingdom: Animalia
- Phylum: Arthropoda
- Subphylum: Chelicerata
- Order: †Habeliida
- Genus: †Dicranocaris; Briggs et al., 2008

Type species
- Dicranocaris guntherorum Briggs et al., 2008

= Dicranocaris =

Dicranocaris Temporal range: Drumian, 507 Ma

Extinct genus of arthropods

Dicranocaris is an extinct genus of arthropod that lived in the Wheeler Shale formation of what is now modern day Utah during Drumian of the Cambrian period. The type and only species is Dicranocaris guntherorum.

== Morphology ==
Dicranocaris measured up to 10 cm in body length. The dorsal exoskeleton (tergite) consists of a semicircular cephalic (head) shield followed by a 12-segmented trunk. At least the second to fifth trunk segments possess tergopleurae (lateral extension of trunk tergite) and the last 3 segments are tube-like. A narrow telson (tail) expand and bifurcate distally.

Cephalic and trunk appendages are evident in some fossil materials, especially the laterally-preserved specimens. However, details are obscured by their poor preservation, and the identification of those lateral specimens as D. guntherorum is considered questionable as well.

== Classification ==
The taxonomic affinity of Dicranocaris is uncertain. Initially it was identified as an arachnomorph, later a possible megacheiran or a close relative of the co-described Nettapezoura. A material once though to be Dicranocaris was later described as Dytikosicula in 2015, but this might be synonymous with Dicranocaris after all. In 2020, another putative Dicranocaris specimen was later identified as Messorocaris. Recent studies suggest Dicranocaris is more closely related to Messorocaris and both are tentatively grouped under Habeliida (stem-group chelicerates).
