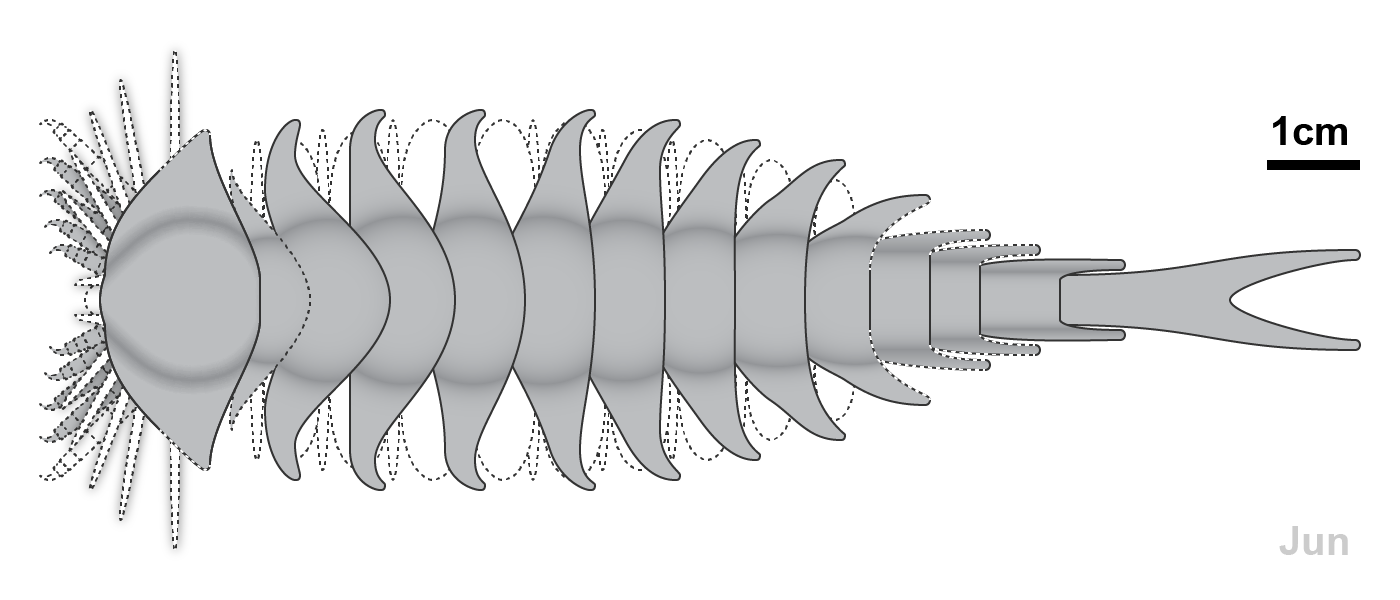
- Diagrammatic reconstruction as a habeliid

Scientific classification
- Kingdom: Animalia
- Phylum: Arthropoda
- Subphylum: Chelicerata
- Order: †Habeliida
- Genus: †Messorocaris; Lerosey-Aubril & Skabelund, 2018

Type species
- Messorocaris magna Lerosey-Aubril & Skabelund, 2018

= Messorocaris =

Messorocaris Temporal range: Drumian

Extinct genus of arthropods

Messorocaris is a monotypic genus of fossil arthropod. The only known species is Messorocaris magna from the Wheeler Formation of Utah, dating back to the Cambrian (Drumian) period.

== Morphology ==
As of 2020, Messorocaris known only by two specimens. The holotype UU 17042.01 preserved the cephalon (head) and anterior half of the trunk. The second specimen KUMIP312406 preserved only the trunk region, and was previously assigned to the similar-looking Dicranocaris. It is a large arthropod, with a trunk measured up to 12 cm long.

The body consists of a cephalic shield and a long, segmented trunk. All of the dorsal exoskeleton (tergite) have well-developed axial regions (vaulted middle sections) and tergopleurae (lateral extensions). The cephalic shield possess an anteriorly constricted axial region and wide pleural region, giving it a lens-shaped outline. The trunk has 12 body segments, divided by a series of overlapping tergites. The tergopleurae are somewhat reduced on the first segment, widely spaced and sickle-shaped at the second to fourth segments, increasingly recurved and narrower posteriorly from the fifth, and eventually become 3 pairs of posteriorly projecting spines at the last 3 segments. The telson (tail) elongated and narrow at the base, widen and bifurcate posteriorly.

Appendages are only known by the partially preserved cephalic endopods. The anteriorly clustered position, terminal claws and posteriorly increased size resembling those of a sanctacaridid.

== Taxonomy ==
Based on the aforementioned similarity, Messorocaris is tentatively classified as a member of Habeliida (Sanctacarididae in the original description), a group that increasingly evident to be a member of stem-group chelicerates. Within putative habeliids, Dicranocaris might be a close relative of Messorocaris, differ by its semicircular cephalic shield and non sickle-shaped tergopleurae. Outside of habeliids, another similar-looking arthropod is Falcatamacaris (identified as an artiopod), particularly its sickle-shaped tergopleurae, but distinct by multiple features such as flatten cephalon, abrupt change of width between tergite 8–9 and calcitic exoskeleton.
