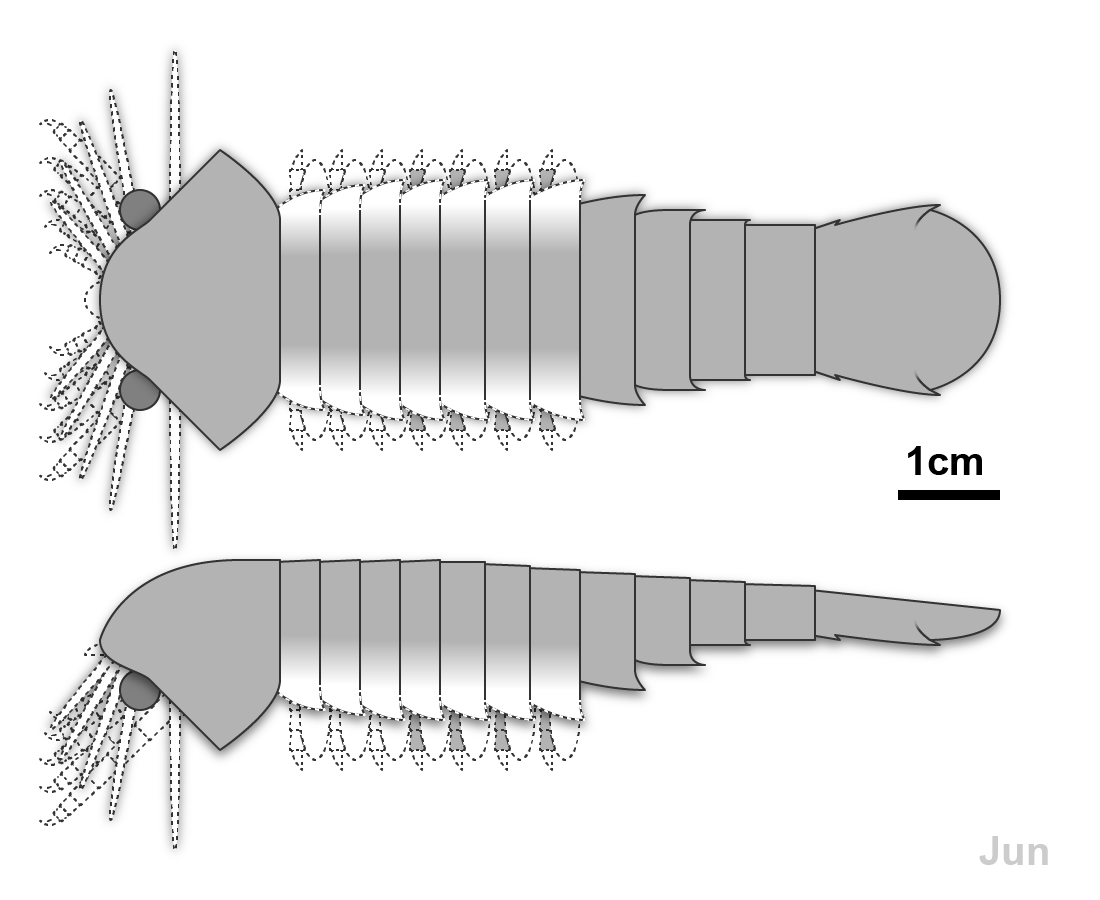
- Diagrammatic reconstruction

Scientific classification
- Kingdom: Animalia
- Phylum: Arthropoda
- Subphylum: Chelicerata
- Order: †Habeliida
- Family: †Sanctacarididae
- Genus: †Utahcaris; Morris & Robison, 1988

Type species
- Utahcaris orion Morris & Robison, 1988

= Utahcaris =

Utahcaris Temporal range: Wuliuan

Extinct genus of arthropods

Utahcaris is a monotypic genus of fossil arthropod. The only known species is Utahcaris orion from the Spence Shale of Utah, dating back to the Cambrian (Wuliuan) period.

== Morphology ==
Utahcaris is known only by two specimens, the holotype KUMIP 204785 from the original description and paratype KUMIP 204785 from the redescription in 2017. It measured up to 87 mm in body length.

The body consists of a cephalon (head) and an 11-segmented trunk, covered by a series of overlapping tergites (dorsal exoskeleton). The cephalic shield is bulbous and possess a pair of triangular tergopleurae (lateral extensions), as well as a pair of eyes under its anterolateral margin. The majority of trunk tergopleurae are not preserved, but the last two segments are clearly narrower than the rest. The trunk terminated by a wide, paddle-like telson (tail) that have 2 pairs of small lateral spines. Cephalic and trunk appendages are evident but poorly preserved.

== Paleoecology ==
Similar to other sanctacaridids, the large eyes, flat telson and biogenic gut content indicate Utahcaris is an active swimming durophagous predator.

== Classification ==
Utahcaris is a member of Sanctacarididae, a family which later grouped under the stem chelicerate order Habeliida. Utahcaris is distinguishable from other sanctacaridids (e.g. Sanctacaris, Wisangocaris) by the absence of paired carinae (ridges) on its trunk tergites.
