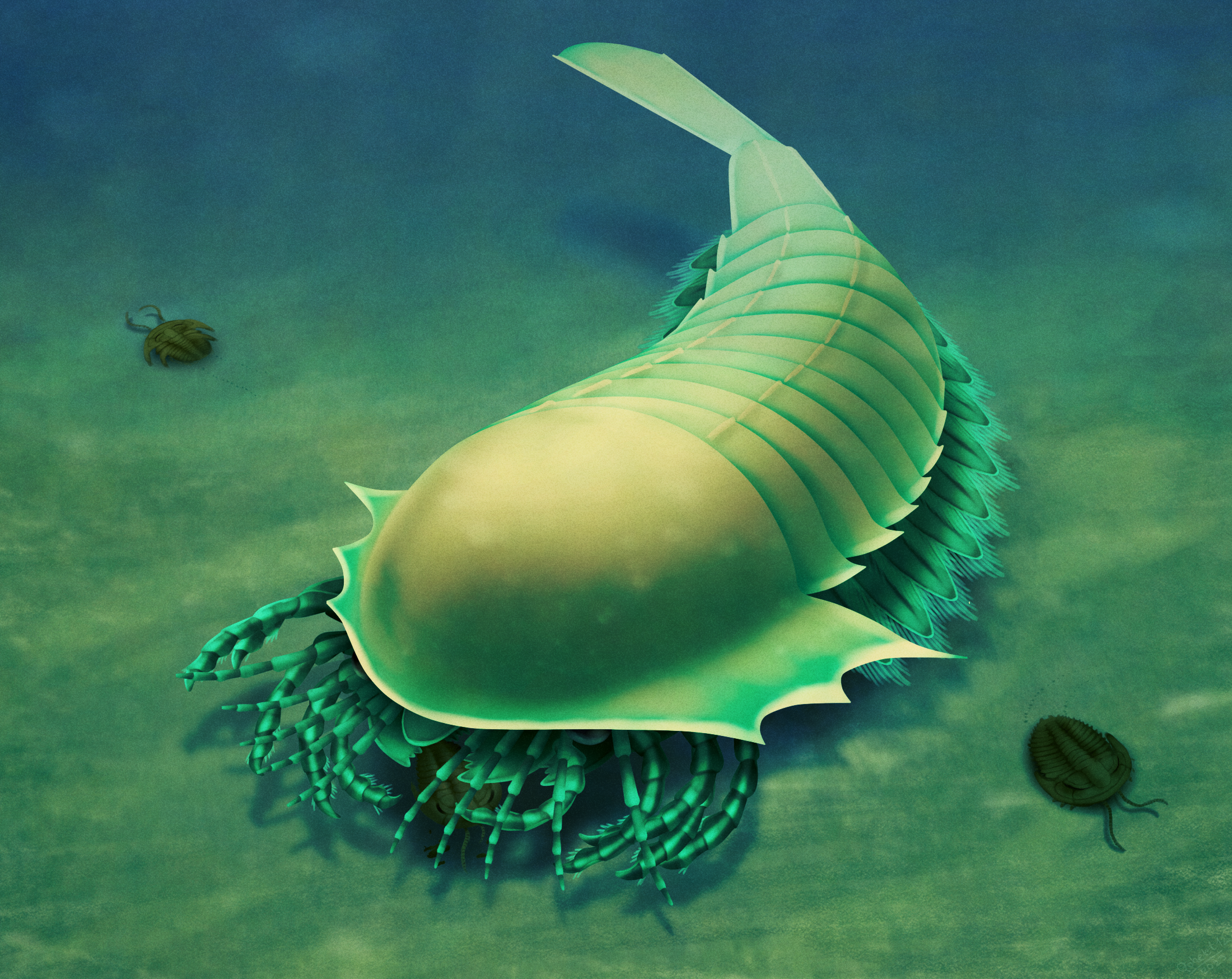
- Life restoration feeding on the trilobite Estaingia bilobata

Scientific classification
- Kingdom: Animalia
- Phylum: Arthropoda
- Subphylum: Chelicerata
- Order: †Habeliida
- Family: †Sanctacarididae
- Genus: †Wisangocaris
- Species: †W. barbarahardyae

Binomial name
- †Wisangocaris barbarahardyae Jago et al 2016

= Wisangocaris =

Wisangocaris Temporal range: Cambrian Stage 4

Extinct genus of arthropods

Wisangocaris is an extinct genus of Cambrian arthropod known from the Emu Bay Shale of Australia. Due to the fact that trilobite fragments have been found in its stomach, it was probably durophagous. It been placed in the family Sanctacarididae alongside Sanctacaris as stem-group chelicerates.
