= Gnathobase =

Anatomical feature of appendages of some arthropods for processing food items

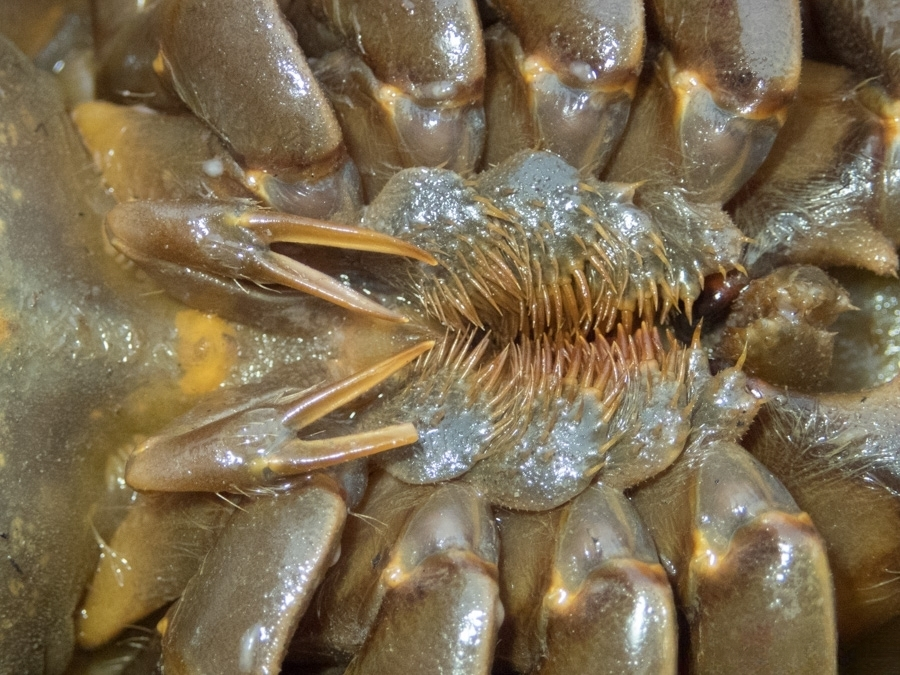
Gnathobases of a horseshoe crab, with the chelicerae on the left

Gnathobases (from Ancient Greek γνάθος (gnáthos) 'jaw' and βᾰ́σῐς (básis) 'base') are paired modified sections on the underside of the base of some arthropod limbs (specifically on the basipod/basipodite, the basalmost segment which attaches directly to the body), used for food processing. They typically feature hard sclerotised spines (endites), which serve a masticatory function such as crushing and shredding prey, and can also aid in transporting food towards the mouth.

Gnathobases are present in extant and extinct arthropods, though only horseshoe crabs today have a well developed series of gnathobases along their limbs.

== In Chelicerata ==
Chelicerates have gnathobases that function in conjunction with chelicerae and in some taxa with other structures.

=== Arachnida ===
In arachnids have similar structures usually present in the coxae of the pedipalps (hence they are called "gnathocoxae"). True gnathobases are absent in arachnids.

=== Eurypterida ===
In eurypterids both pedipalps and all walking legs (pairs of appendages II to VI) have the basipods with gnathobases that function together with the metastoma. This distribution occurs similarly in the related group Chasmataspidida.

=== Xiphosura ===
In xiphosurans including living horseshoe crabs, gnathobases are found on the basipods of the pedipalps and walking legs, similar to those of eurypterids. They function with chilaria (sg. chilarium), a pair of reduced appendages that prevent food from escaping.

=== Other chelicerates ===
External videos
- Animated 3D model of Habelia moving its gnathobases

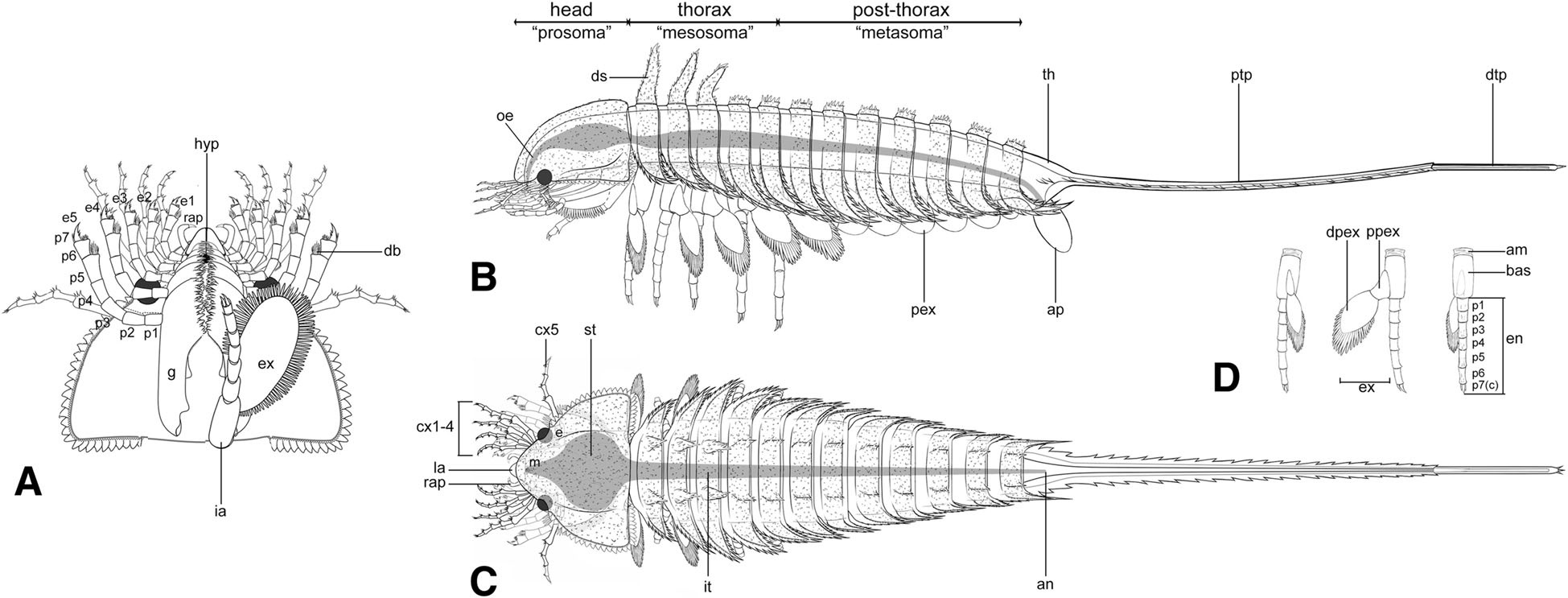
Diagram of the extinct Cambrian stem-chelicerate Habelia, showing the gnathobases (labeled g) on the underside of the head

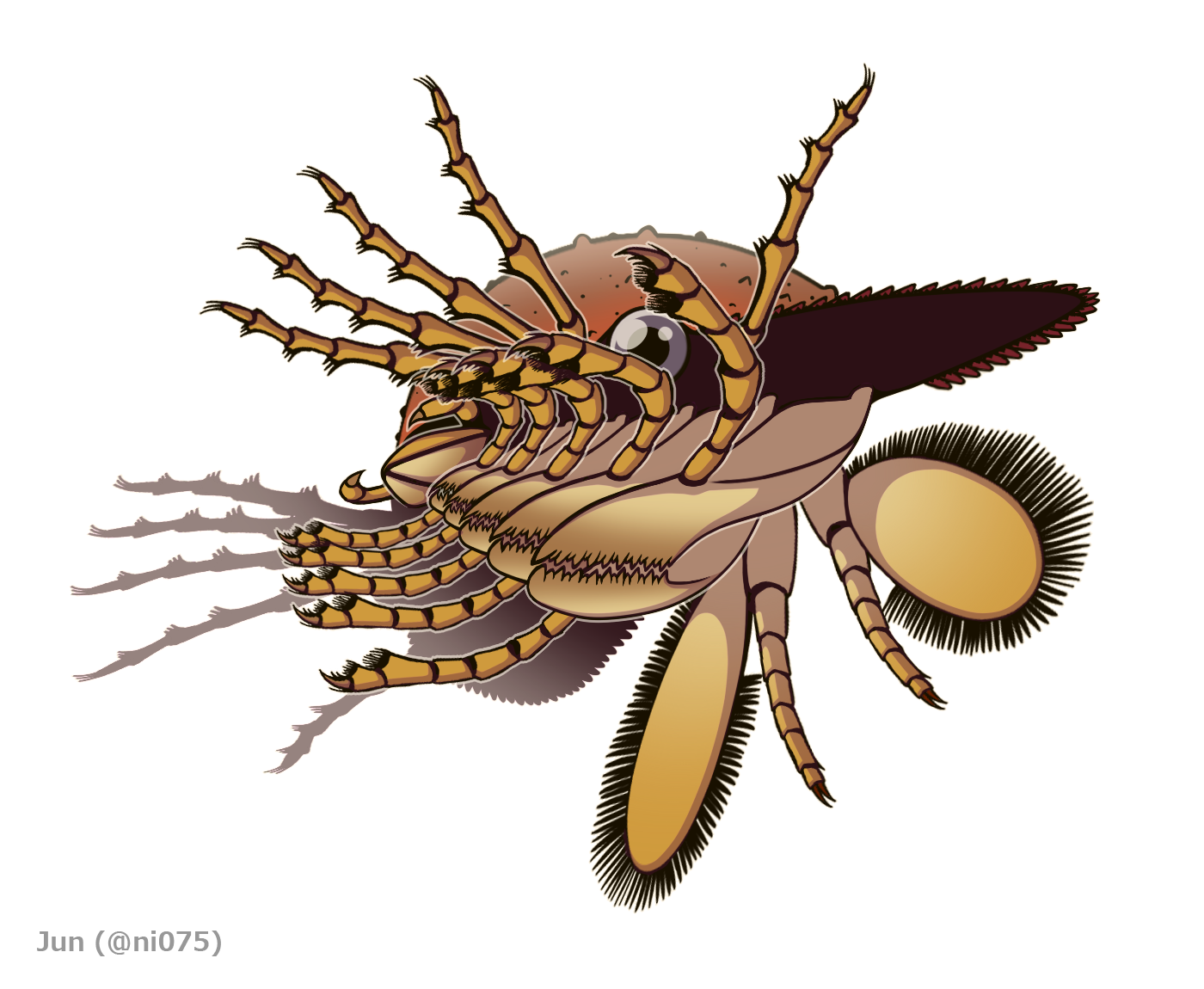
Restoration of the underside of the head of Habelia, prominently showing the gnathobases running along the midline

Gnathobases are also found in other groups of chelicerates, such as in the mandible-like basipods of Habelia and Mollisonia.

== Artiopoda including Trilobita ==
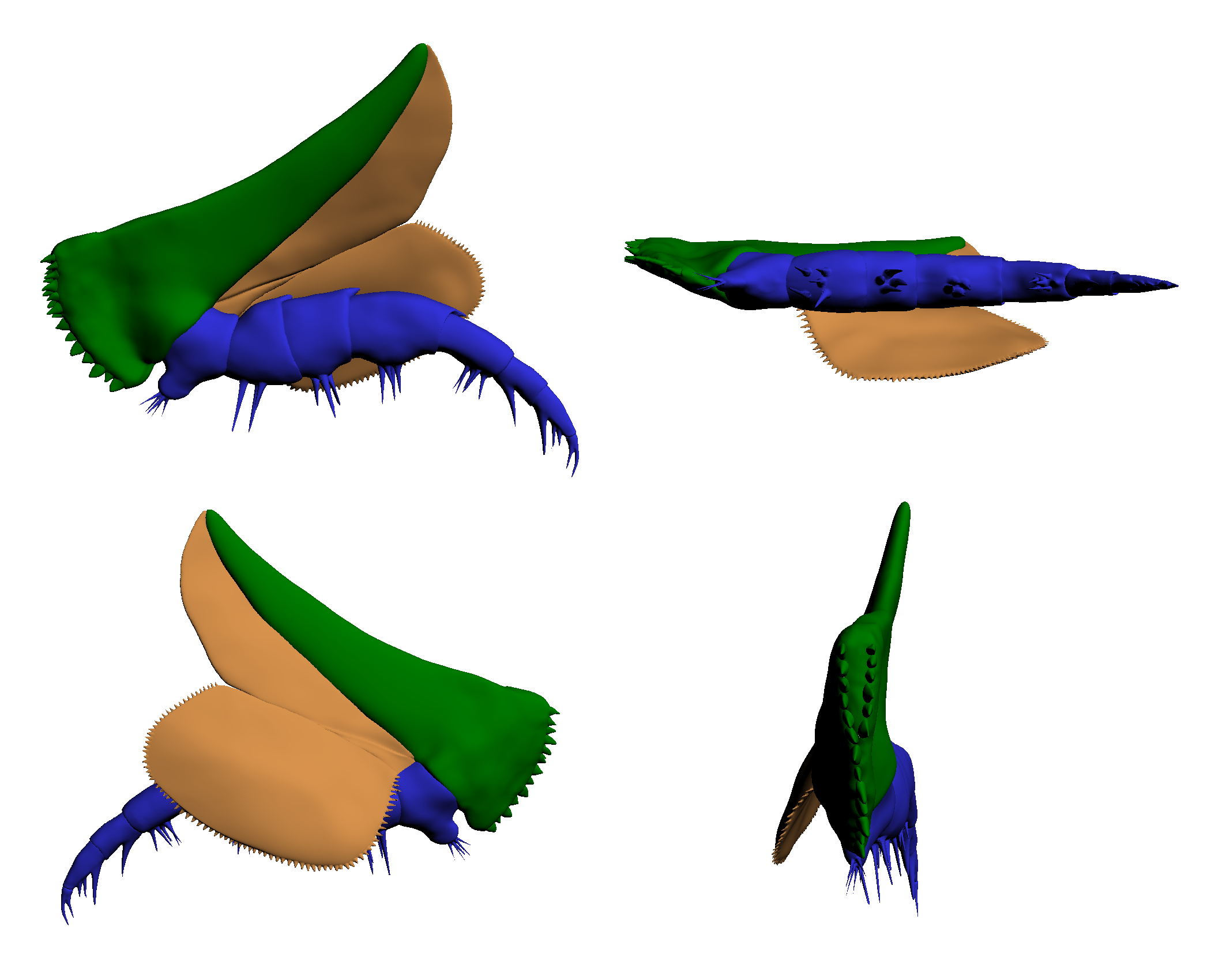
Reconstructed limb of extinct Cambrian artiopod Sidneyia inexpectans, showing spined gnathobase in green

Gnathobases are known to occur in Artiopoda, including in trilobites, the most well-known artiopod group, as well as others like Sidneyia.

== In Mandibulata ==
Mandibles, the eponymous appendages of the Mandibulata, may have originated from thoracic legs possessing gnathobasic endites.

=== Crustacea ===
Crustaceans including copepods have gnathobases on the mandible.

== See also ==
- Arthropod mouthparts
