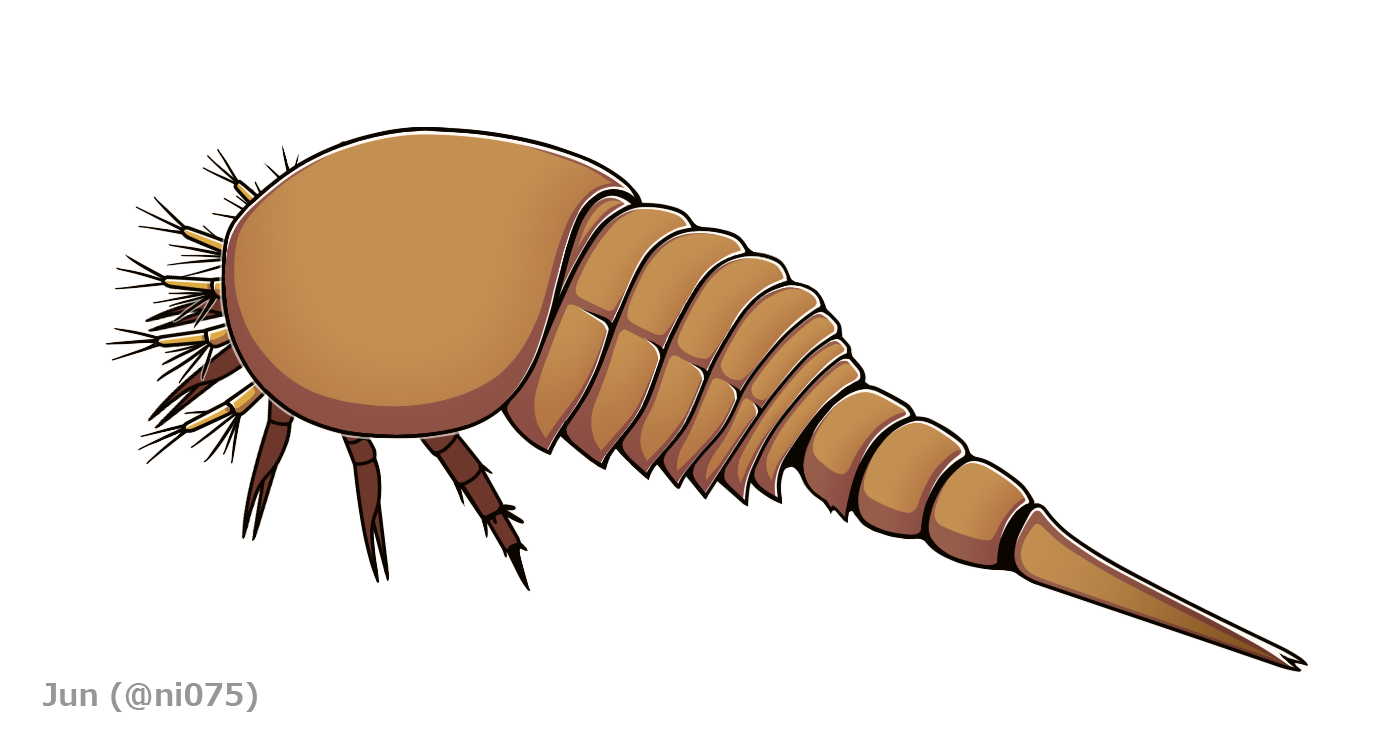
- Reconstruction of Dibasterium durgae

Scientific classification
- Kingdom: Animalia
- Phylum: Arthropoda
- Subphylum: Chelicerata
- Clade: Euchelicerata
- Genus: †Dibasterium; Briggs et al., 2012

Type species
- †Dibasterium durgae Briggs et al., 2012

= Dibasterium =

Dibasterium Temporal range: Homerian, 425 Ma

Extinct genus of arthropods

Dibasterium is an extinct genus of euchelicerate, a group of chelicerate arthropods. Fossils of the single and type species, D. durgae, have been discovered in the Coalbrookdale Formation of the Middle Silurian period (Homerian age) in Herefordshire, England (in the United Kingdom). The name of the genus is derived from the Latin words dibamos ("on two legs") and mysterium ("mystery"), meaning "mystery on two legs" and referring to its prosomal (of the head) limbs. The species name durgae comes from Durga, a Hindu goddess with many arms.
