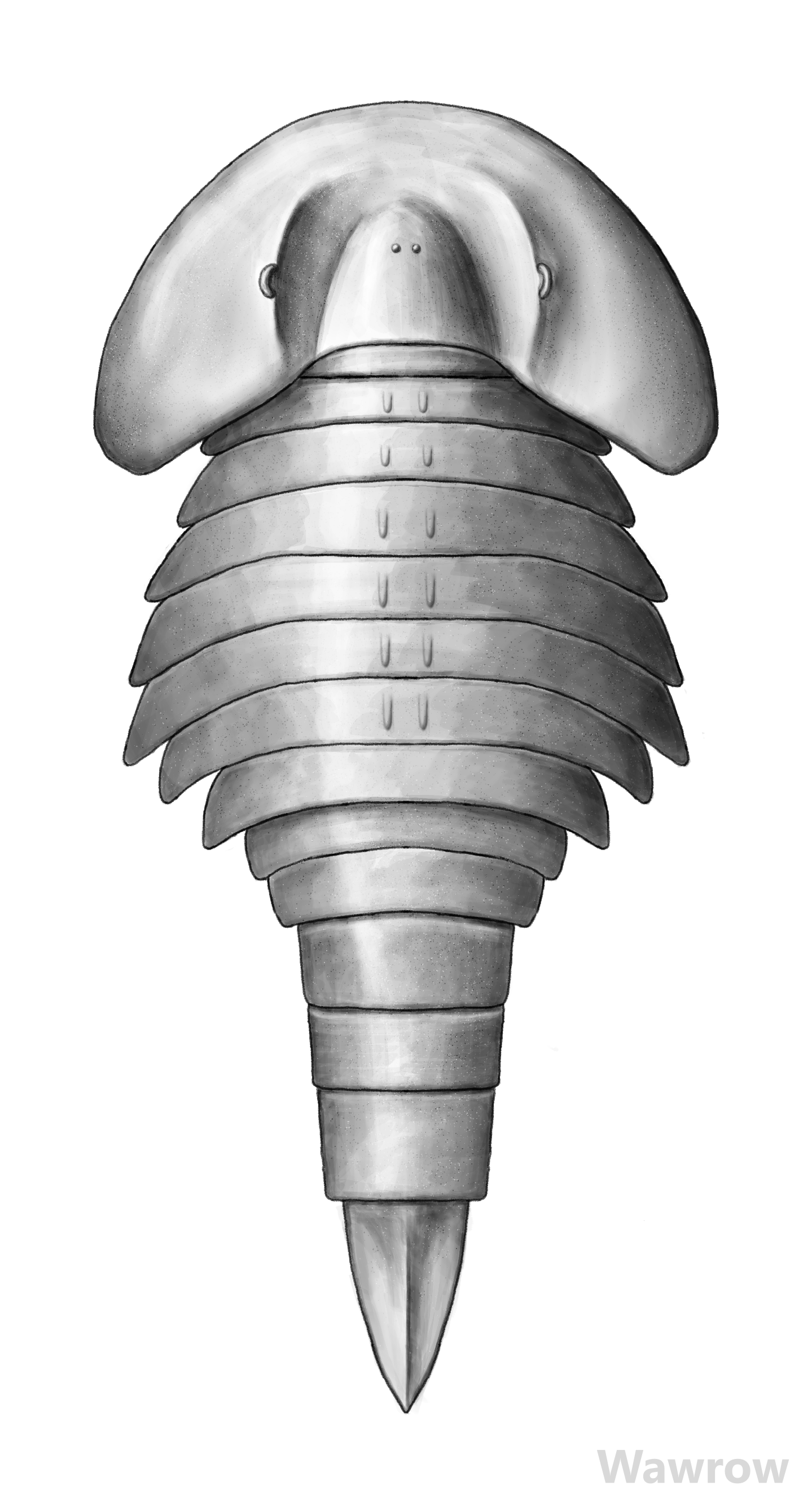
- Reconstruction of W. youngae (The limbs are omitted due to a lack of material)

Scientific classification
- Kingdom: Animalia
- Phylum: Arthropoda
- Subphylum: Chelicerata
- Clade: Planaterga
- Clade: Dekatriata
- Genus: †Winneshiekia; Lamsdell et al., 2015
- Species: †W. youngae

Binomial name
- †Winneshiekia youngae Lamsdell et al., 2015

= Winneshiekia =

Winneshiekia Temporal range: Darriwilian, 467.3–458.4 Ma

Extinct genus of arthropods

Winneshiekia is an extinct genus of dekatriatan, a clade of chelicerate arthropods. Fossils of the single and type species, W. youngae, have been discovered in deposits of the Middle Ordovician period (Darriwilian epoch) in Iowa, in the United States. The name of the genus is derived from the Winneshiek Shale, the formation in which it was discovered. The species name youngae honors Jean N. Young, an American geologist who contributed greatly to the discovery of the Winneshiek Shale. Winneshiekia is also likely one of the oldest euchelicerates.

== Description ==
Winneshiekia is roughly 6 cm long at largest, and known from four specimens. The body is divided into a prosoma and opisthosoma. The opisthosoma is wide with its front and back tergites (segments) changing in size. These tergites are tipped with angular epimera (regions outward from the limb), with articulating sections at their front. Meanwhile, the opisthosoma is thinner and lacks epimera. Apodemes (internal extensions of the exoskeleton) are preserved on the second to seventh segments of one fossil, alongside a dark central stain which may be the gut. Its exoskeleton was also covered in small tubercles (bumps) resulting in a granular appearance. The carapace is incomplete, but was likely rounded in life with broad pleurae. A crescent-shaped eye is preserved on this carapace, with smaller ocelli near its middle. Unfortunately no specimen preserves limbs, meaning it is unknown whether Winneshiekia had chasmataspidid-like paddles or if its limbs were all relatively similar like xiphosurans. A later paper discussing small carbonaceous fossils (SCFs) of gnathobases from Winneshiek recovered the bearer of these as a euchelicerate, although the hypothetical gnathobase-bearer was found to be orders of magnitude smaller at less than a millimetre long. While this would seem to preclude Winneshiekia from being the bearer of the gnathobases, as its early life stages are unknown they may belong to hatchlings of the genus.

== Affinity ==
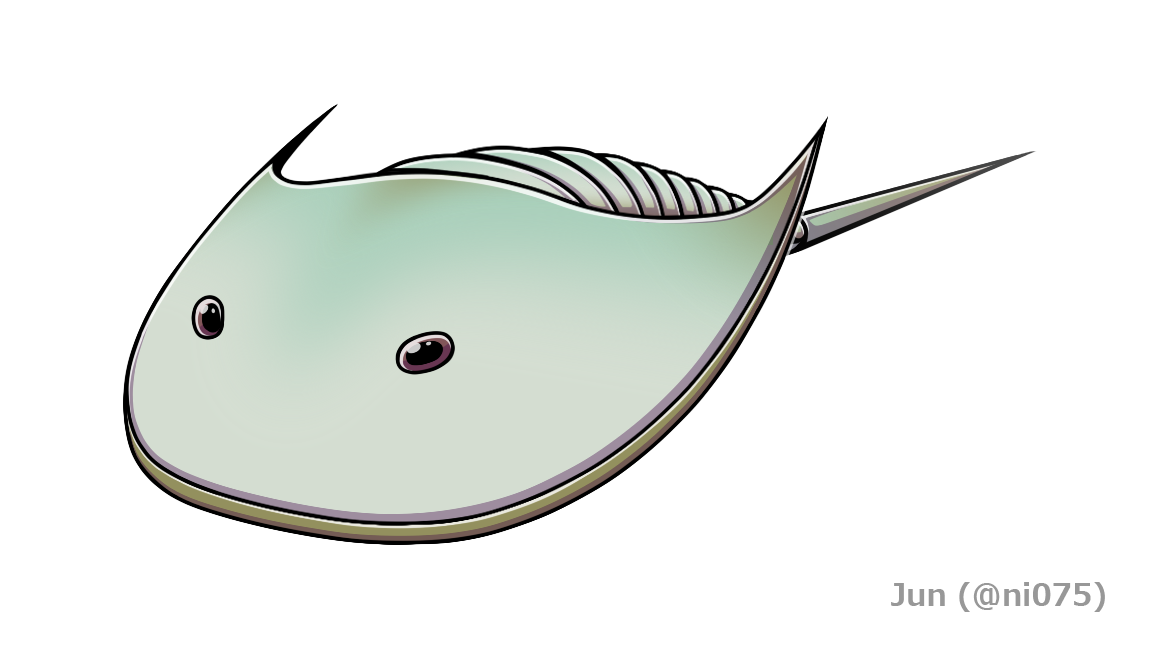
Houia yueya, another basal dekatriatan

While Winneshiekia resembles the Cambrian aglaspidids, the median ocelli and lack of a mineralised exoskeleton exclude it from this clade, while the carapace also excludes it from the eurypterids. A phylogenetic analysis recovered it as the basalmost dekatriatan, even more basal than the more xiphosuran-like Houia.
