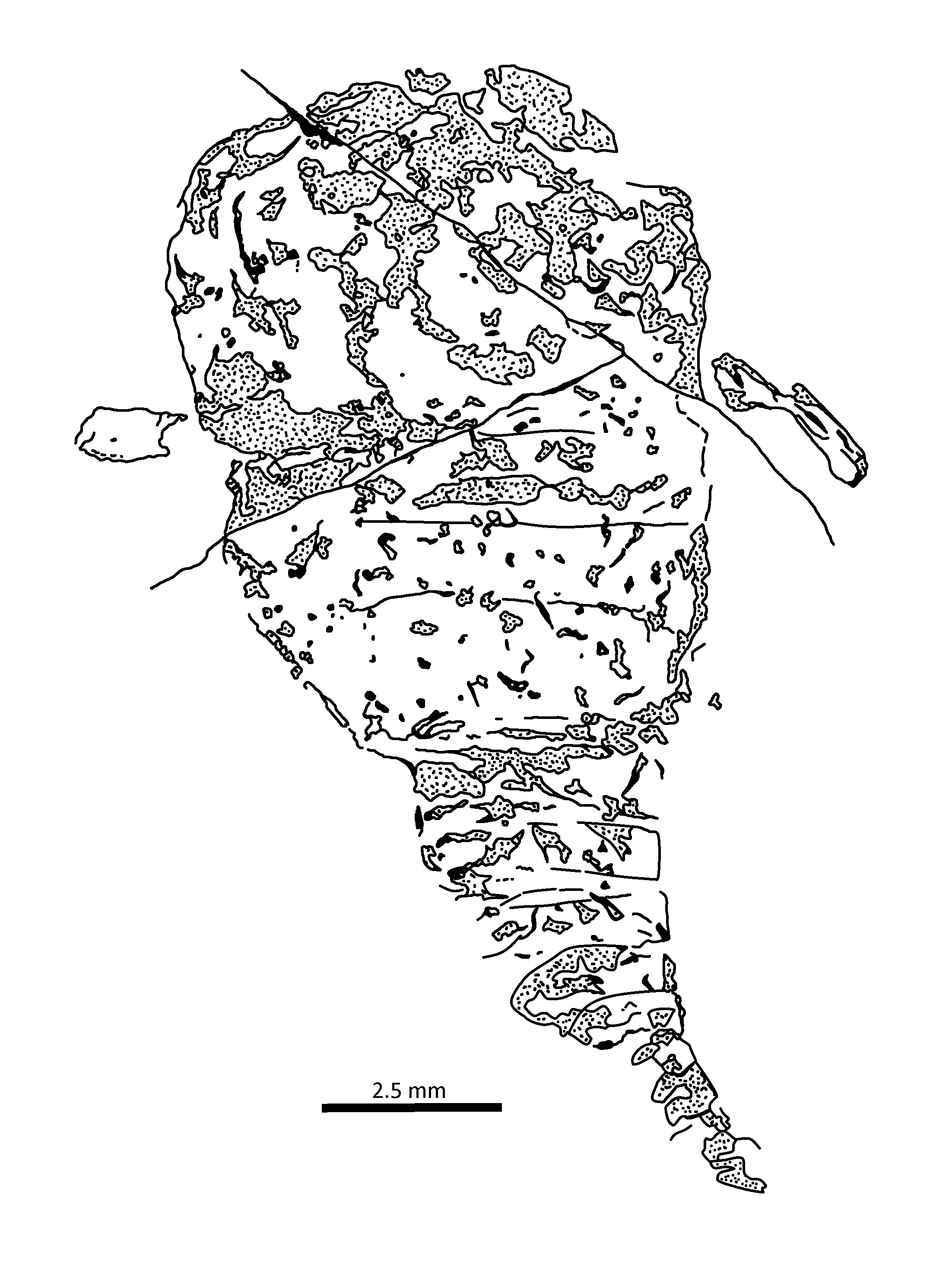
- Camera lucida drawing of the holotype and only known specimen of F. mitchelli

Scientific classification
- Kingdom: Animalia
- Phylum: Arthropoda
- Subphylum: Chelicerata
- Clade: Dekatriata
- Order: †Chasmataspidida
- Family: †Diploaspididae
- Genus: †Forfarella; Dunlop, Anderson & Braddy, 1999

Type species
- †Forfarella mitchelli Dunlop, Anderson & Braddy, 1999

= Forfarella =

Forfarella Temporal range: Early Devonian, 416–393.3 Ma

Extinct genus of arthropods

Forfarella is a genus of chasmataspidid, a group of extinct aquatic arthropods. Fossils have been discovered in deposits of the Early Devonian period. The single and type species, F. mitchelli, is known from one only specimen found in Scotland, in the United Kingdom. Known as BMNH In 60023, it is poorly preserved and its type locality is uncertain, although it might be the Kelly Den stream section near the village of Arbirlot.

Forfarella was very small, only reaching 1.7 centimetres (0.67 inches) of length. It had a nearly rectangular head, with its eyes being unknown but possibly represented by a tubercle in the fossil. Its abdomen consisted of an almost trapezoidal preabdomen and a long, tapering postabdomen. The telson (the posteriormost division of the body) is not preserved, but it was probably short. The appendages, known only from a few fragments, possibly had swimming paddles that Forfarella used to swim actively.

The fossil of Forfarella was purchased in 1893 from a fossil collection. It was sent to the Natural History Museum in London. Decades later, in 1962, a paleontologist studied it and determined that it was a chasmataspidid, naming it Forfarella mitchelli. However, the paleontologist never formally published his findings. It would not be until 1999 when a group of three other paleontologists formally described Forfarella. Forming part of the family Diploaspididae, it was similar to Diploaspis and other Devonian genera, although it is speculated that Forfarella may have existed during the Silurian as well. It was a lacustrine animal, meaning that it lived in lakes.

== Description ==
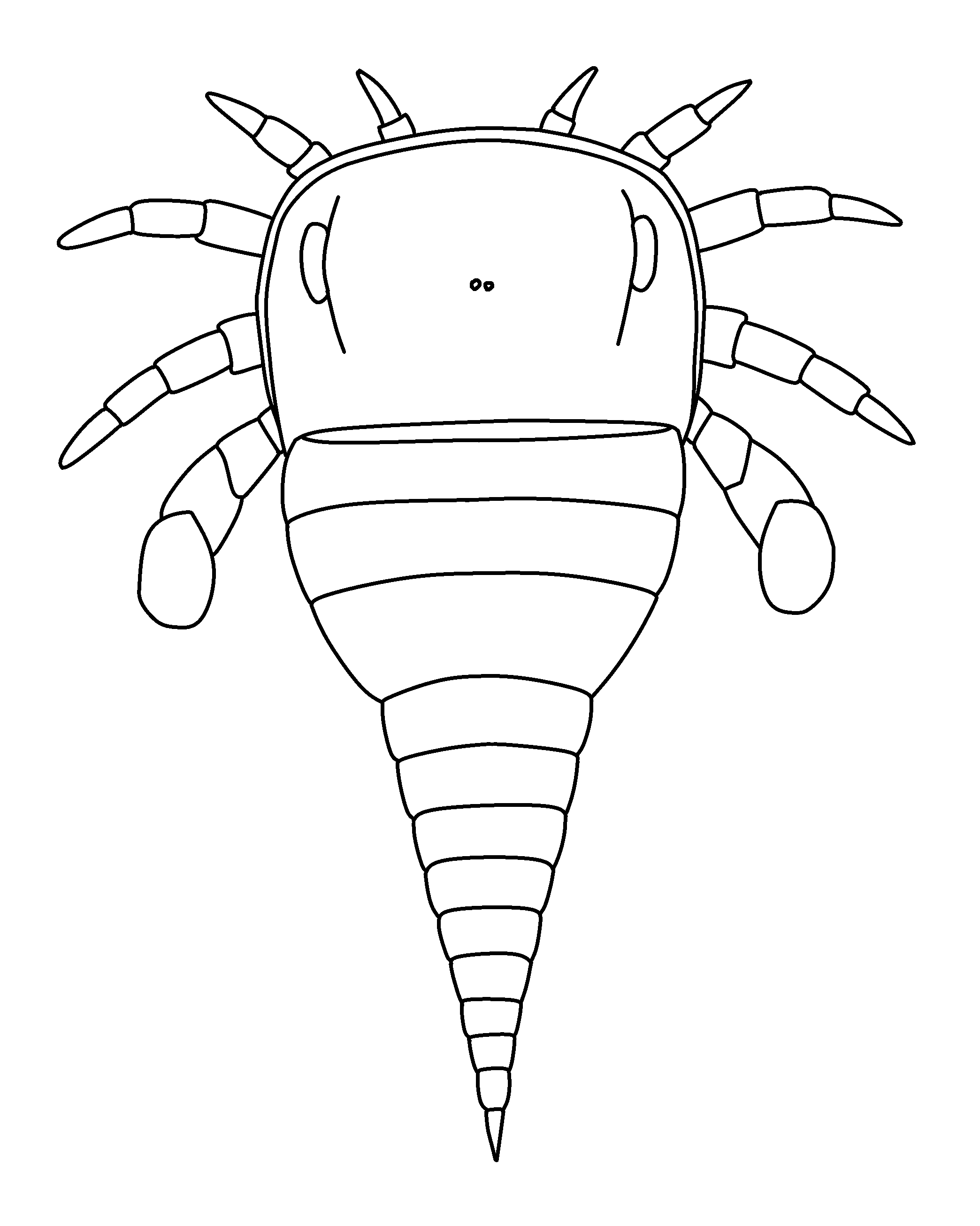
Restoration of F. mitchelli. The appendages, details of the carapace and telson are based on better preserved chasmataspidids or on xiphosurans.

Like other chasmataspidids, F. mitchelli was a small arthropod, with the size of the only known specimen estimated at only 1.7 centimetres (0.67 inches) in length.

Its carapace (dorsal plate of the head) was wide and subrectangular (almost rectangular). It was broader than long; 0.76 cm (0.30 in) wide and 0.52 cm (0.20 in) long. The details on its surface are not preserved with the exception of a tubercle in the left anterior corner of the carapace, only distinguished if it is placed under plane polarized light. This tubercle possibly represents a lateral eye. The appendages (limbs) are only known from two fragments on both left and right sides, probably belonging to the sixth (and last) pair of them. The left one had a length of 0.16 cm (0.063 in) and a width of 0.07 cm (0.028 in), while the right one was 0.27 cm (0.11 in) long and 0.06 cm (0.024 in) wide. Other Devonian chasmataspidids had this pair of appendages modified into swimming "paddles", so Forfarella may have had them as well.

The opisthosoma (abdomen), made up of 13 segments, had a total length of 1.18 cm (0.46 in). The preabdomen (segments 2 to 4) was nearly trapezoidal (that is, subtrapezoidal) and narrowed posteriorly. Vague impressions distinguish the second, third and fourth tergites (dorsal half of the segments), but not the first one. The postabdomen (segments 5 to 13) also tapered posteriorly and was longer, with its 9 tergites distinguishable in the fossil and with a length of approximately 0.08 cm (0.031 in) each. The telson (the posteriormost division of the body) is unknown, but it was probably short as in other contemporary chasmataspidids. The specimen had two cracks all over the prosoma (the head) and preabdomen, as well as dark patches probably corresponding to traces of the original cuticle.

== History of research ==
Location of Arbroath, a town near where the only known specimen of F. mitchelli has been found (the exact location is unknown)

Forfarella is known from one single poorly preserved specimen, BMNH In 60023. It was found in the Dundee Formation (within the Old Red Sandstone) near Arbroath, Scotland, in the United Kingdom. According to the label associated with the fossil, it was purchased in 1893 from the collection of a person surnamed Mitchell, who, along with other colleagues, was one of the fossil collectors in the area near Forfar. As they did not usually specify the exact type locality of their material, its tracking was problematic. After studying the fossil's label and comparing it with other fossils from Mitchell's collection that had more details about their origins, it was suggested in its 1999 description that the Kelly Den stream section, south of the village of Arbirlot, could be the original site. However, this cannot be confirmed. Following the purchase, the fossil of Forfarella was not instantly registered in the Natural History Museum of London like other fossils from Mitchell's collection.

In 1962, the British paleontologist Charles D. Waterston borrowed the still unregistered specimen, as well as four other fossils of juvenile eurypterids, to describe them. He noted the chasmataspidid nature of what would become the holotype of Forfarella, registered it as In 60023 and coined the name Forfarella mitchelli. However, Waterston would never publish his description, returning the fossil to the museum three years later, where it would be labeled with the same name given by the paleontologist. Thus, Forfarella mitchelli remained as a nomen manuscriptum (a taxonomic name that appears in an informally published document).

Despite the turbulent history of the fossil, the paleontologists Jason A. Dunlop, Lyall I. Anderson and Simon J. Braddy formally proposed and described Forfarella mitchelli for the first time in 1999 as a new genus of chasmataspidid. The name suggested by Waterston was kept to avoid future confusion. Anderson also studied a troublesome specimen allegedly at the National Museum of Scotland (later discovering that it was not there) which could represent another specimen of Forfarella. However, upon examination, it was discovered that it was not a chasmataspidid, but a poorly preserved undetermined arthropod fragment.

== Classification ==
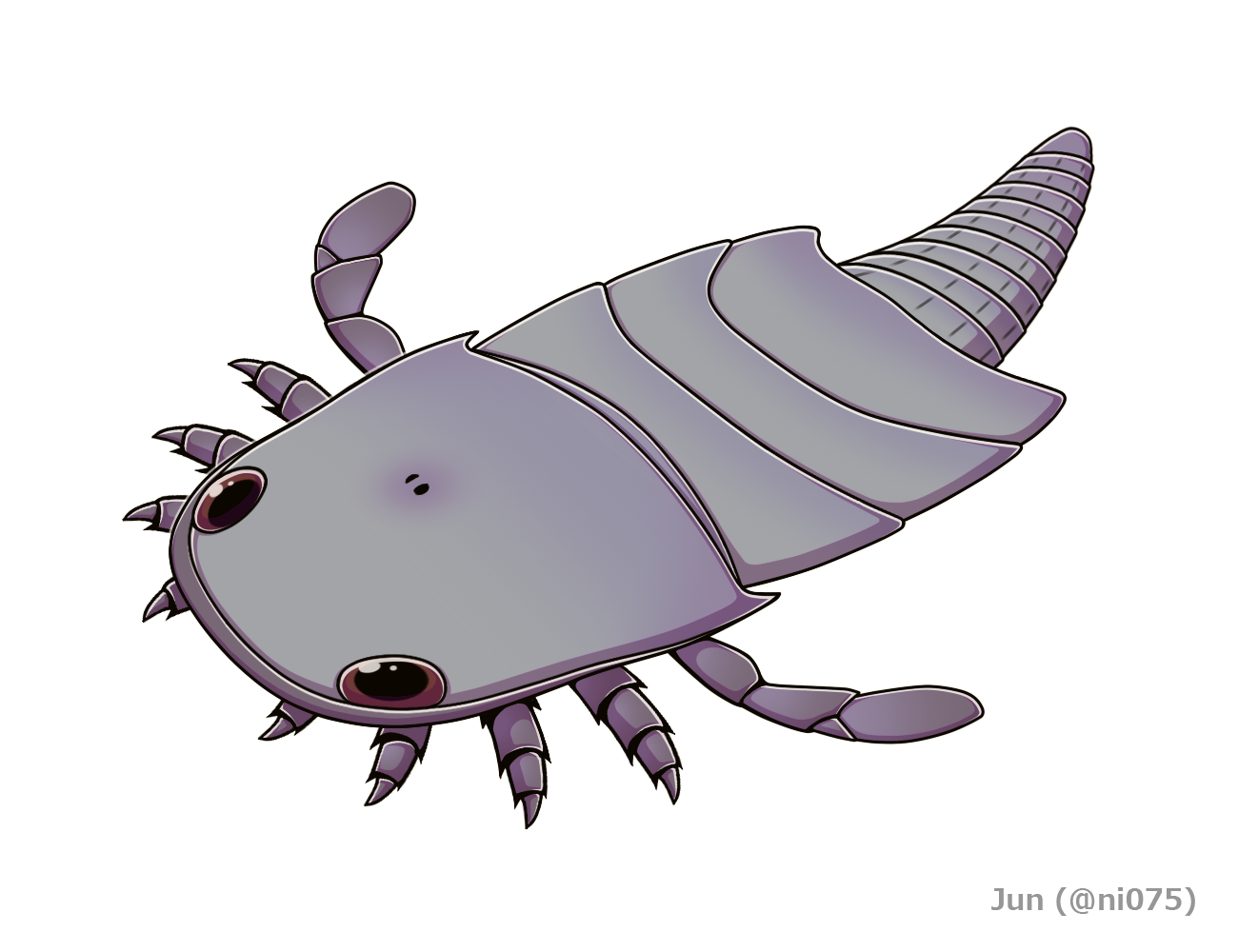
Restoration of Diploaspis casteri, a similar species of chasmataspidid

Forfarella is classified as part of the family Diploaspididae, one of the two families in the order Chasmataspidida. It includes one single species, F. mitchelli, from the Early Devonian of Scotland.

At the time Forfarella was described, members of Diploaspididae were defined as small chasmataspidids with a subrectangular or semicircular carapace, a tapering postabdomen and a short telson. Excluding the last one, which is uncertain, Forfarella possessed these features. Regarding other chasmataspidids, Forfarella was considerably similar to Diploaspis casteri, although it had a longer postabdomen, perhaps because of a taphonomic distortion (that is, a defect product of the fossilization of the organism) of the specimen. The genus also resembled other Devonian chasmataspidids, but differed from the Ordovician Chasmataspis, which was much larger and had genal spines (spines protruding from the posterolateral corners of the carapace). What differentiated Forfarella from the rest of the chasmataspidids was the dimensions of its body, its size, the shape of its carapace and the distinctive subtrapezoidal preabdomen. Even if Forfarella's affiliation with Diploaspididae is certain, the genus has not been included to date in any phylogenetic analysis or cladogram.

== Paleoecology ==
The specimen of Forfarella was discovered in Early Devonian deposits of Scotland. It was found at the Old Red Sandstone, in the Dundee Formation. The fossil is preserved in a gray siltstone. Its lithology (the physical characteristics of the rocks of the fossil) is similar to that of the laminate fish-bearing beds in Tealing, a Scottish village near from the suspected type locality. However, the exact location from which it was recollected is still unknown.

It is thought that Forfarella, just as other Devonian chasmataspidids, had its sixth pair of appendages modified into paddles. These would have made it an active swimmer. Furthermore, the deposits in which Forfarella was found were lacustrine, that is, they formed on the bottom of an ancient lake. This type of chasmataspidids subsequently invaded freshwater habitats, maybe due to the Late Devonian extinction event.

In 2017, a new species of Diploaspis, D. praecursor, was described. Unlike the other two, this species was Silurian (which goes before the Devonian), extending the fossil range of the genus. This also suggests that there could be specimens from earlier times of other diploaspidids similar to Diploaspis, such as Achanarraspis or Forfarella, that have yet to be discovered (i.e. a "ghost" range).
