= Kiaeria limuloides =

Kiaeria limuloides Temporal range: Late Silurian

Scientific classification
- Kingdom: Animalia
- Phylum: Arthropoda
- Subphylum: Chelicerata
- Order: †Chasmataspidida
- Family: †incertae sedis
- Genus: †Kiaeria; Størmer, 1934
- Species: †K. limuloides

Binomial name
- †Kiaeria limuloides Størmer, 1934

Extinct species of arthropod

Kiaeria is a genus of chasmataspidid, a group of extinct aquatic arthropods. It was originally classified as a xiphosuran of the monotypic family Kiaeriidae. However, in 2019, the British geologist and paleobiologist James C. Lamsdell assigned the genus to the order Chasmataspidida, possibly being a member of the family Chasmataspididae. Only one species has been assigned to this genus, Kiaeria limuloides.
