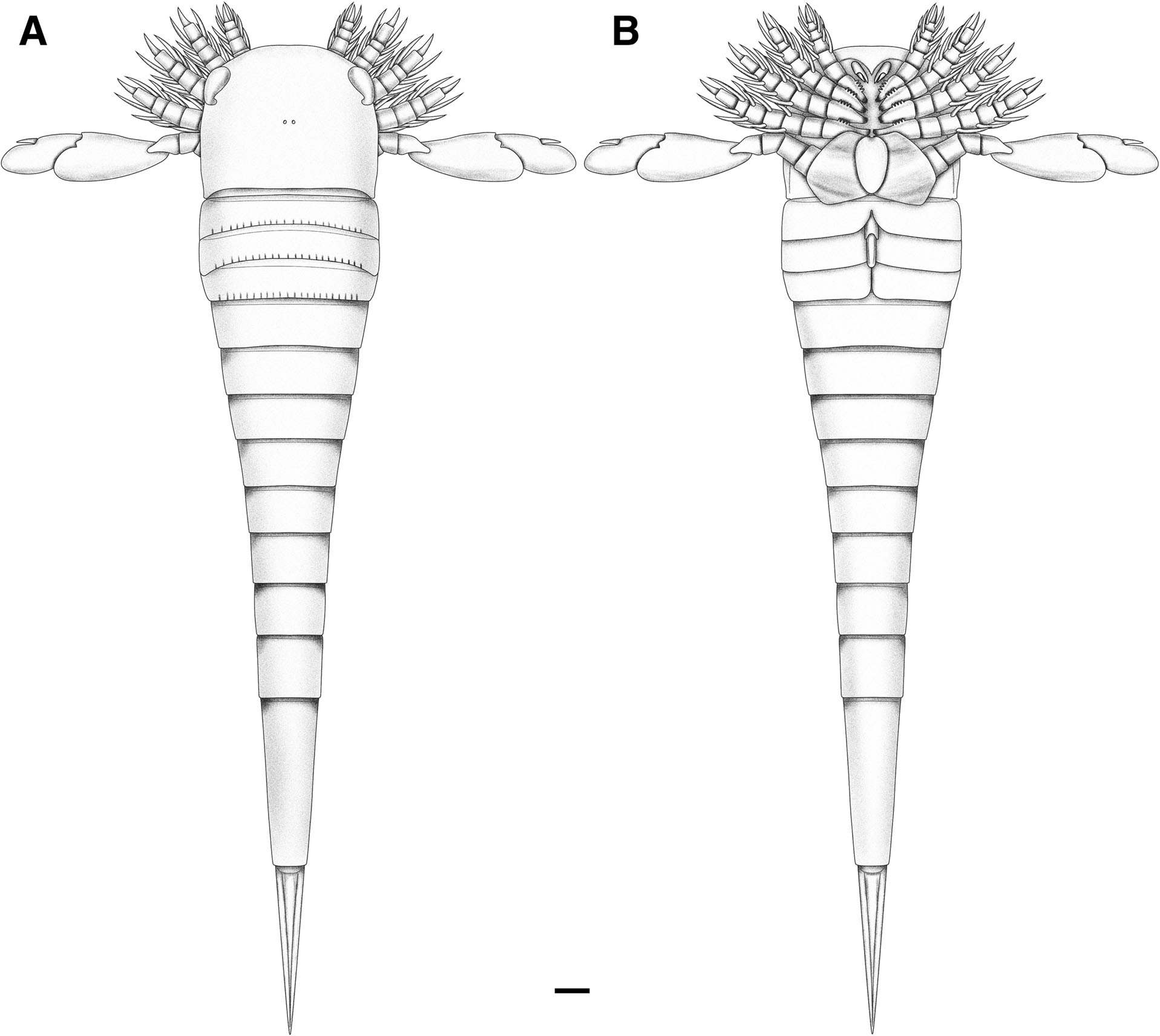
- Life restoration of H. hiawathai, with some elements based on Octoberaspis
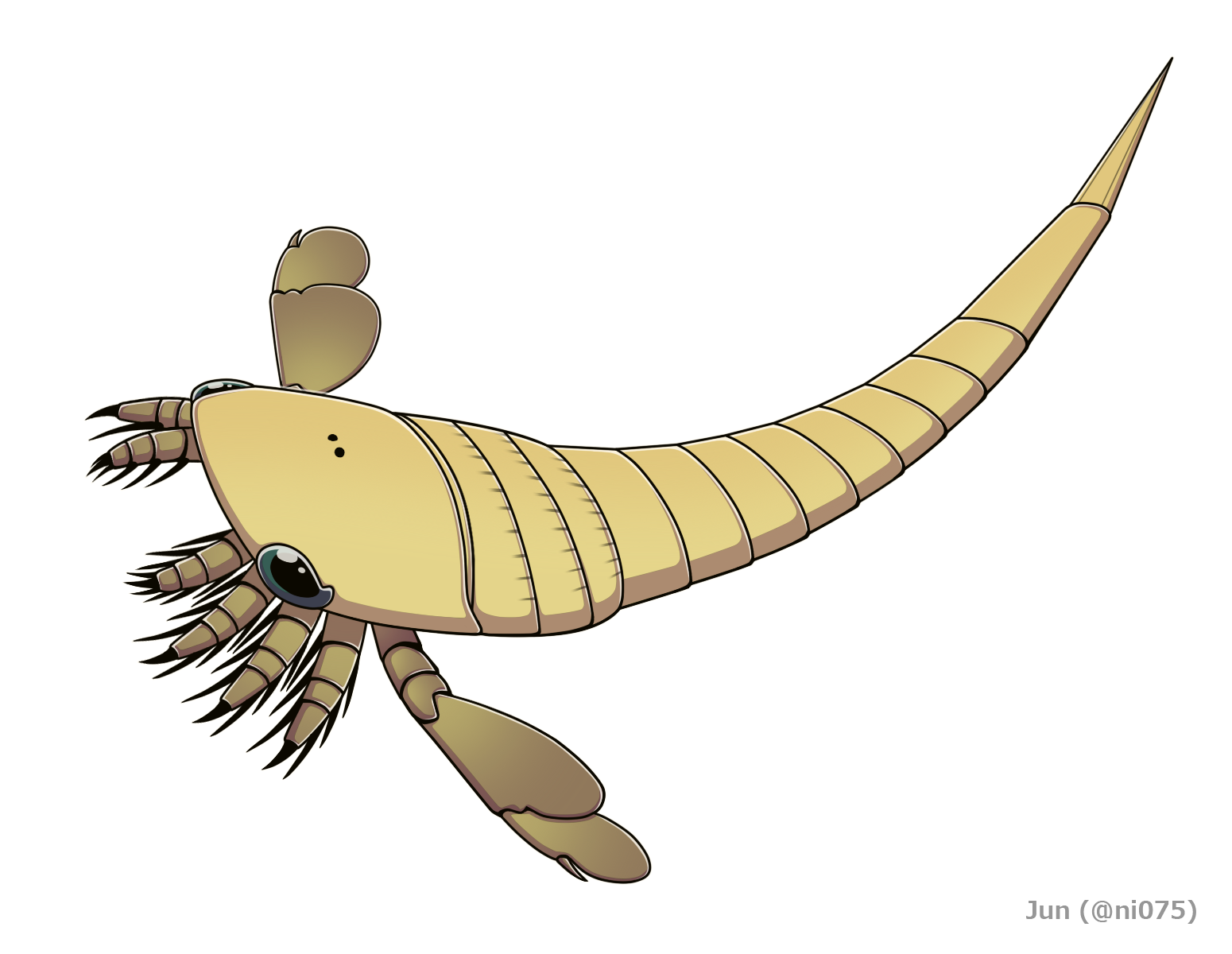

Scientific classification
- Kingdom: Animalia
- Phylum: Arthropoda
- Subphylum: Chelicerata
- Clade: Dekatriata
- Order: †Chasmataspidida
- Family: †Diploaspididae
- Genus: †Hoplitaspis; Lamsdell et al., 2019

Type species
- †Hoplitaspis hiawathai Lamsdell et al., 2019

= Hoplitaspis =

Hoplitaspis Temporal range: Late Katian 449–445 Ma

Extinct genus of arthropods

Hoplitaspis is a genus of chasmataspidid, an extinct group of aquatic arthropods. Fossils of Hoplitaspis have been discovered in Late Ordovician deposits of the Lagerstätte of the Big Hill Formation exposed at Stonington Peninsula in Michigan's Upper Peninsula, United States. Its generic name is derived from the hoplites (Ancient Greek citizen-soldiers) and the Ancient Greek word άσπίς (aspis, meaning "shield"). The specific name hiawathai honors Hiawatha, a Native American leader and co-founder of the Iroquois Confederacy.
