= Big Hill Formation =

Geologic formation in Michigan

- Stratigraphic range: Katian
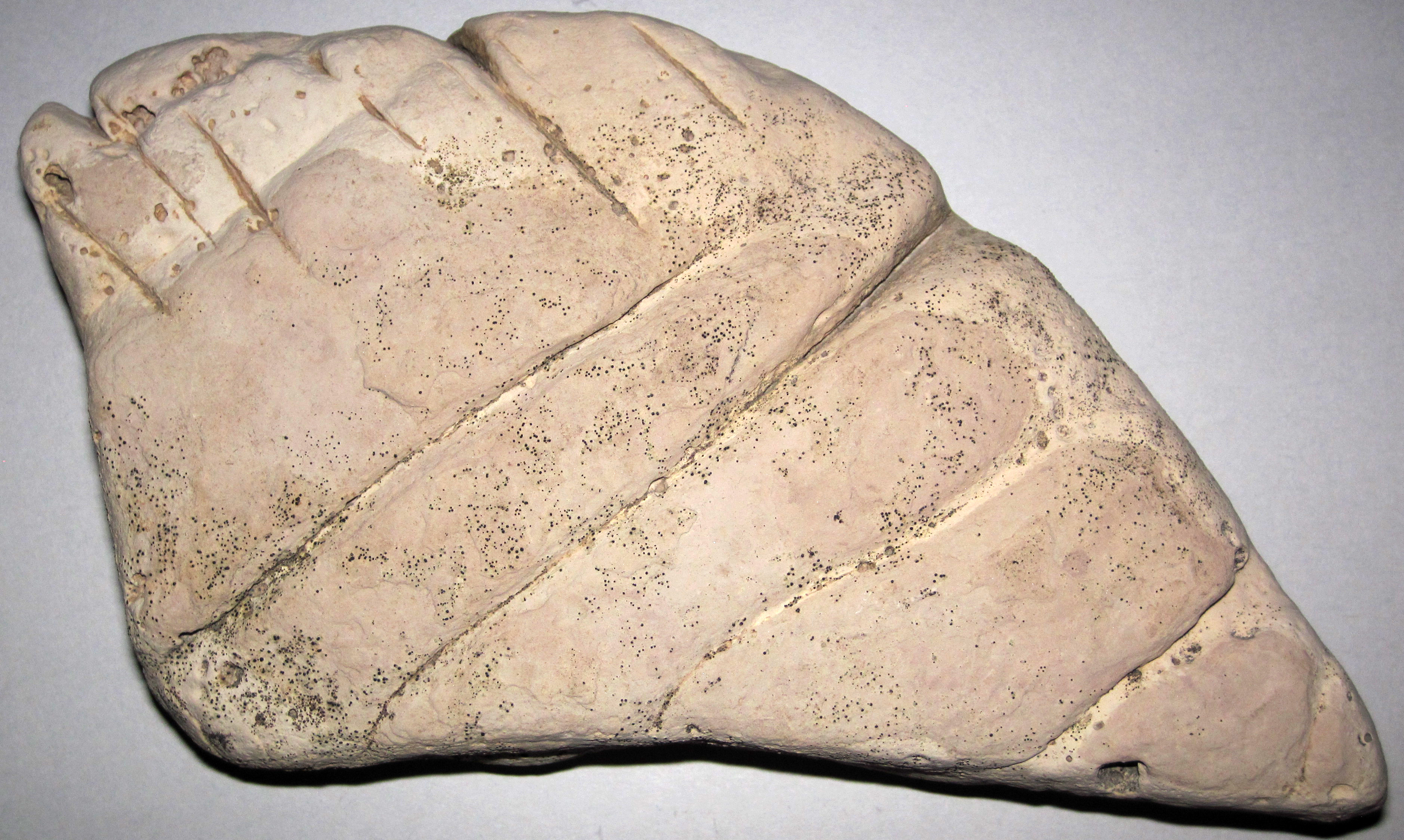
- Jointed limestone from the Big Hill Formation (Upper Peninsula of Michigan)
- Type: Formation
- Unit of: Richmond Group (geology)
- Underlies: Manitoulin Dolomite
- Overlies: Stonington Formation

Lithology
- Primary: limestone

Location
- Region: Michigan
- Country: United States

The Big Hill Formation is a geologic formation in Michigan. It preserves fossils dating back to the Ordovician period. A fossiliferous site on the Stonington Peninsula (in Delta County) includes a dolomite bed of the Big Hill Formation which has abundant and well-preserved fossils. The most common fossils are soft-bodied medusae (jellyfish), followed by linguloid brachiopods, algae, and arthropods (namely chasmataspidids, leperditiid ostracods, and eurypterids). This site is considered a Konservat-Lagerstätte, and is commonly referred to as the Big Hill Lagerstätte or Big Hill Biota.

== Depositional environment ==
The Big Hill formation likely represents a shallow, sheltered basin within the photic zone, suggested by the completeness and lack of transport of the algal specimens. However, the lack of desiccation cracks and adhesion structures suggests that there was no subaerial exposure and the absence of ripple marks suggests that the basin was at least several meters deep.

The basin was likely dysoxic, as suggested by the limited diversity and lack of bioturbation. In addition, the lack of rhynchonellate brachiopods and echinoderms as well as the abundance of lingulids suggests that the basin had a different salinity than normal marine environments; however, direct evidence of hypersalinity like evaporite molds is absent. Microbial mats provide evidence of ecological stress.

While the basin was largely sheltered, it was likely connected by an extent to open marine ecosystems, as shown by the presence of chasmataspidids, eurypterids, and scyphozoan medusae. The medusae represent different stages of decomposition, suggesting that they were not all deposited in a single event but rather accumulated over time on the seabed via waves or currents. In addition, the orthocones may have been empty shells that drifted into the basin.

== Fossil content ==
Color key: Taxon / Reclassified taxon / Taxon falsely reported as present / Dubious taxon or junior synonym / Ichnotaxon / Ootaxon / Morphotaxon

Notes
Uncertain or tentative taxa are in small text
~~crossed out~~ taxa are discredited.

=== Chelicerates ===
Chelicerata
Genus	Species	Images	Notes
Hoplitaspis	H. hiawathai	Hoplitaspis hiawathai	A diploaspidid chasmataspidid.
Carcinosomatidae indet.			A carcinosomatid eurypterid.
Dolichopteridae indet.			A dolichopterid eurypterid.
Lunataspis	L. gundersoni		A xiphosuran.

=== Trilobites ===
Trilobita
Genus	Species	Images	Notes
Isotelinae indet.			

=== Crustaceans ===
Crustacea
Genus	Species	Images	Notes
Leperditiidae indet.			A leperditiid ostracod.

=== Lophophorates ===
Lophophorata
Genus	Species	Images	Notes
?Lingula	?L. changi		A lingulid brachiopod.
?Trematis	?T. rugosa		A discinoid brachiopod.
?Hallopora	?Hallopora sp.		A halloporid bryozoan.

=== Mollusks ===
Mollusca
Genus	Species	Images	Notes
Lophospira	Lophospira sp.		A gastropod.
Actinocerida indet.			A actinocerid cephalopod.
Pseudorthocerida indet.			A pseudorthocerid cephalopod.
?Vanuxemia	?Vanuxemia sp.		A bivalve.

=== Cnidarians ===
Cnidaria
Genus	Species	Images	Notes
Conchopeltis	Conchopeltis sp.		A scyphozoan.

=== Algae ===
Flora
Genus	Species	Images	Notes
Archaeobatophora	A. typa		
Chaetocladus	Chaetocladus sp.		

== See also ==
- List of fossiliferous stratigraphic units in Michigan
