= Manitoulin Dolomite =

Geologic formation in Ontario

- Stratigraphic range: Llandovery
- Type: Formation
- Unit of: Cataract Group
- Underlies: Cabot Head Shale
- Overlies: Big Hill Formation

Location
- Region: Ohio, Ontario, and Michigan
- Country: Canada and United States

The Manitoulin Dolomite is a geologic formation in Ontario. It preserves fossils dating back to the Silurian period.

== See also ==
- List of fossiliferous stratigraphic units in Ontario
