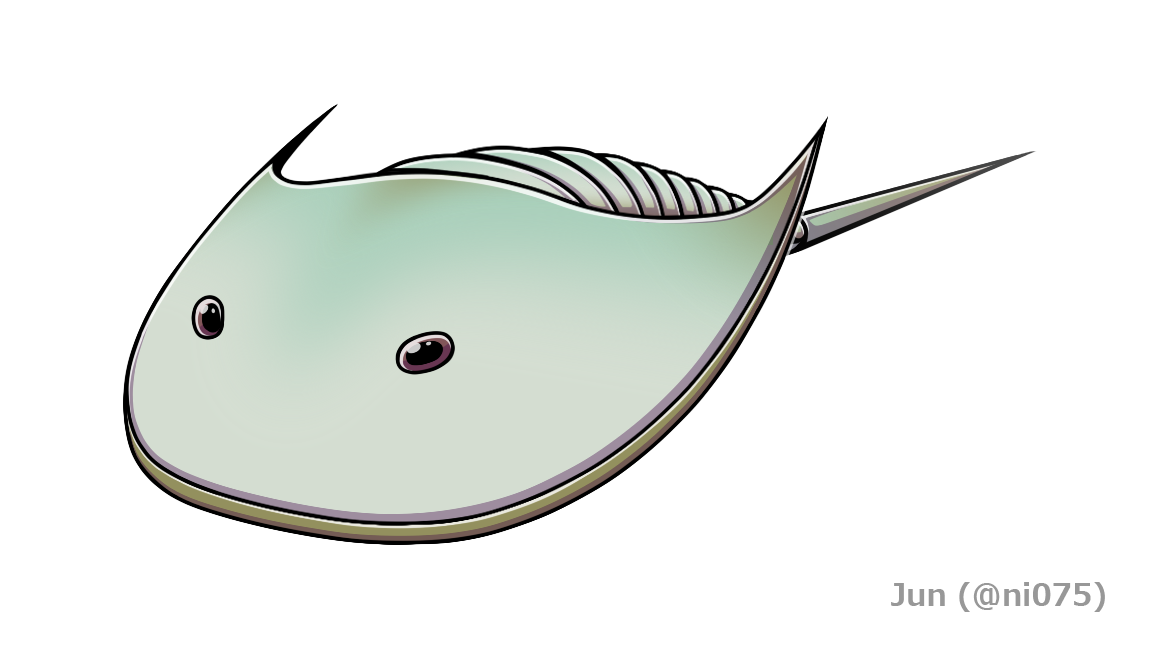
- Reconstruction of Houia yueya

Scientific classification
- Kingdom: Animalia
- Phylum: Arthropoda
- Subphylum: Chelicerata
- Clade: Planaterga
- Clade: Dekatriata
- Genus: †Houia; Selden, Lamsdell & Qi, 2015

Type species
- †Houia yueya Lamsdell, Xue & Selden, 2013

Species
- †H. guangxiensis Wang et al., 2021; †H. yueya Lamsdell, Xue & Selden, 2013

= Houia =

Houia Temporal range: Lochkovian–Emsian, 416–393.3 Ma

Extinct genus of arthropods

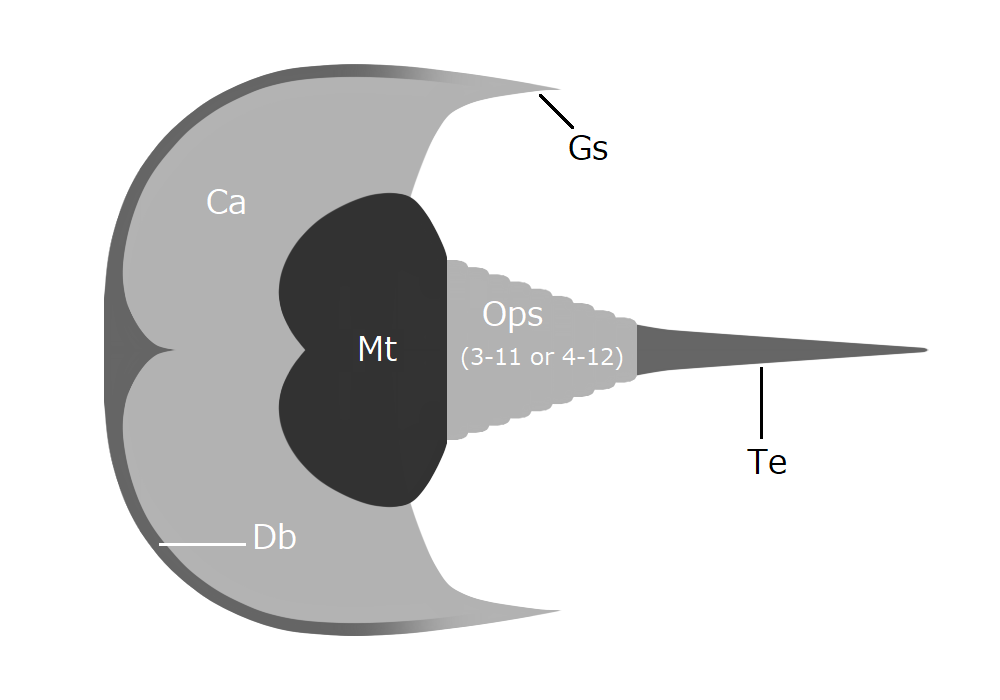
Ventral structures of Houia yueya, showing metastoma (Mt)

Houia is an extinct genus of dekatriatan, a clade of chelicerate arthropods. Fossils of Houia have been discovered in deposits of the Early Devonian period in Guangxi and Yunnan, both in China. The genus contains two species: H. guangxiensis, from the Pragian to Emsian epoch of Guangxi; and H. yueya, the type species, from the Lochkovian epoch of Yunnan. The name of the genus is derived from the Chinese character 鲎 (hòu), meaning "horseshoe crab".

Houia yueya was originally described as a species of the xiphosuran (horseshoe crab) genus Kasibelinurus (Kasibelinurus yueya) in 2013, with its narrow opisthosoma (the trunk section) being misinterpreted as incompletely preserved (lacking lateral regions). The species name yueya comes from the Chinese characters 月 (yuè, meaning "Moon") and 牙 (yá, meaning "crescent"), referring to the crescentic shape of its carapace (the dorsal plate of the prosoma or head).

H. yueya was redescribed and replaced under its own genus, Houia, in 2015, being reinterpreted as a basal ("primitive") dekatriatan possessing both horseshoe crab and eurypterid-like features (e.g. crescentic carapace for the former, and metastoma for the latter). Unlike most of dekatriatans like eurypterids and chasmataspidids, the metastoma (ventral plate in front of opisthosoma) of Houia is unusually enlarged, only being comparable by some mycteropoid eurypterids, and may have acted to crush more fortified prey. In 2021, a new species of Houia, H. guangxiensis, was described. Its species name derivates from the Chinese province in which it was discovered, Guangxi.
