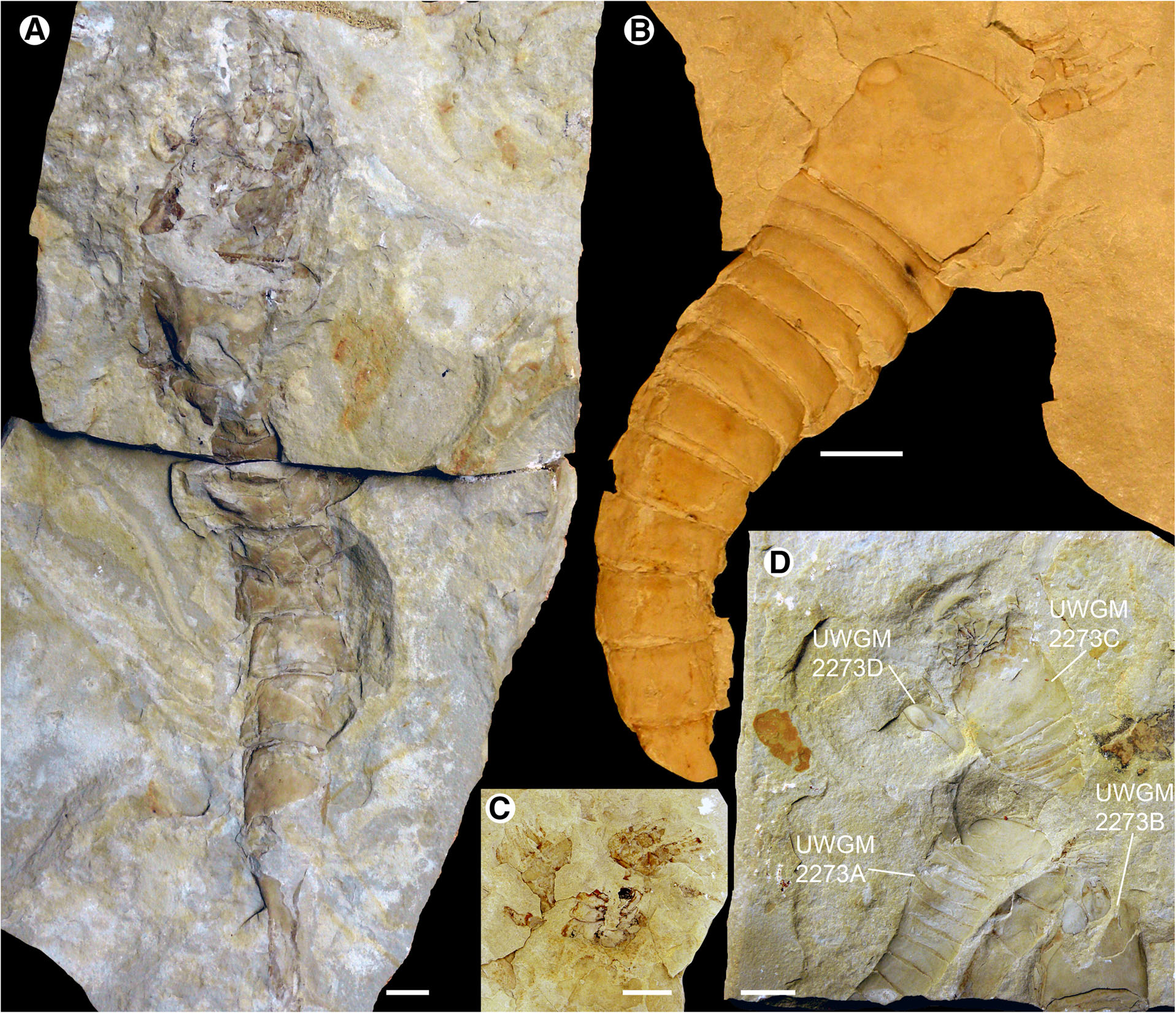
- Fossils of Hoplitaspis hiawathai.
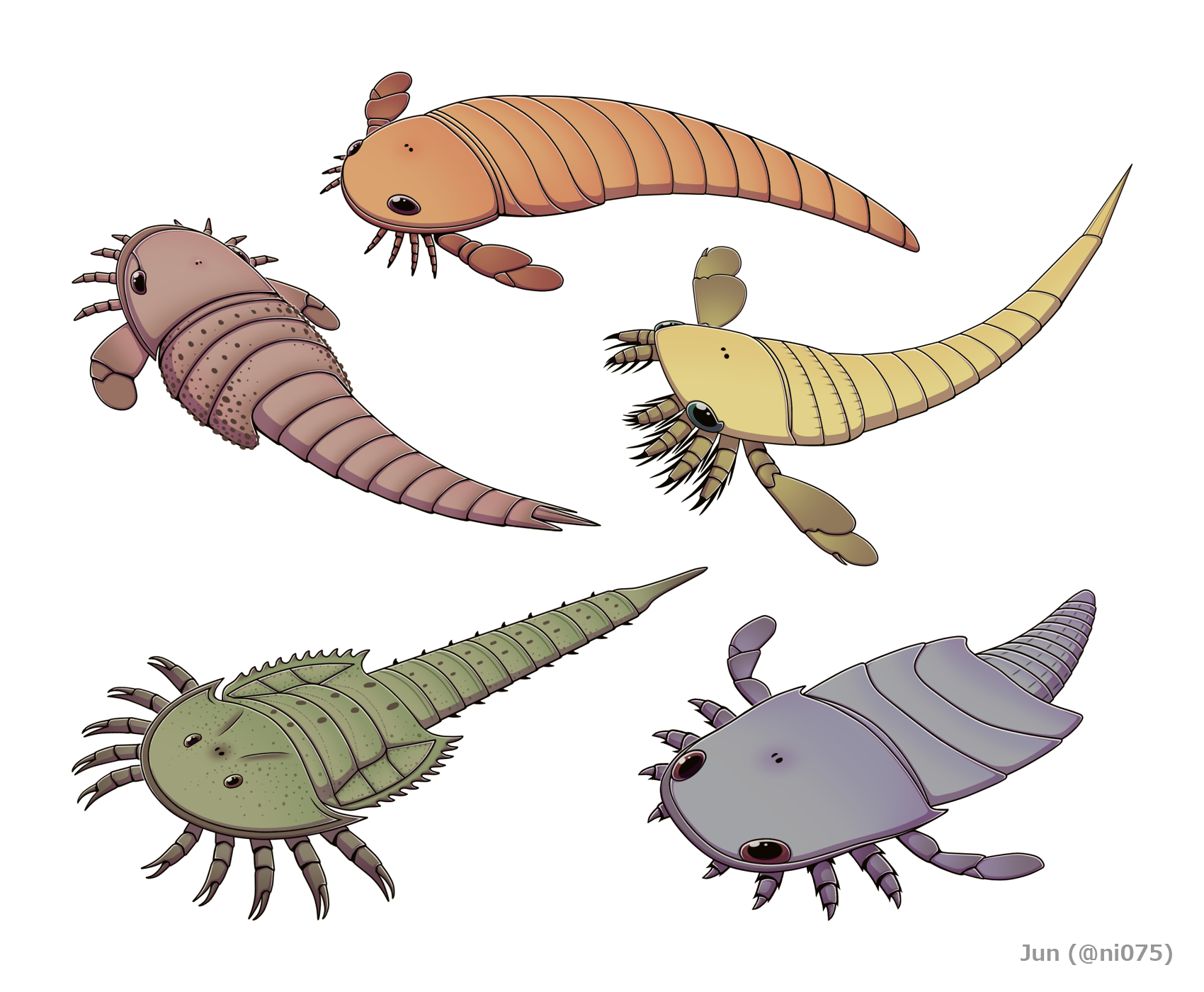
- Reconstruction of Dvulikiaspis menneri (middle top), Octoberaspis ushakovi (top left), Hoplitaspis hiawathai (top right), Chasmataspis laurencii (bottom left) and Diploaspis casteri (bottom right).

Scientific classification
- Kingdom: Animalia
- Phylum: Arthropoda
- Subphylum: Chelicerata
- Clade: Dekatriata
- Order: †Chasmataspidida; Caster & Brooks, 1956

Clades
- †Chasmataspididae Caster & Brooks, 1956; †Diploaspididae Størmer, 1972; †Kiaeria Størmer, 1934

Synonyms
- Diploaspidida Simonetta & Delle Cave, 1978

= Chasmataspidida =

Chasmataspidida Temporal range: Ordovician–Mid Devonian

Order of arthropods

Chasmataspidids, sometime referred to as chasmataspids, are a group of extinct chelicerate arthropods that form the order Chasmataspidida. Chasmataspidids are probably related to horseshoe crabs (Xiphosura) and/or sea scorpions (Eurypterida), while more recent studies suggest that they form a clade (Dekatriata) with Eurypterida and Arachnida. Chasmataspidids are known sporadically in the fossil record through to the mid-Devonian, with possible evidence suggesting that they were also present during the late Cambrian. Chasmataspidids are most easily recognised by having an opisthosoma divided into a wide forepart (preabdomen) and a narrow hind part (postabdomen) each comprising 4 and 9 segments respectively. There is some debate about whether they form a natural (i.e. monophyletic) group.

== Distribution ==
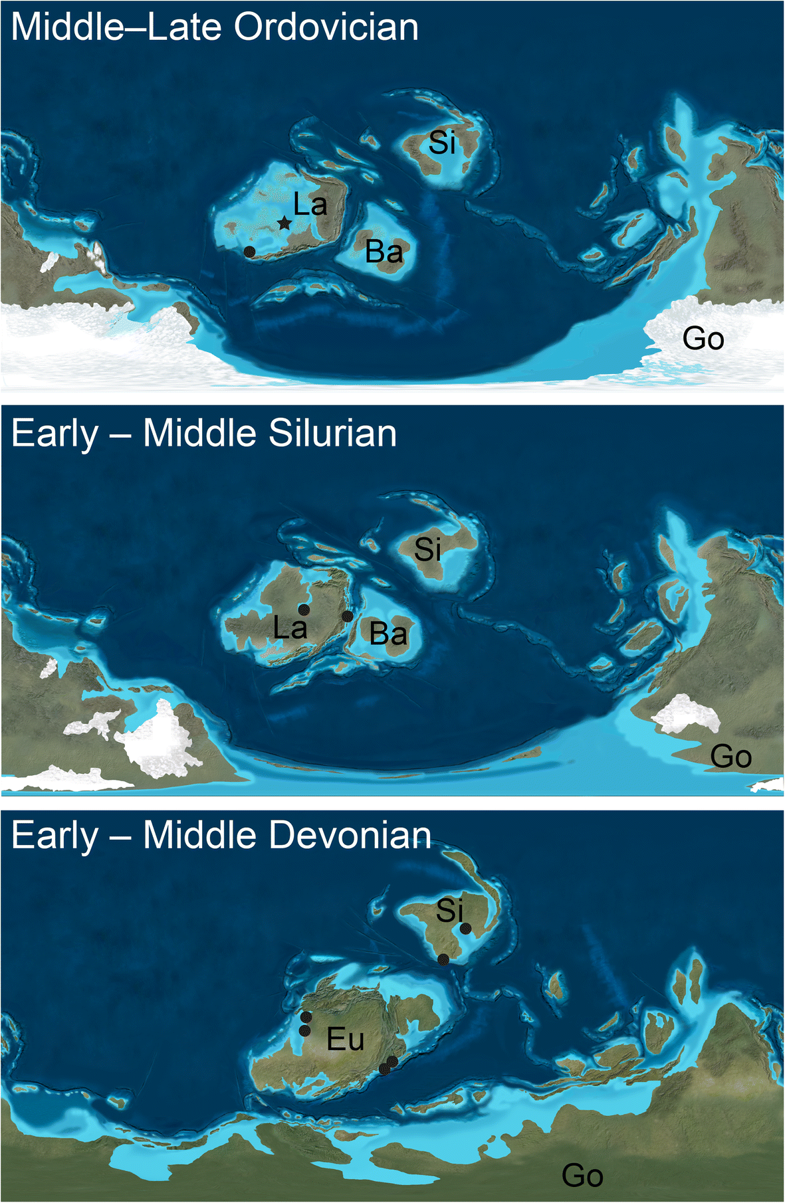
Geographic distribution of chasmataspidids.

Chasmataspidids survived at least since Ordovician to mid-Devonian in age. As of 2019, most chasmataspidids (with a total of 9 species) are known from the Devonian strata, while the preceding Silurian and Ordovician period each have 3 and 2 species being described. Diploaspis is the only genus of chasmataspidids that unambiguously comprises species from different periods (D. casteri and D. muelleri from Devonian and D. praecursor from silurian). There was also a trace fossil composed of resting imprints with Chasmataspis-like outline discovered from late-Cambrian stratum in Texas, which might suggest an earlier occurrence of chasmataspidids. In addition, likely fossils from the Jiangshanian have been recorded from the Kimiltei site. However, affinities of those Cambrian records are questioned in 2023 study, identifying imprint from Texas (named Minterichnus shieldi) as made by phyllocarid, and suggesting Kimiltei fossils are also phyllocarids, while original authors argues.

== Morphology ==
Most chasmataspidids are small arthropods with a body length that did not exceed 3 centimeters, with the ordovician species being exceptionally large, ranging between 10 (Chasmataspis) and 29 centimeters (Hoplitaspis).

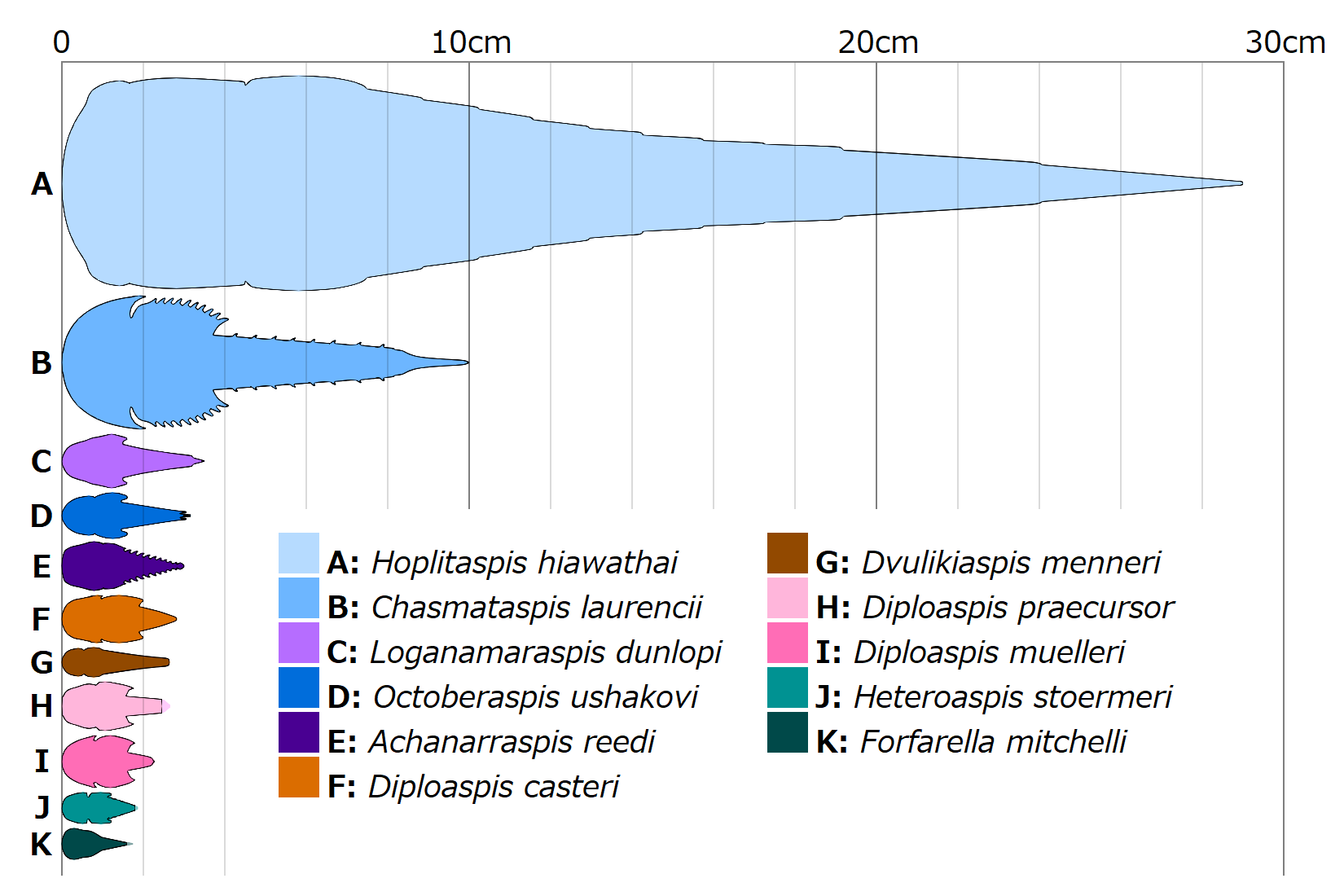
Size comparison of various chasmataspidids.

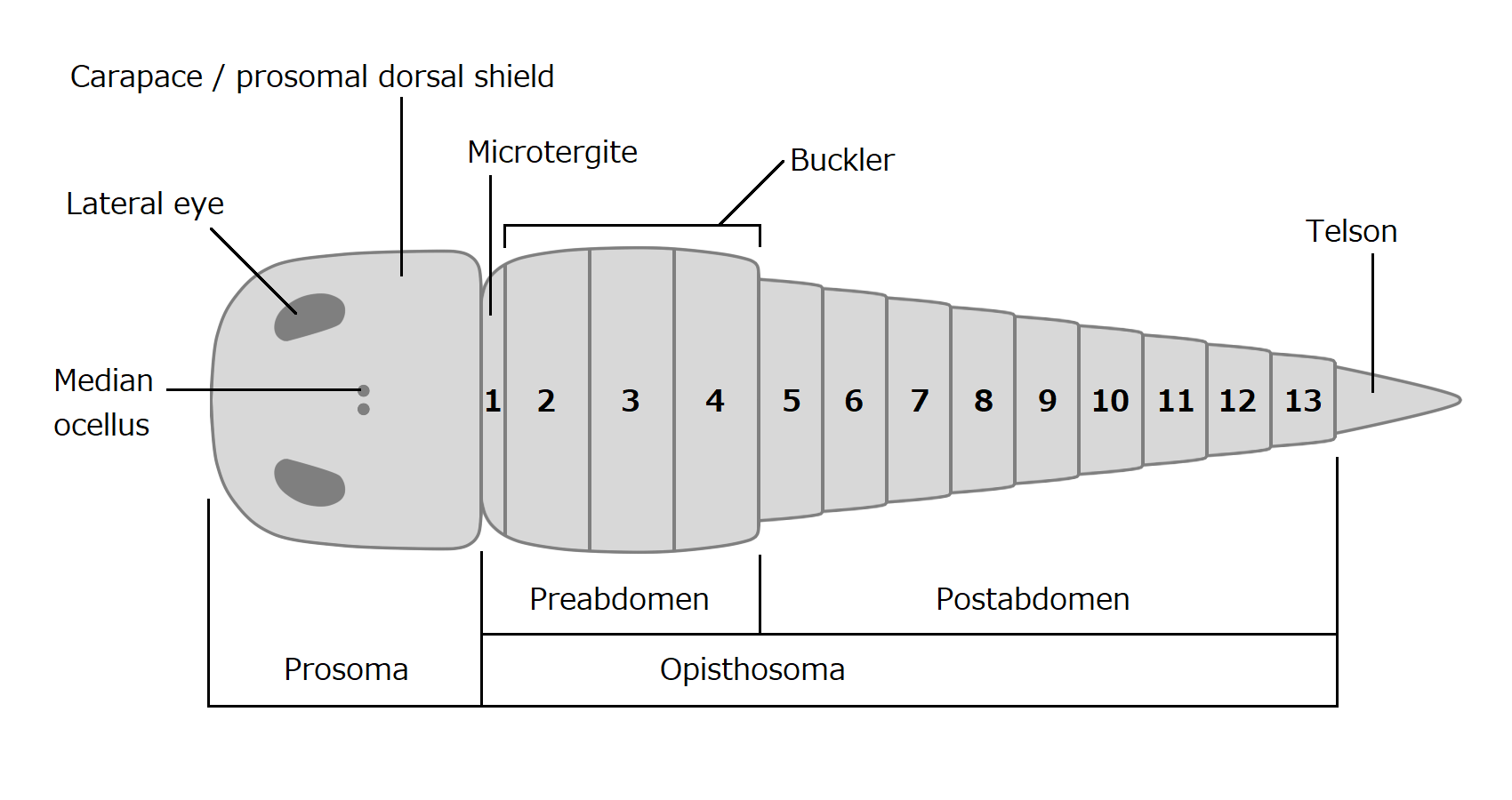
Dorsal morphology of a generalized chasmataspidid.

The streamlined body of a chasmataspidid is composed of a rigid prosoma and an externally 13-segmented opisthosoma. As in eurypterids, the dorsal side of the prosoma was covered by a rigid carapace (prosomal dorsal shield) that bore a pair of larger lateral (presumably compound) eyes and a pair of tiny median ocelli. Chasmataspidids are readily distinguished from other chelicerates by the subdivision of the 13 opisthosomal segments into a widened, 4-segmented preabdomen and a slender, 9-segmented postabdomen. the tergite (dorsal exoskeleton) of the first opisthosomal or preabdominal segment is retained as a narrow element known as 'microtergite', which is not observed in eurypterids. The posterior three preabdominal segments are well developed, forming a rigid box-like section called a 'buckler'. The postabdominal segments are cylindrical, and the last segment terminates with a spine/plate-like telson, which is usually relatively short.

=== Appendages ===
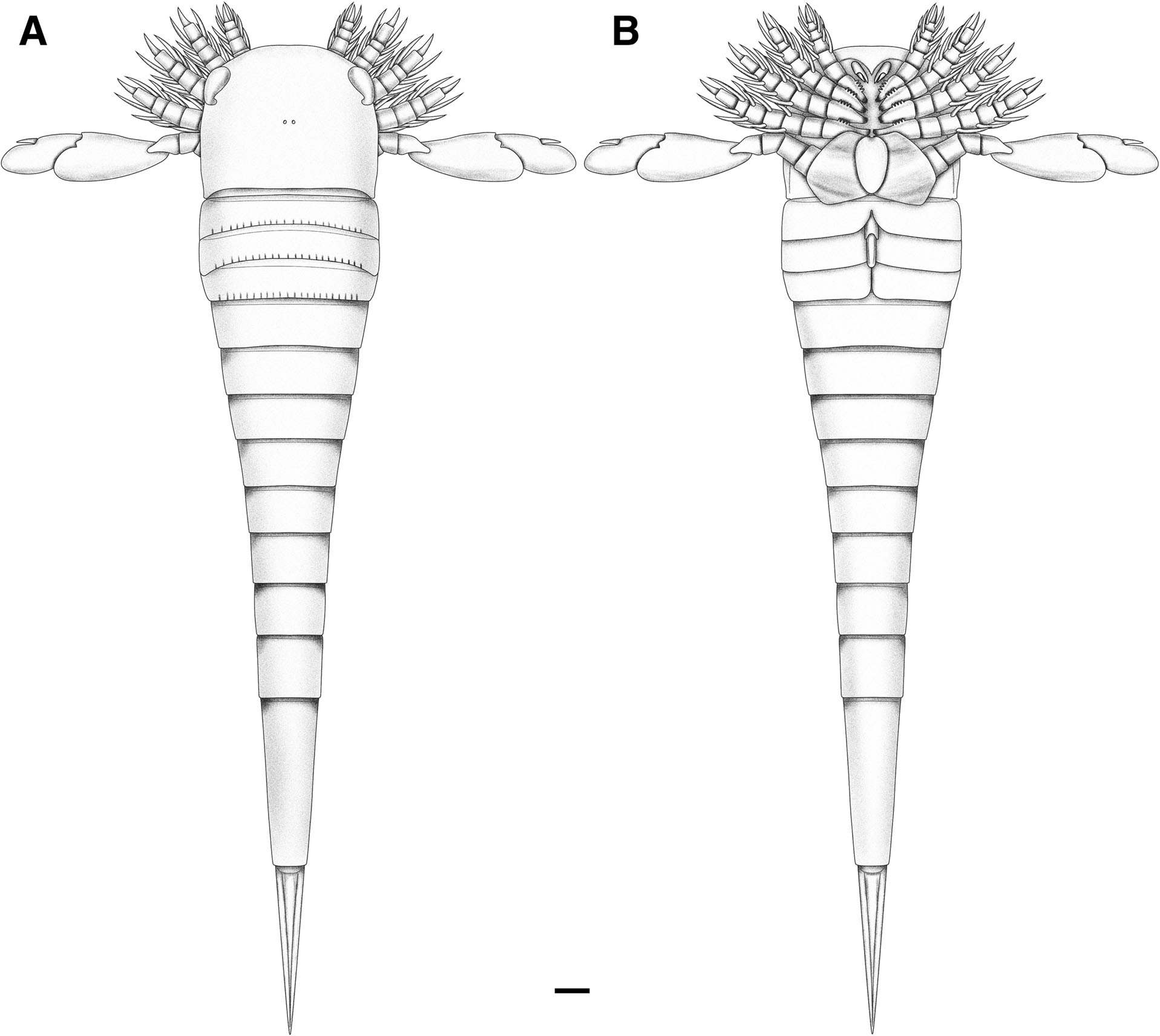
Reconstruction of Hoplitaspis hiawathai with ventral view (B) showing appendicular structures.

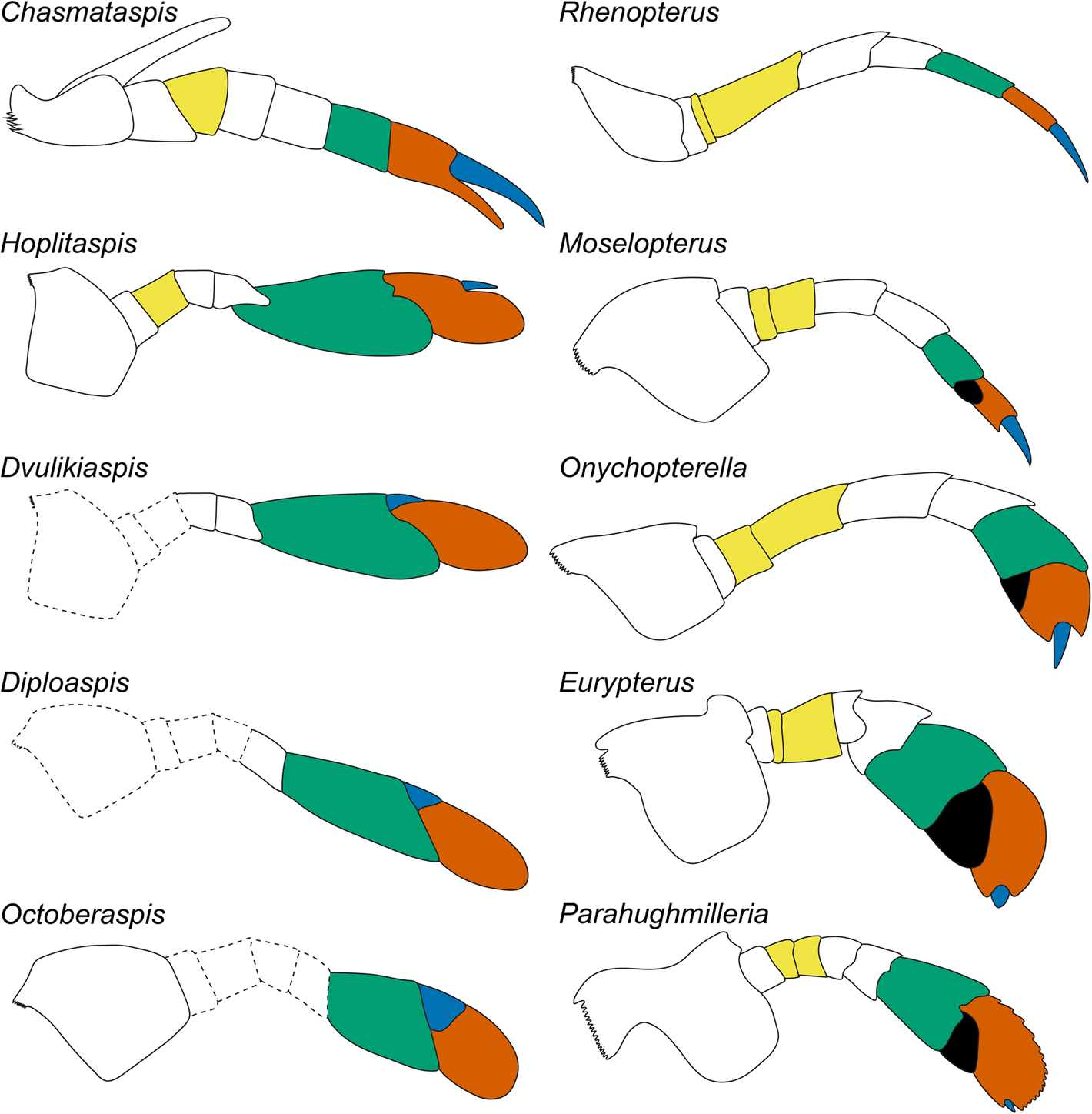
Comparison of appendage VI between chasmataspidids (left) and eurypterids (right).

Since the appendages of chasmataspidid are rarely preserved in the fossil, most species have only fragile or even no appendicular structures had been described. Based on available materials, the prosoma compose of 6 appendage pairs (appendage I - VI) just like most euchelicerates, which were 1 pair of small chelicerae and 5 pairs of limb-like appendages, although the detail morphology of the former is still unclear. The coxae (basalmost limb segments) of appendage II-VI bore gnathobases. At least the posteriormost appendage pair (appendage VI) of prosoma seems to be differ between families. Appendage of Chasmataspididae known only from 2 disarticulated specimens of appendages which interpreted as appendage VI of Chasmataspis. the appendage bore exopod-like structure on the base and terminated with a chelate (pincer), similar to those of a xiphosuran. On the other hand, Appendage VI modified into a paddle that strikingly resemble to those of a eurypterine (swimming eurypterid) was discovered in some species of Diploaspididae, but the basal diploaspidid Loganamaraspis possibly did not possess this character on Appendage VI. the limb-like appendage II-V of diploaspidids are either featureless or bore rows of spines.

Opisthosomal appendages are even rarely being observed and only known from a few diploaspidid materials. they are at least present on the ventral side of preabdomen, each pair originated from one preabdominal segment. the anteriormost appendicular structure of opisthosoma was metastoma, a plate-like structure interpreted as a fused appendage pair of first opisthosomal segment, situated between the gnathobase of prosomal appendage VI. Beyond the metastoma were 3 pairs of plate-like opercula originated from the 3 buckler segments, with the first operculum pair (genital operculum) bore a medially positioned genital appendage that extend until the posterior region of second operculum pair. Some of the opercula may have book gills just like those of xiphosurans and eurypterids, but the evidence are equivocal. Previous reports of a large operculum cover the whole ventral surface of buckler are most likely a misinterpretation of the ventral buckler wall (sternites or dorsal surface of gill chamber), which were originally enclosed by the opercula in life. The metastoma, opercula and genital appendage are shared characters between chasmataspidid and eurypterid, but unlike the fused first and second operculum pair of eurypterid, the two operculum pairs seems to be unfused in chasmataspidid. Possible chasmataspidid trace fossil from cambrian have imprints resembling 6 pairs of opercula. If the interpretation is true, chasmataspidid may had extra 3 pairs of opercula on the first 3 postabdominal segment as well.

== Representative genera ==
=== Chasmataspis ===
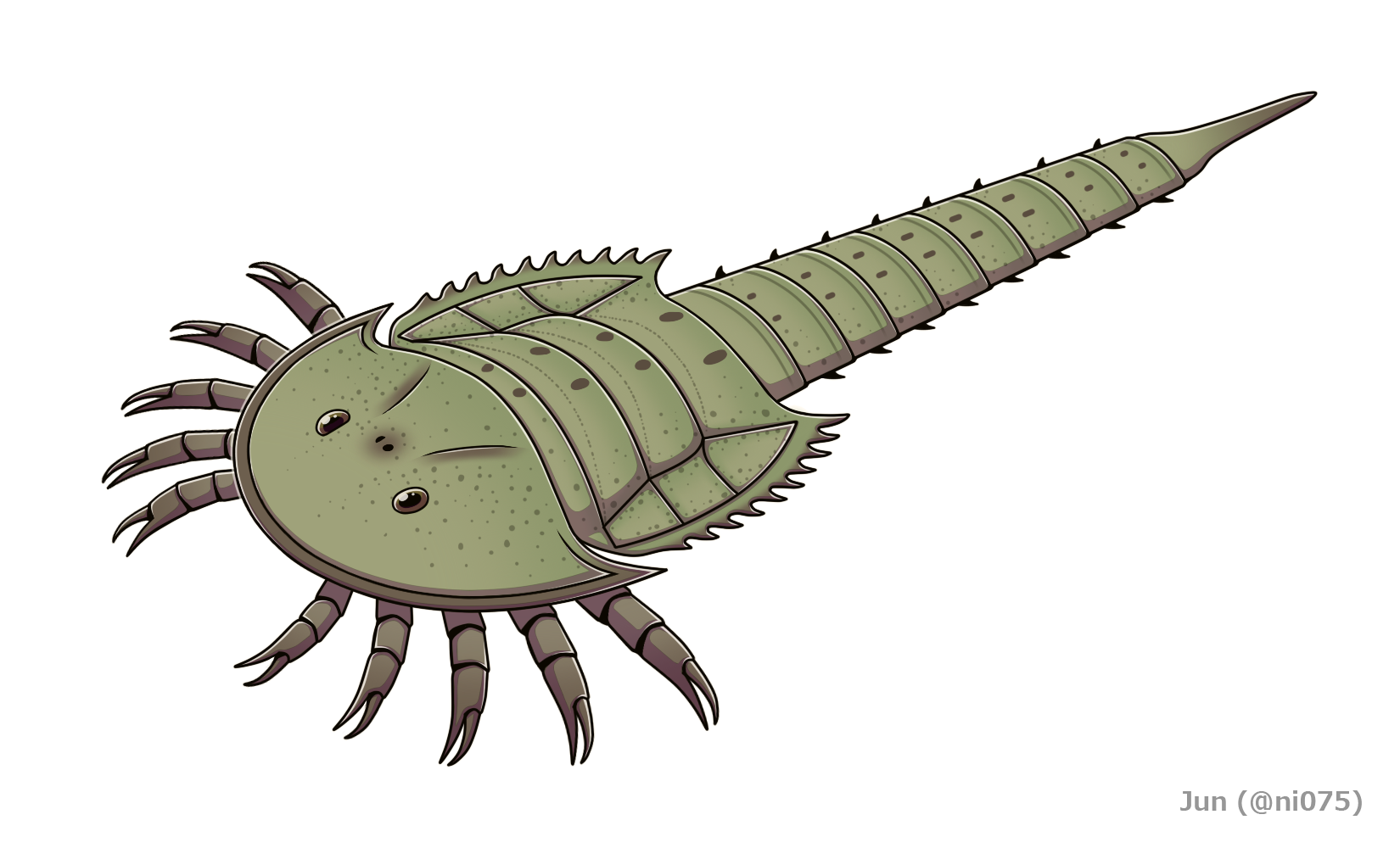
Reconstruction of Chasmataspis laurencii.

The first chasmataspidid to be discovered was Chasmataspis laurencii, described by the American palaeontologists Kenneth E. Caster and H. K. Brooks in 1956. These Ordovician fossils come from the site of the Douglas Dam in Tennessee, USA. They are the most xiphosuran-like of the known chasmataspidid species, with a horseshoe-shaped carapace. Caster & Brooks raised a new family, Chasmataspididae, to accommodate these specimens. The species was redescribed by Jason Dunlop and colleagues in 2004.

=== Diploaspis ===
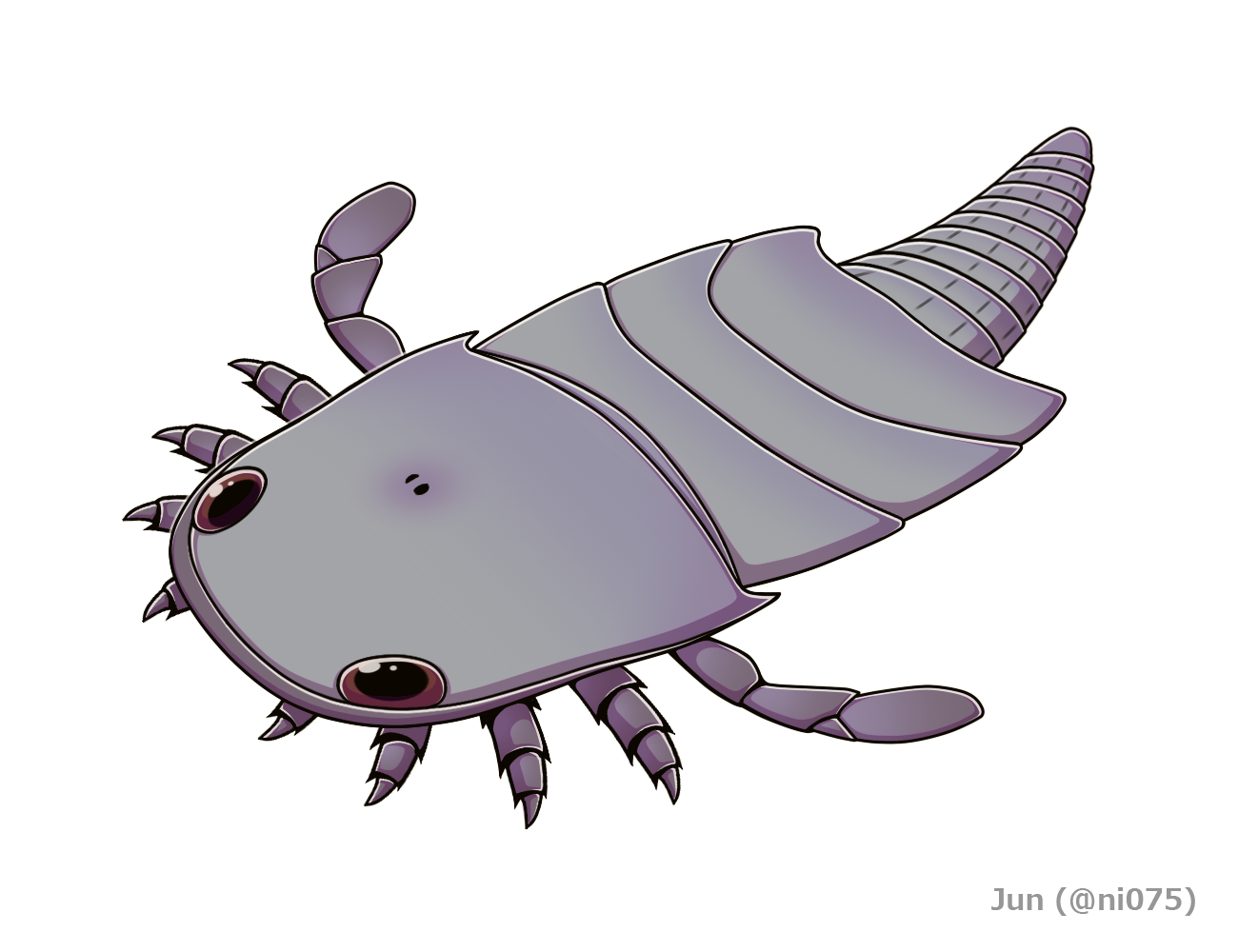
Reconstruction of Diploaspis casteri.

The next species to be discovered were Diploaspis casteri and Heteroaspis novojilovi; both described by the Norwegian palaeontologist Leif Størmer from the early Devonian of Alken an der Mosel in Germany in 1972.

A revision by Markus Poschmann and co-workers in 2005 recognised H. novojilovi as a synonym of D. casteri. The two species appear to actually be preservational variants of the same species. Poschmann et al. also described a second species as Diploaspis muelleri.

A third species, Diploaspis praecursor (Late Silurian, Bertie Group, New York State), was described by Lamsdell and Briggs in 2017.

=== Forfarella ===
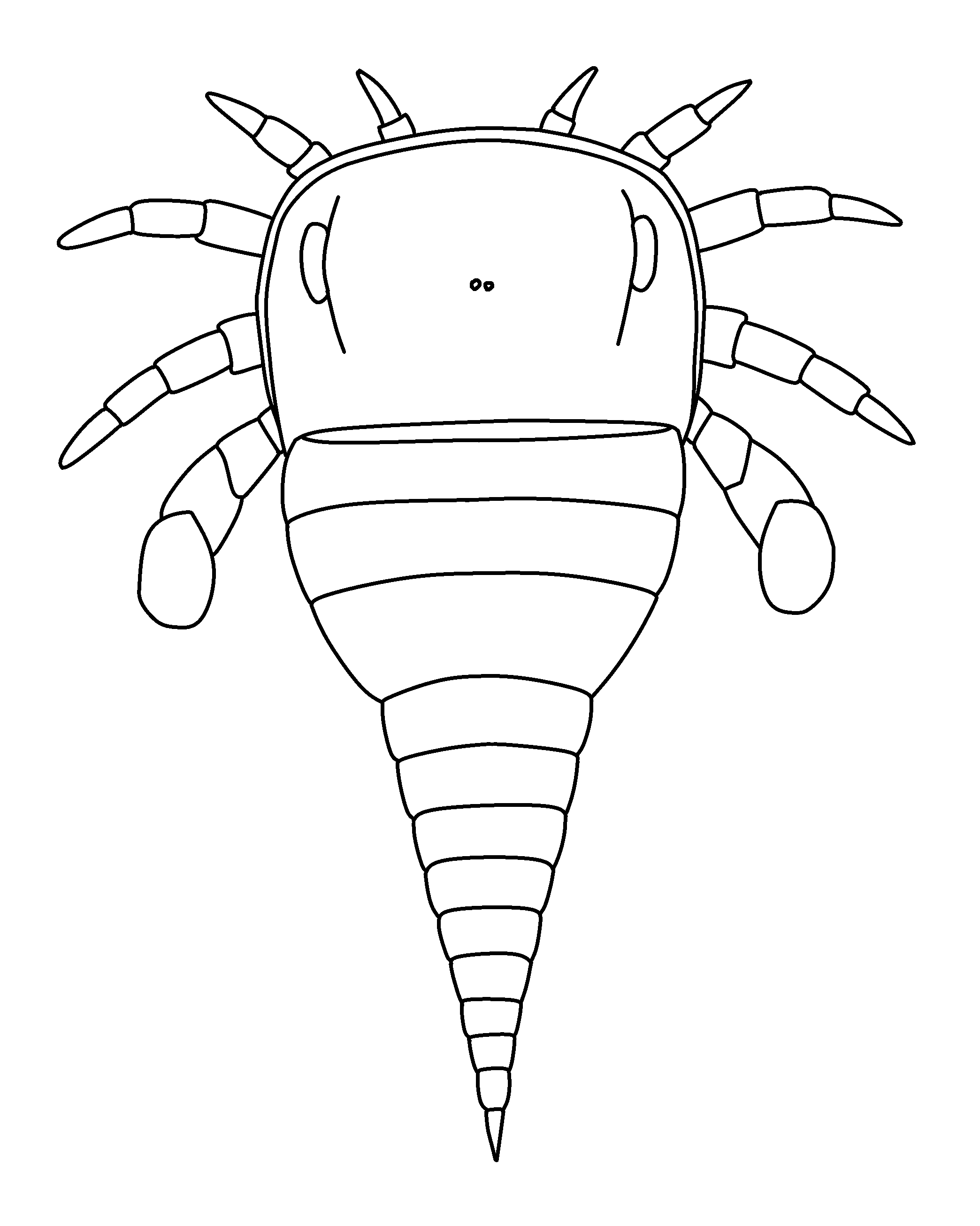
Reconstruction of Forfarella mitchelli.

Forfarella mitchelli from the early Devonian of the Forfar region in the Midland Valley of Scotland was described by Jason Dunlop and colleagues in 1999; although the fossil had actually been recognised as a chasmataspidid and provisionally labelled as such some years previously by Charles Waterston. Forfarella mitchelli is not very well preserved, but does show the characteristic chasmataspidid body plan.

=== Achanarraspis ===
The stratigraphically youngest chasmataspidid is Achanarraspis reedi, described by Lyall Anderson and colleagues in 2000, from the mid-Devonian Achanarras quarry in Caithness, Scotland, a site rich in fish fossils.

=== Octoberaspis ===
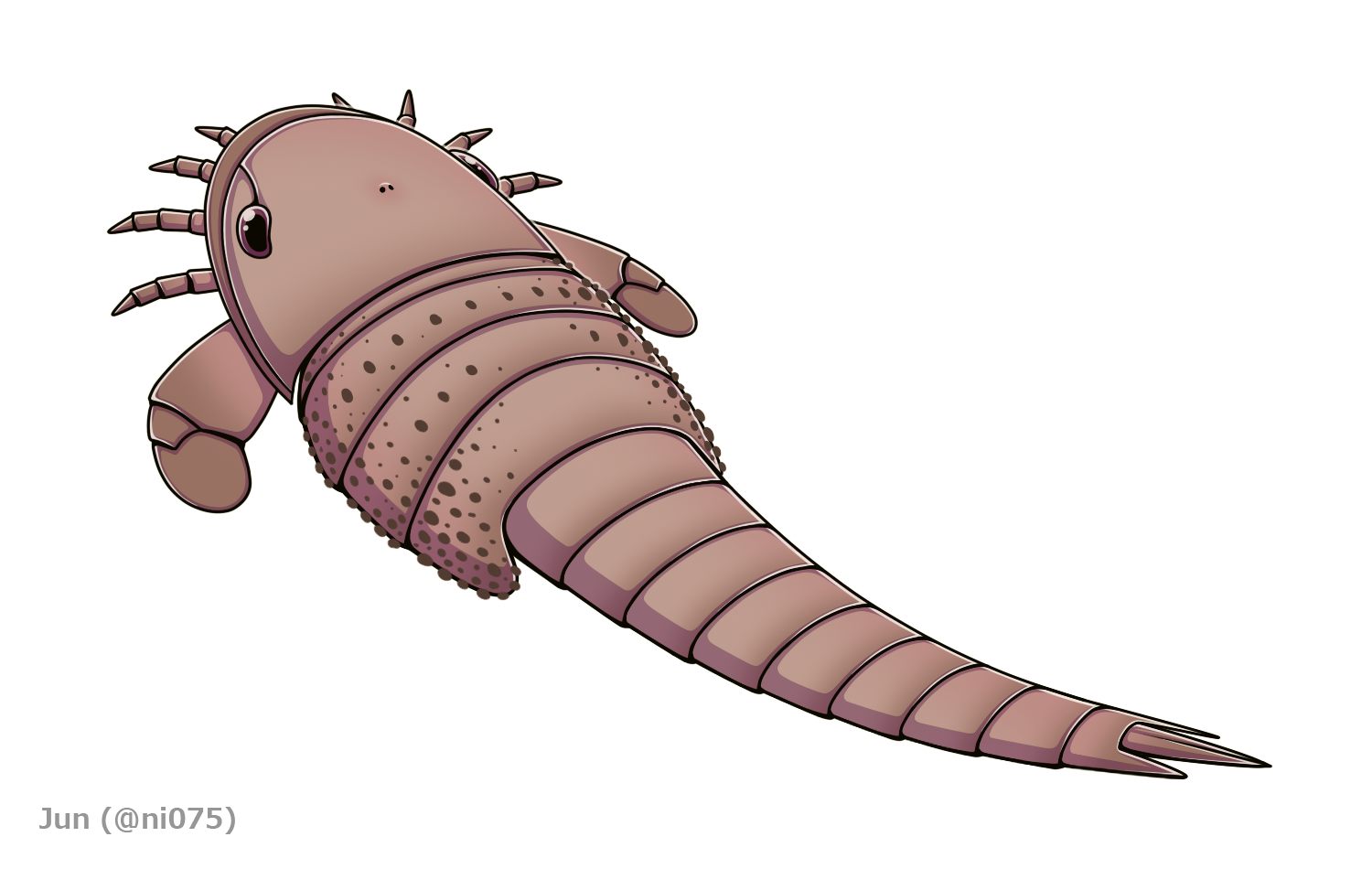
Reconstruction of Octoberaspis ushakovi

Well preserved chasmataspidids were recovered from the early Devonian of October Revolution Island, part of the Severnaya Zemlya group in the Russian Arctic. Originally briefly described as eurypterids, they were formally described as Octoberaspis ushakovi by Jason Dunlop in 2002. Octoberaspis is one of the few chasmataspidids with well-documented opisthosomal appendages, revealing that some characters previously thought to be eurypterid-exclusive were also shared by chasmataspidids as well.

=== Loganamaraspis ===
Loganamaraspis dunlopi discovered from a famous Silurian fossil locality near Lesmahagow in Scotland. Described by Erik Tetlie and Simon Braddy in 2003, it was placed in Diploaspididae, but interpreted as being somewhat more intermediate in form between the Chasmataspis and Diploaspidid body plans.

=== Dvulikiaspis ===
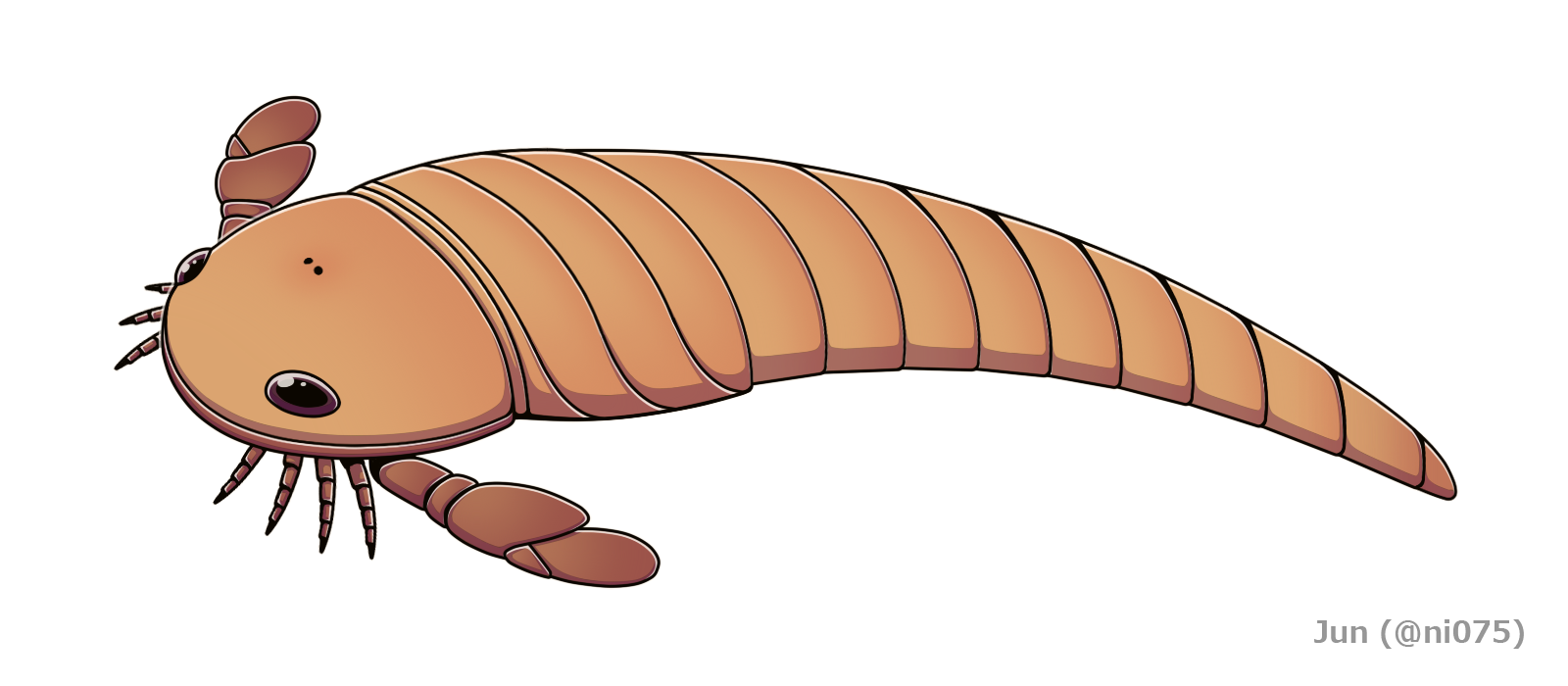
Reconstruction of Dvulikiaspis menneri

Fossils of Dvulikiaspis menneri discovered from the Imangda River of Taymyr Peninsula were originally interpreted as a species of eurypterid genus Stylonurus, and formally described as a new genus of chasmataspidid by David J. Marshall and co-authors in 2014. Dvulikiaspis menneri is one of the few well-preserved chasmataspidids, revealing the distal morphology of appendages II-VI.

=== Hoplitaspis ===
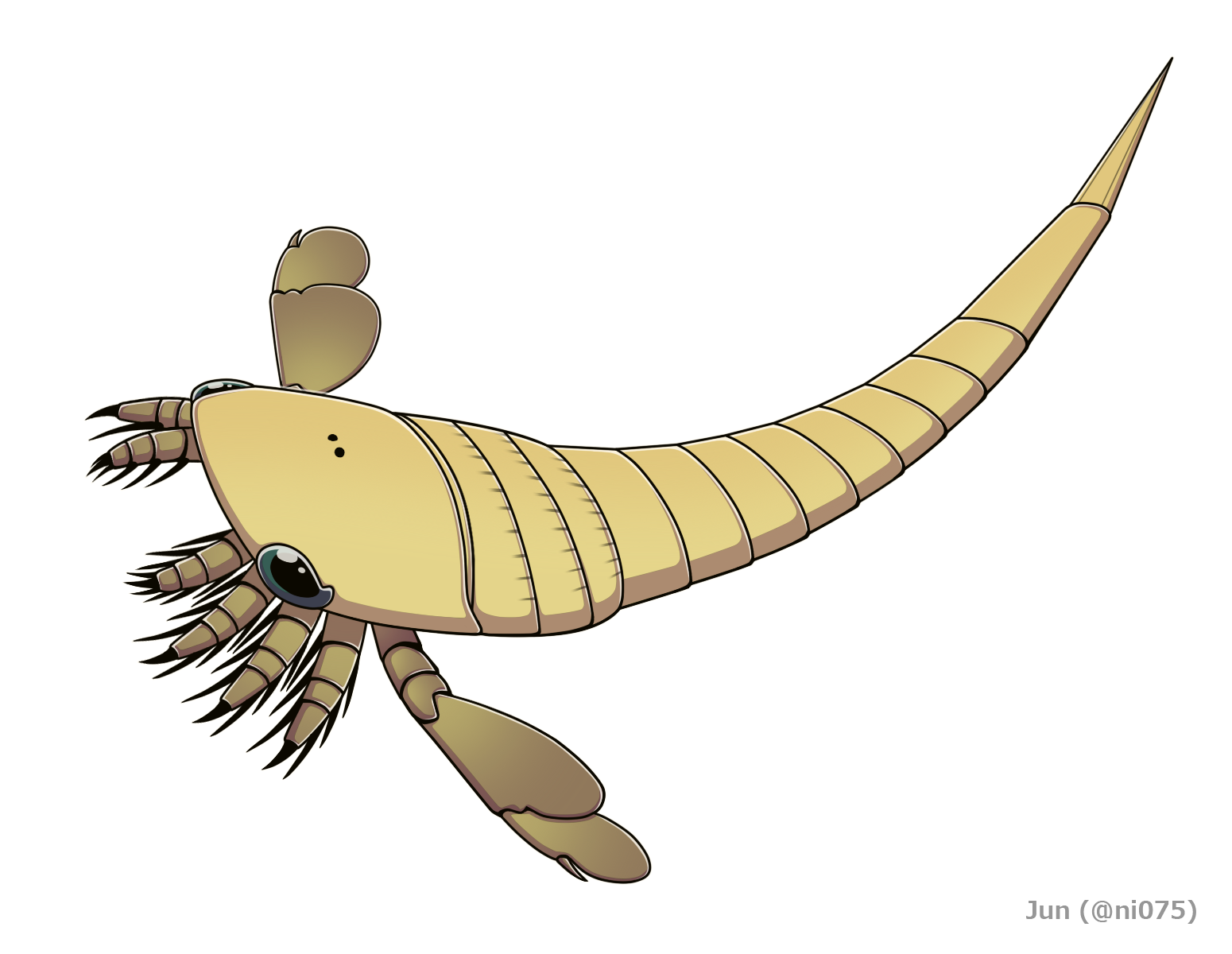
Reconstruction of Hoplitaspis hiawathai

Hoplitaspis hiawathai is the second known species of Ordovician chasmataspidid, discovered from the Big Hill Lagerstätte of Michigan in United States, described by James C. Lamsdell and co-authors in 2019. With a nearly complete set of appendages being observable, Hoplitaspis hiawathai is the most complete chasmataspidid known from that time. Each of the paddle appendages of Hoplitaspis hiawathai has a claw instead of an intersegmental element like those of other diploaspidids, providing clues on the relationship between appendage VI of Chasmataspis and diploaspidids.

== Classification ==
=== Phylogenetic position ===
- Chelicerata
  - Pycnogonida
  - Euchelicerata
    - Xiphosura
    - Dekatriata
      - †Chasmataspidida
      - Sclerophorata
        - †Eurypterida
        - Arachnida

Summarized phylogenetic position of Chasmataspidida as of the 2010s.

Chasmataspidids have a controversial phylogenetic position within Chelicerata. The first species to be discovered were thought to be unusual fossil xiphosuran, while later species were often based on specimens initially misidentified as eurypterids. Chasmataspidids had been interpreted as relatives/members of either xiphosurans or eurypterids, or forming a clade (Dekatriata) with eurypterids and arachnids. Some studies even suggest that chasmataspidids may not represent a monophyletic taxon - for example as a paraphyletic grade where the eurypterids arose; or a polyphyletic group with Chasmataspis and diploaspidids more closely related to xiphosurans and eurypterids, respectively. The polyphyletic hypothesis was based on the xiphosuran-like characters of Chasmataspis (e.g. genal spines, chelate limbs, fused opisthosomal segments) and eurypterid-like characters found on diploaspidid genera (e.g. paddles on appendage VI). However this interpretation could be unreliable, as the characters are either partially shared by both xiphosurans and eurypterids (e.g. genal spines were found in eurypterid juveniles; some xiphosurans have non-chelate limbs and unfused opisthosoma) or more likely represent a result of parallel evolution (e.g. the paddles of diploaspidids and swimming eurypterids have different component). Additionally, the monophyly of chasmataspidids could be supported by the unique component of 4-segmented preabdomen and 9-segmented postabdomen as well. As of the 2010s, many studies supports the monophyly of Chasmataspidida and Dekatriata (Chasmataspidida+Eurypterida+Arachnida).

=== Interrelationships ===
- Chasmataspidida
  - Chasmataspididae
    Chasmataspis laurencii
  - Diploaspididae
    - Loganamaraspis dunlopi
    - - Dvulikiaspis menneri
      - Achanarraspis reedi
      - - - Heteroaspis stoermeri
          - Octoberaspis ushakovi
        - - Diploaspis praecursor
          - - Diploaspis casteri
            - Diploaspis muelleri

Internal phylogeny of Chasmataspidida based on Selden, Lamsdell & Liu (2015), with addition of Diploaspis praecursor based on Lamsdell & Briggs (2017).

As of 2019, up to 12 genera had been associated within Chasmataspidida. With the exception of Diploaspis which compose of 3 species since 2017, all chasmataspidid genera are monotypic. The order Chasmataspidida subdivided into two families: Chasmataspididae and Diploaspididae. the former consists of Chasmataspis (and possibly also Kiaeria) while the latter include the remaining genera. Chasmataspididae is defined by a horseshoe-shaped carapace with distinct genal spines and a completely fused preabdomen; while Diploaspididae is defined by a semicircular to subquadrate carapace and a preabdomen with curved, non-trilobate segments.
†Chasmataspidida Caster & Brooks, 1956

- †Kiaeria Størmer, 1934 (might belong to Chasmataspididae)
  - †Kiaeria limuloides Størmer, 1934—Silurian
- †Chasmataspididae Caster & Brooks, 1956
  - †Chasmataspis Caster & Brooks, 1956
    - †Chasmataspis laurencii Caster & Brooks, 1956—Ordovician
- †Diploaspididae Størmer, 1972
  - †Achanarraspis Anderson, Dunlop & Trewin, 2000
    - †Achanarraspis reedi Anderson, Dunlop & Trewin, 2000—Devonian
  - †Diploaspis Størmer, 1972
    - †Diploaspis casteri Størmer, 1972—Devonian
    - †Diploaspis muelleri Poschmann, Anderson & Dunlop, 2005—Devonian
    - †Diploaspis praecursor Selden, Lamsdell & Liu 2015—Silurian
  - †Dvulikiaspis Marshall, Lamsdell, Shpinev & Braddy, 2014
    - †Dvulikiaspis menneri (Novojilov, 1959) (formerly known as 'Tylopterella' menneri)—Devonian
  - †Forfarella Dunlop, Anderson & Braddy, 1999
    - †Forfarella mitchelli Dunlop, Anderson & Braddy, 1999—Devonian
  - †Heteroaspis Størmer, 1972
    - †Heteroaspis stoermeri Størmer, 1972 (formerly known as 'Eurypterus' stoermeri)—Devonian
  - †Hoplitaspis Lamsdell, Gunderson & Meyer, 2019
    - †Hoplitaspis hiawathai Lamsdell, Gunderson & Meyer, 2019—Ordovician
  - †Loganamaraspis Tetlie & Braddy, 2004
    - †Loganamaraspis dunlopi Tetlie & Braddy, 2004—Silurian
  - †Nahlyostaspis Marshall, Lamsdell, Shpinev & Braddy, 2014
    - †Nahlyostaspis bergstroemi Marshall, Lamsdell, Shpinev & Braddy, 2014—Devonian
  - †Octoberaspis Dunlop, 2002
    - †Octoberaspis ushakovi Dunlop, 2002—Devonian
  - †Skrytyaspis Marshall, Lamsdell, Shpinev & Braddy, 2014
    - †Skrytyaspis andersoni Marshall, Lamsdell, Shpinev & Braddy, 2014—Devonian
