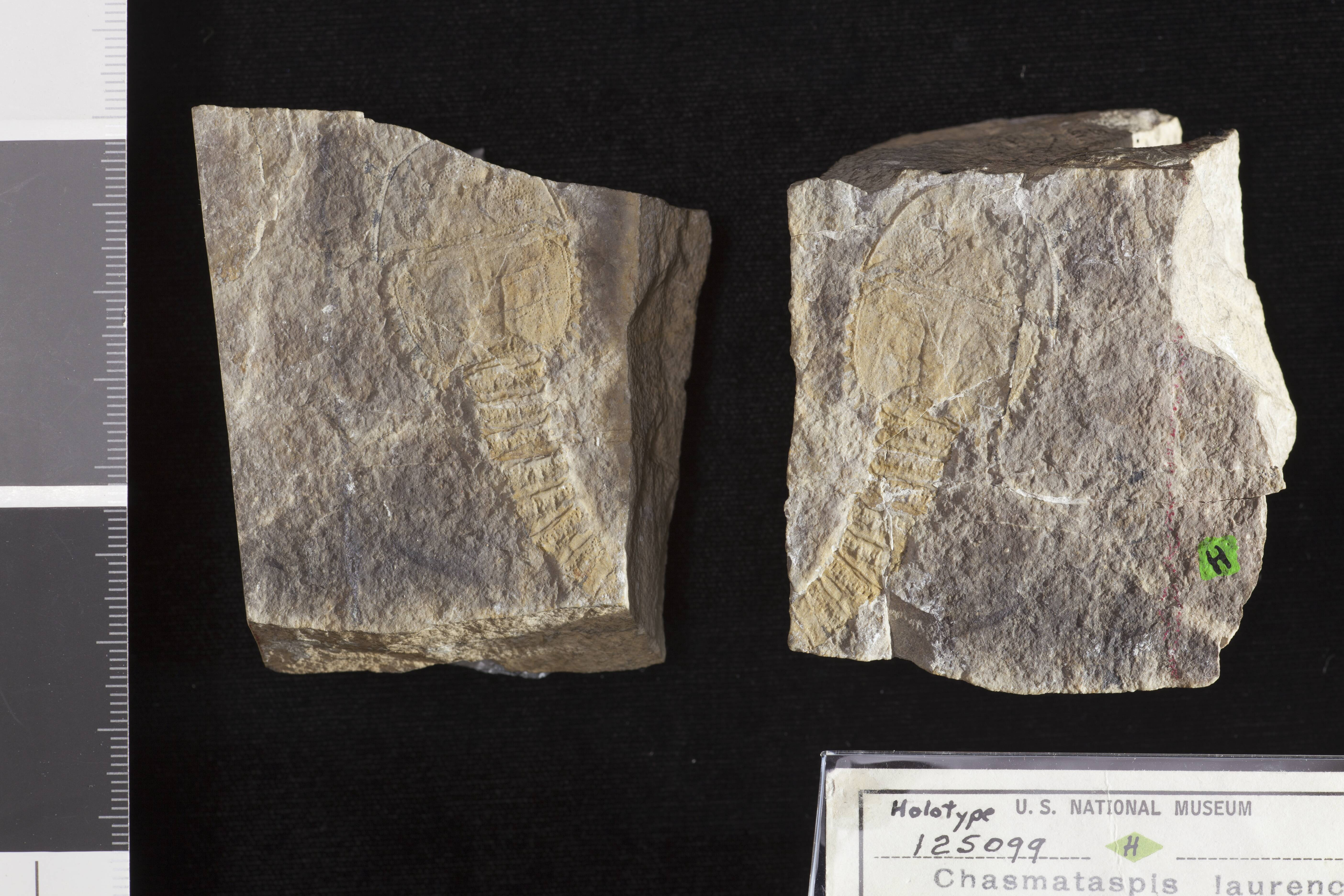
- Holotype specimen
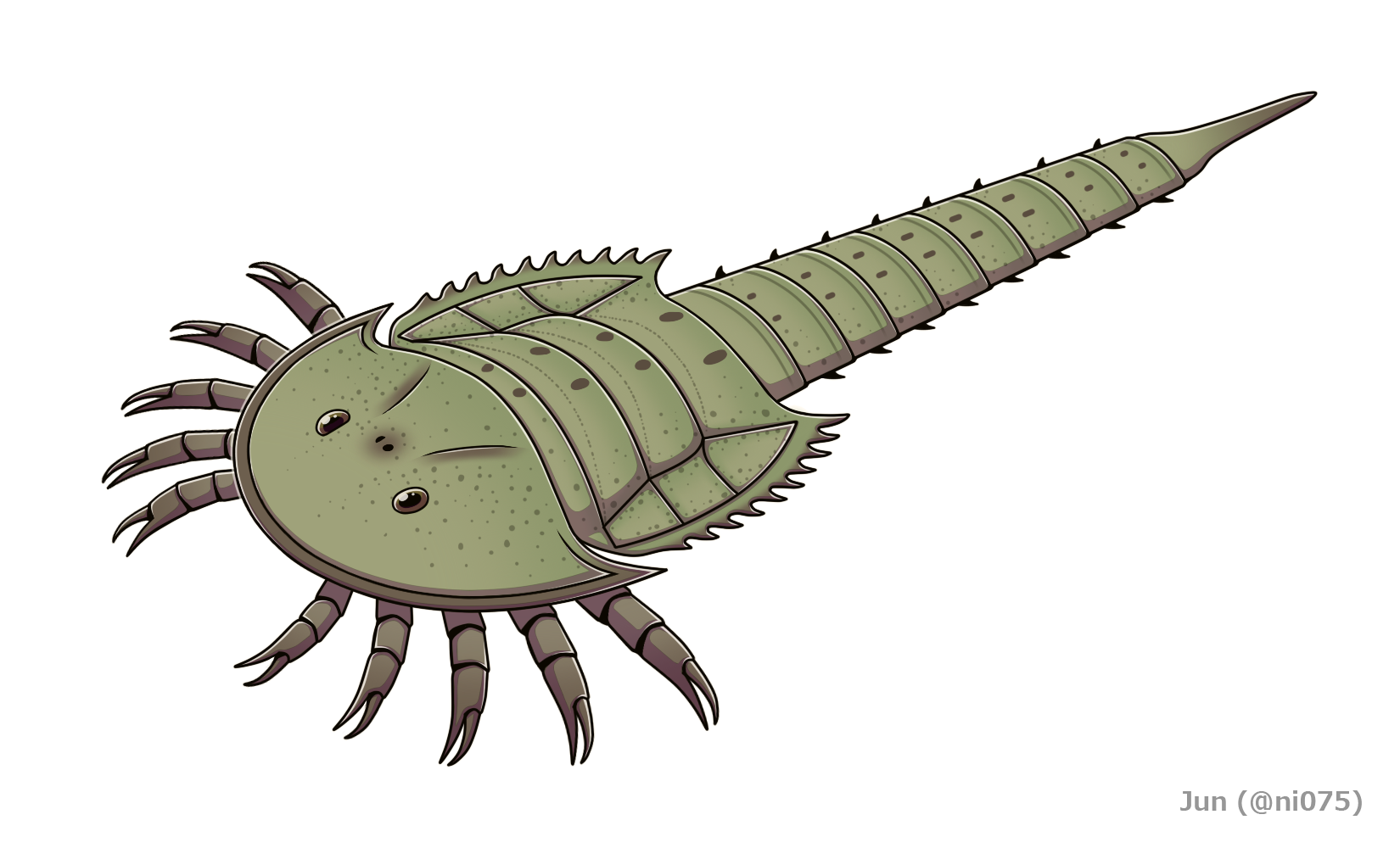
- Life reconstruction of C. laurencii

Scientific classification
- Kingdom: Animalia
- Phylum: Arthropoda
- Subphylum: Chelicerata
- Clade: Dekatriata
- Order: †Chasmataspidida
- Family: †Chasmataspididae; Caster & Brooks, 1956
- Genus: †Chasmataspis; Caster & Brooks, 1956

Type species
- †Chasmataspis laurencii Caster & Brooks, 1999

= Chasmataspis =

Chasmataspis Temporal range: Darriwilian

Extinct genus of arthropods

Chasmataspis is a genus of chasmataspidid, a group of extinct aquatic chelicerate arthropods. It was found in the Early Ordovician deposits of Tennessee, United States.

== Morphology ==
Just like other chasmataspidids, the body of Chasmataspis compose of a prosoma and a 13-segmented opisthosoma, with the latter subdivided into a 4-segmented preabdomen and a 9-segmented postabdomen. Dorsal to the carapace were pairs of ridges, lateral eyes and median ocelli. Chasmataspis characterized by a semicircular carapace (prosomal dorsal shield) with pointed genal spines and preabdomen with fused body segments. Rows of tubercles and spines run through the axial and lateral regions of opisthosoma. The body terminated with a spine-like telson.

There is no body fossils of Chasmataspis with unambiguous appendages being discovered. The only evidence were 2 specimens of disarticulated, claw-bearing appendages discovered from the same stratum which may represent the prosomal appendage (possibly appendage VI) of Chasmastaspis.
