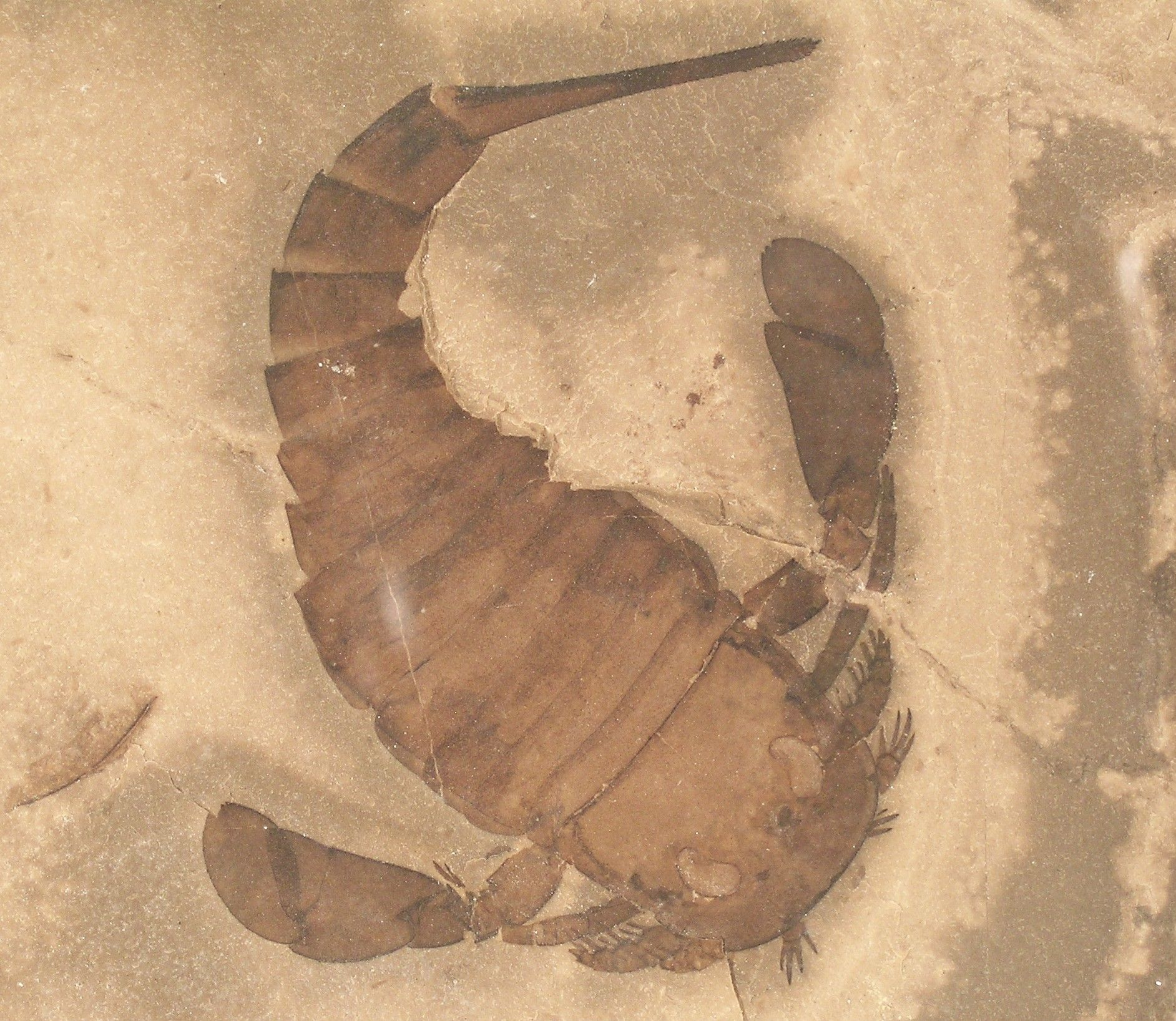
- Eurypterus remipes, a eurypterid
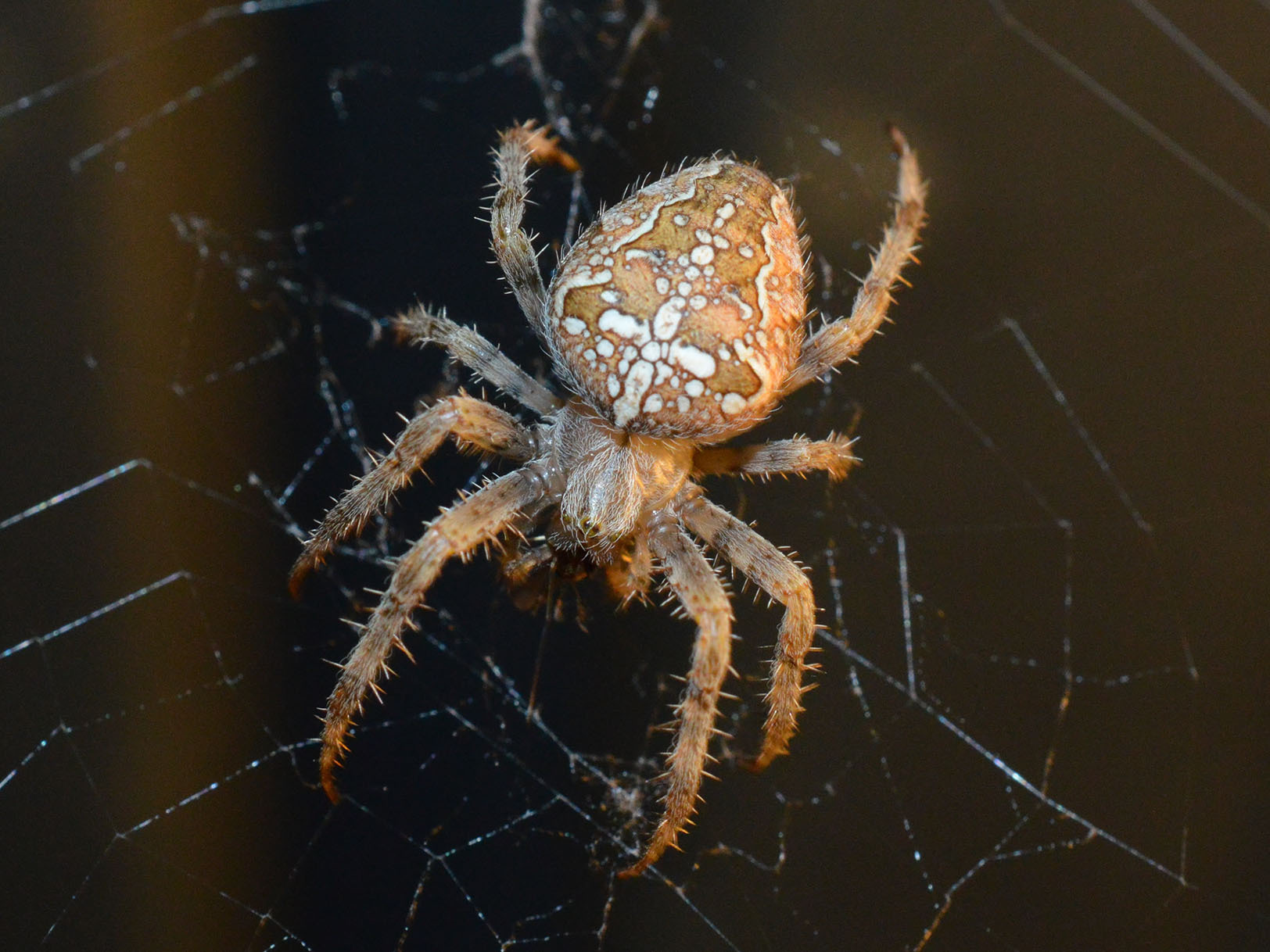
- Araneus diadematus, an arachnid

Scientific classification
- Domain: Eukaryota
- Kingdom: Animalia
- Phylum: Arthropoda
- Subphylum: Chelicerata
- Clade: Planaterga
- Clade: Dekatriata; Lamsdell, 2013

Groups
- †Houia; †Winneshiekia; †Chasmataspidida; Sclerophorata; Arachnida; †Eurypterida

= Dekatriata =

Dekatriata Temporal range: Ordovician–Recent

Taxonomical clade

Dekatriata is a clade of planatergan chelicerates including the groups Arachnida, Chasmataspidida, Eurypterida and additionally two stem-genera Winneshiekia and Houia. Dekatriata is defined by an opisthosoma with 13 segments as groundplan (the number proposed to be secondarily reduced in most arachnid orders) and fused, plate-like appendages on the first opisthosomal segment (somite VII).
