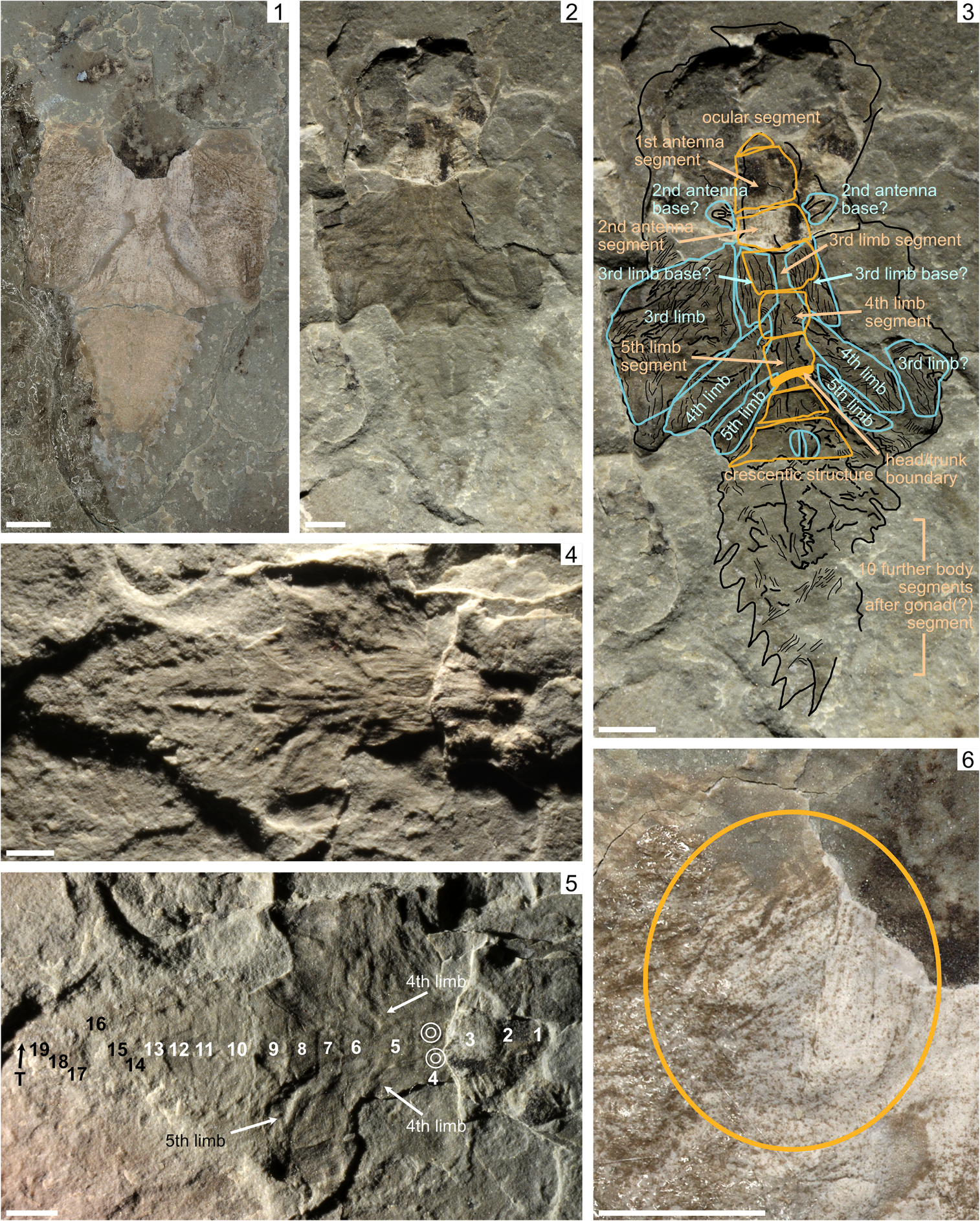
- UWGM 2655, the holotype of P. kluessendorfae

Scientific classification
- Kingdom: Animalia
- Phylum: Euarthropoda
- Genus: †Papiliomaris; Anderson et al., 2025
- Species: †P. kluessendorfae

Binomial name
- †Papiliomaris kluessendorfae Anderson et al., 2025

= Papiliomaris =

Papiliomaris kluessendorfae Temporal range: Silurian, Llandoverian (Telychian), 437.4–436.2 Ma

Extinct genus of bivalved invertebrate

Papiliomaris (IPA: [paːˈpɪ.li.oːˌma.rɪs]) (meaning "butterfly of the sea" or "sea butterfly") is a genus of bivalved (referring to the carapace) euarthropod with uncertain placement from the Silurian Waukesha Biota in Wisconsin, USA. The type and only species is Papiliomaris kluessendorfae, known from various specimens typically comprising part and counterpart fossils of the whole animal. Before this taxon was formally described, the fossils now attributed to it were referred to as the butterfly animal in the literature and informal discussions.

The specimens that are now Papiliomaris were once the subject of heavy taxonomic debate due to their unique morphology, however, a team of researchers in 2025 assigned these fossils to the species P. kluessendorfae with euarthropod placement. Even still, its exact placement within the phylum is still not fully understood, much like other contemporary euarthropods from the Waukesha Lagerstätte.

== Background ==
The Brandon Bridge Formation is a geologic formation within the state of Wisconsin that dates to the Lower Silurian (more specifically the Telychian and Sheinwoodian stages). Within the formation exists the smaller Waukesha Biota, a Konservat-Lagerstätte known for its exceptional preservation of soft-bodied and lightly sclerotized organisms that are not normally found in Silurian strata. The biota itself is found within a 12 cm (4.7 in) layer of thinly-laminated, fine-grained, shallow marine sediments consisting of mudstone and dolomite deposited within a sedimentary trap at the end of an erosional scarp over the eroded dolomites of the Schoolcraft and Burnt Bluff Formations. The site itself is known from two quarries; one in Waukesha county, and the other in the city of Franklin, in Milwaukee County. The two faunas are almost identical to one another, with the exception being that the Franklin quarry lacks any fossils of trilobites. A unique trait of the biota is its taphonomy, being that the majority of hard-shelled organisms (which are normally found in Silurian strata), are poorly preserved, or entirely absent. With the exceptions to this being the various trilobites and conulariids (a group of cnidarians with pyramidal theca) from the site. The exceptional preservation of non-biomineralized and lightly sclerotized remains of the Waukesha Biota is generally attributed to a combination of favorable conditions, including the transportation of organisms to a sediment trap that helped to protect from scavengers, and promoted the build up of organic films that coated the surfaces of the dead organisms, which inhibited decay, sometimes enhanced by promoting precipitation of a thin phosphatic coating, which is observed on many of the fossils. However, some of the fossils are also coated with other materials, including pyrite and calcium carbonate.

== History ==
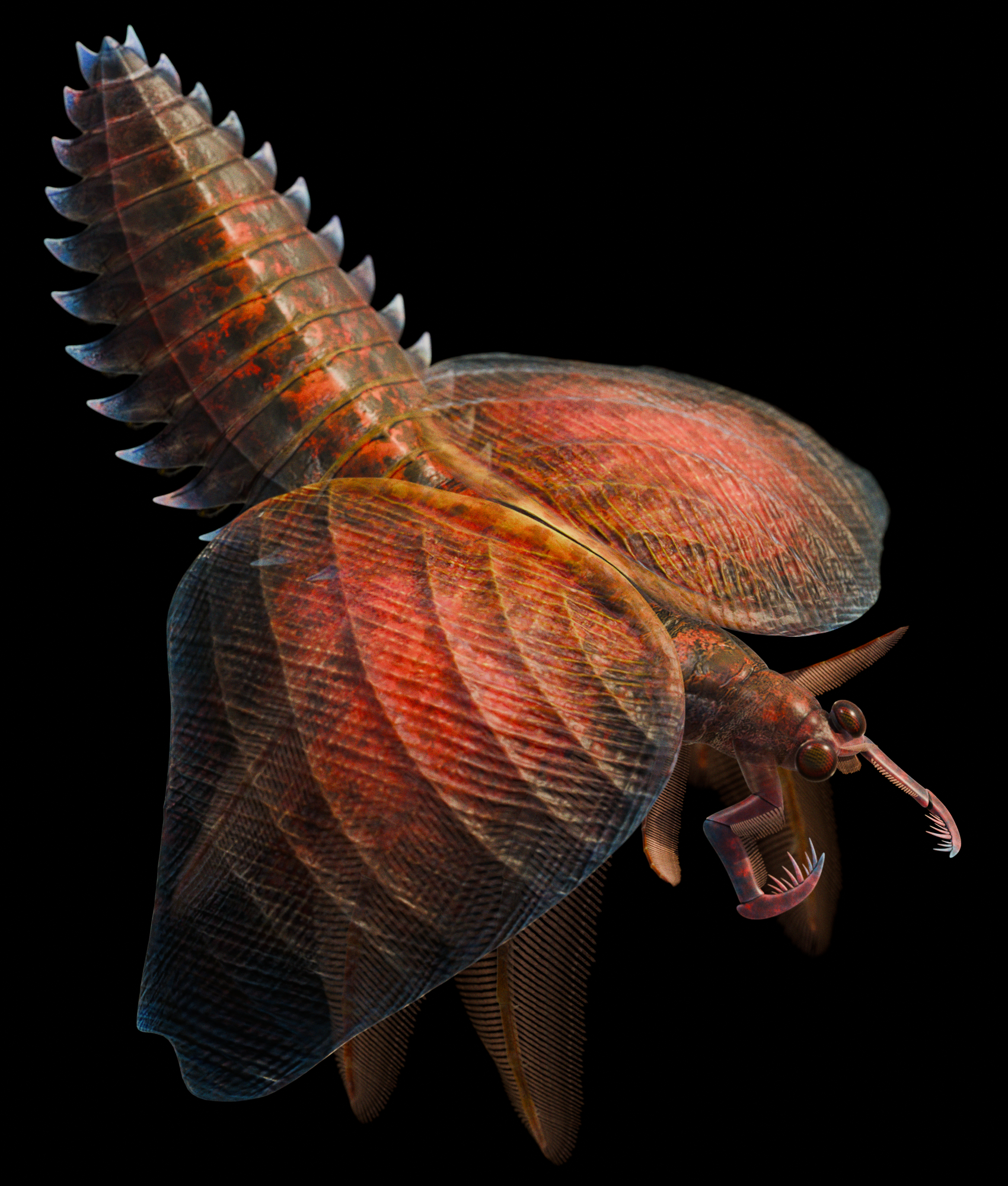
Speculative life reconstruction of Papiliomaris kluessendorfae following Anderson et al., (2025).

By published accounts, fossils of Papiliomaris were first found in 1985 by paleontologists Donald G. Mikulic, Derek E. G. Briggs, and Joanne Kluessendorf who described it as a "Bizzare arthropod with a possibly bivalved carapace" referring to the specimen UWGM 2719 (then known as UW 4001/5) in the description paper of the Waukesha biota. Before its formal description in 2025, the animal was referred to by the name 'butterfly animal' in previous studies. It was also named as "Papiliomaris kluessendorfae" (originally a nomen nudum) in a 2020 conference abstract by Rosbach and colleagues. All three of the authors from this team (Stephanie A. Rosbach, Evan P. Anderson, and James D. Schiffbauer) would go on to formally describe the taxon under the same name with the addition of Mikaela A. Pulsipher and Donald G. Mikulic.

== Description ==
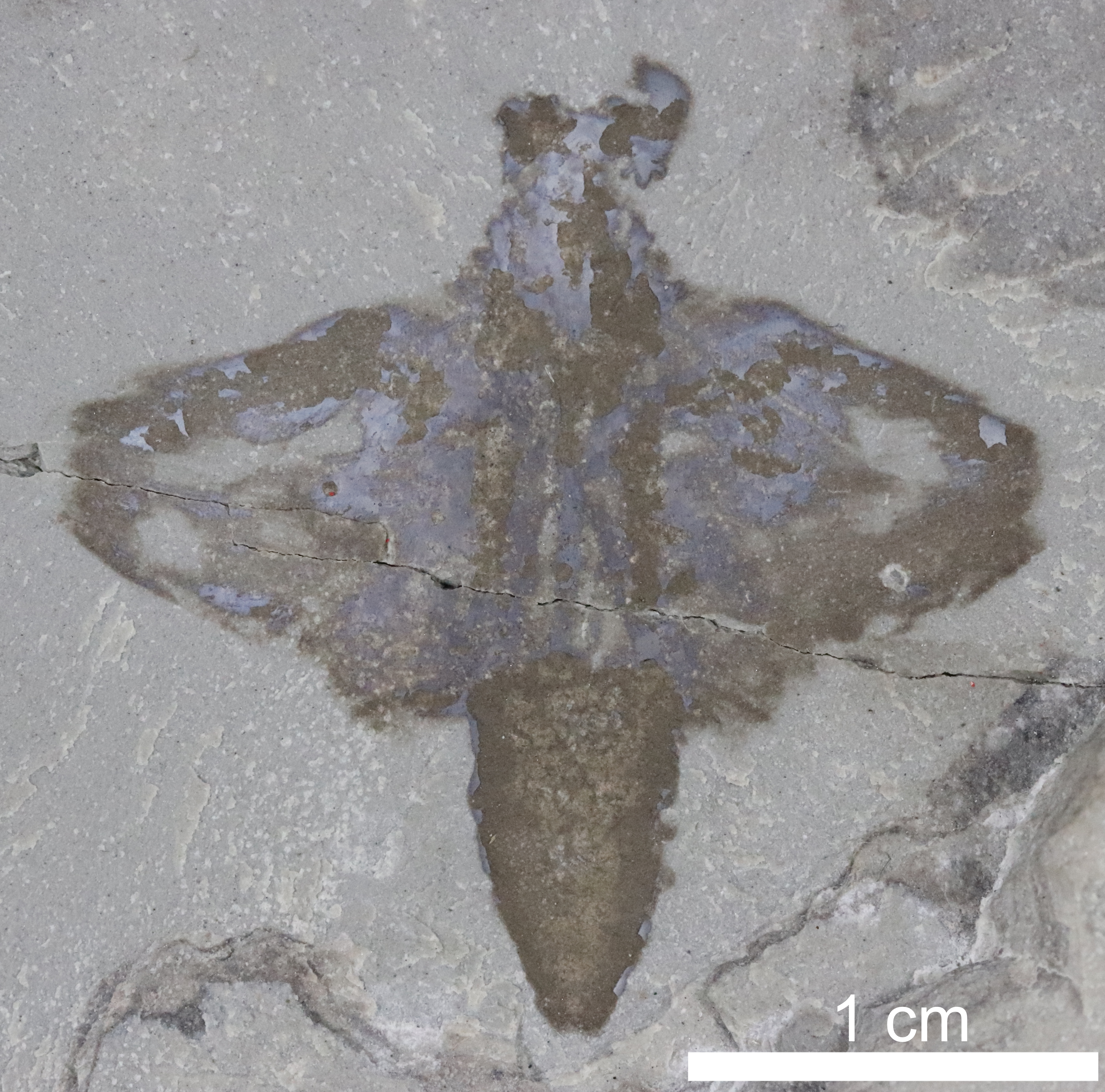
UWGM 2719, the first specimen of Papiliomaris found, described by Mikulic et al., (1985)

Anderson and colleagues referred twelve specimens to Papiliomaris kluessendorfae in their 2025 descriptive paper. Of these, they named UWGM 2655 as the holotype, and UWGM 2633 and UWGM 2654 as paratypes. All three consist of a part and counterpart fossil. Although fossils previously identified as a "Bizarre arthropod with a possibly bivalved carapace" in 1985 included specimens with a total width up to 20 centimetres (7.9 in) lacking a cephalic and trunk area, specimens identified to belong to Papiliomaris in 2025 ranges length of 11.5–20.8 millimetres (0.45–0.82 in) long and width of 8.8–17.4 millimetres (0.35–0.69 in).

Anderson et al., (2025) made numerous observations about the anatomy of Papiliomaris based on these twelve specimens. They found it to have two tagmata: a six-somite (segment) cephalon with a bivalved carapace (a carapace consisting of two halves that meet in a dorsal hinge, also seen in ostracods) that covered three to four posterior head appendages, and a trunk comprising 10−13 segments which terminated in a reduced telson. The valves are described as being near circular to ellipsoid in shape and attached anteriorly in the vicinity of the fourth or fifth cephalic somite, with the remaining portion of the hinge being detached from the cephalon. Towards the front of the cephalon are uniramous antennae on the second and third somites, the first pair being setae-dense robust antennae, with the second pair being delicate and elongate with closely set rows of setae.

The posterior three cephalic limbs are elongate and somewhat flexible with at least two rows of filamentous setae, the third of these elongate appendages — found on the sixth somite — being noticeably smaller compared to the two preceding it. The tergites on these somites possessing a raised central ridge on the dorsal side, with small pleurae extending posterodistally from each tergite. The limbs of the trunk were homogenous bifurcated rod-like or uniramous paddle trunk limbs.

=== Etymology ===
The generic name, 'Papiliomaris' (IPA: [paːˈpɪ.li.oːˌma.rɪs]), comes from the Latin word 'pāpiliō' (IPA: [paːˈpɪ.li.oː]) translating to butterfly or moth, and the Latin word 'maris' (IPA: [ˈma.rɪs]) — which is the genitive of 'mare' (IPA: [ˈma.rɛ]) — that refers to things related to the sea. This creates a name that translates into english as 'butterfly of the sea' or 'sea butterfly'. It also pays homage to previous literature on the Waukesha fossils that nicknamed the organism 'the butterfly animal', owing to its butterfly-like appearance.

The specific name 'kluessendorfae' (IPA: [ˈklʏ.sen.dɔːf.eɪ]) is in honor and memoriam of Joanne Kluessendorf, whose contributions were paramount to the discovery, description, and understanding of the sedimentology and palaeontology of the Waukesha Lagerstätte and Brandon Bridge Formation.

== Classification ==
Before Anderson et al., (2025), the taxonomic position of Papiliomaris went through several different interpretations before its formal description in 2025. For example, the description paper of the Waukesha Biota suggested a relation to crustaceans, namely members of the phyllocarida group, however, this suggestion was tentative due to the bizarre anatomy of the taxon. Another interpretation, by Jones et al., 2015b, proposed a placement within the marrellomorpha, which would make this taxon the first confirmed post-Cambrian occurrence of the group in North America (this was before the description of the definitive marrellomorph Tomlinsonus dimitrii by Moysiuk et al., 2022, from upper Ordovician strata from Ontario). However, the formal description of Papiliomaris, which was published by Anderson et al., (2025), favored the bivalved arthropod interpretation, and placed it within the euarthropoda, however its exact placement is not fully understood.

Anderson et al., (2025) performed five different Bayesian inference phylogenetic analyses that tested the placement of Papiliomaris. This was done due to the uncertain morphology of specific characters caused by the state of preservation in the fossils, specifically whether the anterior ornament was coded as a carapace, how the structure of the second head appendage — the endopod — was coded, and interpretation of the trunk limbs. The team opted to test four different hypotheses with one extra serving as a control: 'Papilio-BiCar' coded the carapace as bivalved, uncertain identity of the 2nd head appendage, and biramous trunk limbs; 'Papilio-UniCar' was the same except coding the trunk limbs as uniramous; 'Papilio-BiCar2' coded the carapace as bivalved, reduced endopod identity of the 2nd head appendage, and biramous trunk limbs; 'Papilio-UniCar2' was the same except coding the trunk limbs as uniramous. The control (Papilio-C) coded all three structures as 'uncertain'.

In both trees recovered, Papiliomaris nests within a stem-group of other animals from the Waukesha Biota at the base of Mandibulata. The control and 'Papilio-BiCar2' independently produced 'Tree A' which recovered it as sister to Mandibulata in a clade comprising Acheronauta, Thylacocephala, and Captopodus. The other three hypotheses all independently produced 'Tree B' which recovered it as sister to the clade containing Mandibulata, Acheronauta, Thylacocephala, and Captopodus.

Both trees are reproduced below:

Tree A

- Euarthropoda
  - - Yohoia
    - - Jianfengia
      - - Sklerolibyon
        - - Parapeytoia
          - Fortiforceps
  - - - Haikoucaris
      - Leanchoiliidae
    - - - Chelicerata
        - - Artiopoda
          - - Parioscorpio
            - - - Papiliomaris
                - - Acheronauta
                  - - Thylacocephala
                    - Captopodus
              - Mandibulata

Tree B

- Euarthropoda
  - - Yohoia
    - - Jianfengia
      - - Sklerolibyon
        - - Parapeytoia
          - Fortiforceps
  - - - Haikoucaris
      - Leanchoiliidae
    - - - Chelicerata
        - - Artiopoda
          - - Parioscorpio
            - - - Papiliomaris
                - - - Acheronauta
                    - - Thylacocephala
                      - Captopodus
                  - Mandibulata
