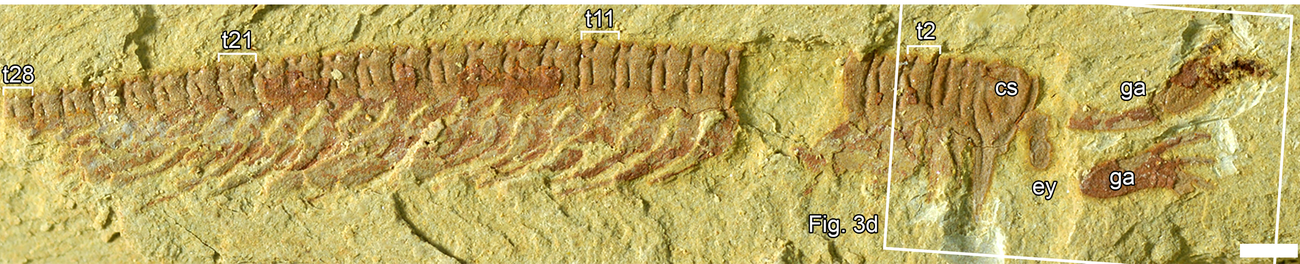
- Holotype specimen
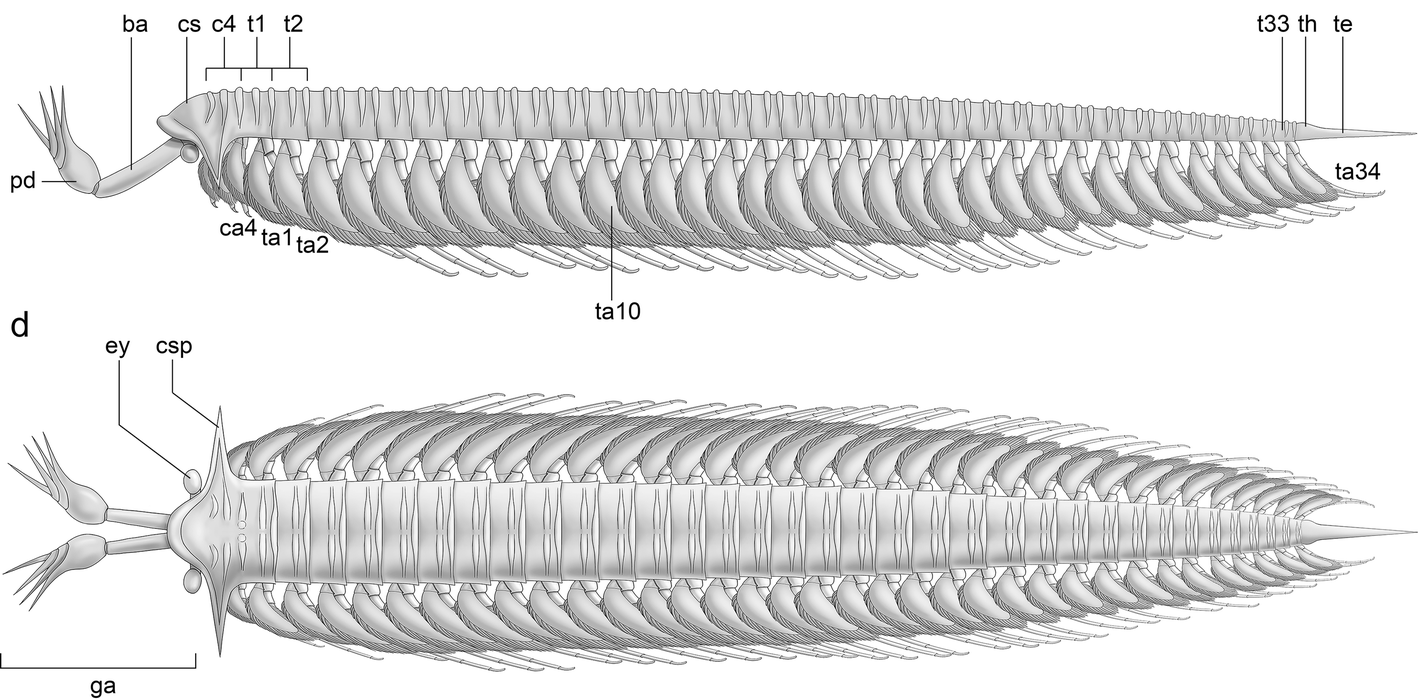
- Diagrammatic reconstruction

Scientific classification
- Kingdom: Animalia
- Phylum: Arthropoda
- Class: †Megacheira
- Family: †Jianfengiidae
- Genus: †Sklerolibyon; Aria et al., 2020
- Species: †S. maomima

Binomial name
- †Sklerolibyon maomima Aria et al., 2020

= Sklerolibyon =

Sklerolibyon Temporal range: Cambrian Stage 3

Extinct genus of megacheiran

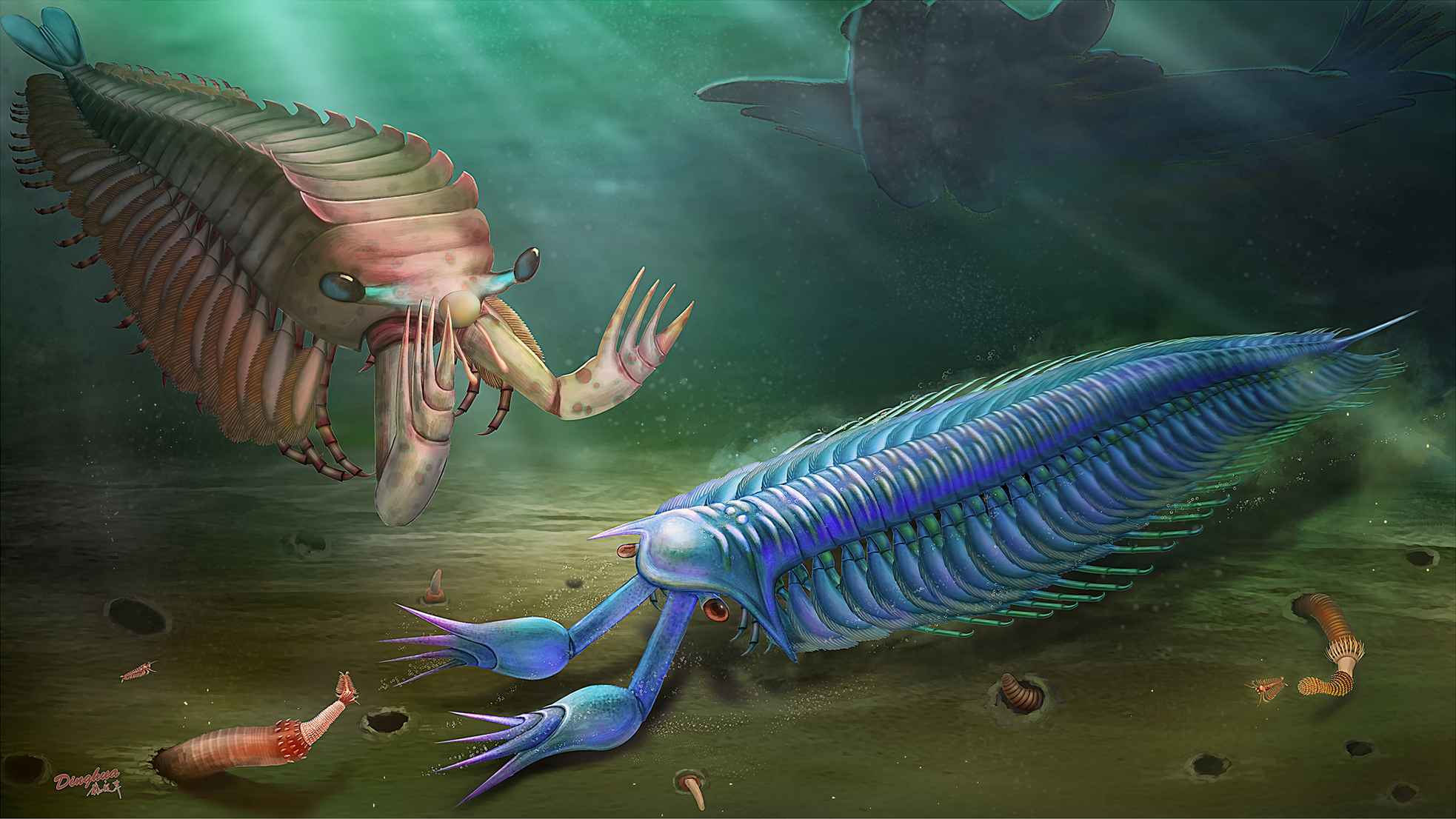
Restoration of Sklerolibyon (right) and close relative Fortiforceps (left)

Sklerolibyon is an extinct genus of megacheiran marine arthropod, known from the Cambrian aged Chengjiang biota of Yunnan, China. It is a member of the family Jianfengiidae, alongside Jianfengia and Fortiforceps, and possibly also Parapeytoia. Specimens are around 2.5 centimetres (0.98 in) in length. The body is greatly elongated, and head shield is heavily sclerotised, with a pair of spines radiating outward from the sides. Alongside the pair of great appendages, there are a pair of stalked eyes and at least two other pairs of limbs on the cephalon. The trunk has 34 segments with corresponding biramous appendages, with typically megacheiran paddle-shaped exopods. The tail is unknown but like Jianfengia probably ended in a telson spine.
