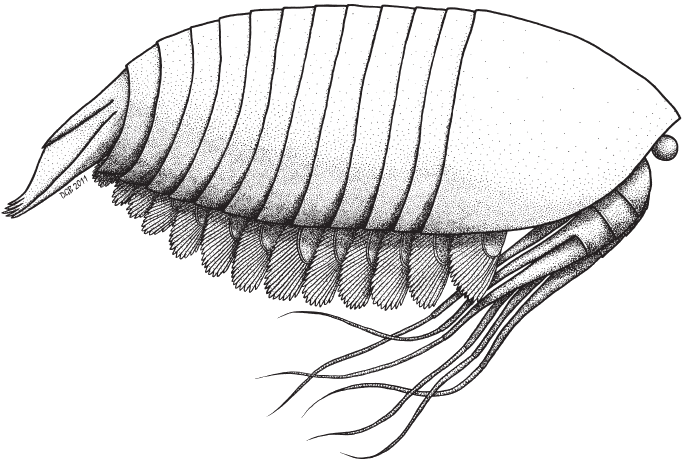
- Life restoration based on original description

Scientific classification
- Kingdom: Animalia
- Phylum: Arthropoda
- Class: †Megacheira
- Order: †Leanchoilida
- Family: †Leanchoiliidae
- Genus: †Oestokerkus; Edgecombe et al., 2011
- Species: †O. megacholix

Binomial name
- †Oestokerkus megacholix Edgecombe et al., 2011

= Oestokerkus =

Oestokerkus Temporal range: Cambrian Stage 4

Extinct genus of arthropods

Oestokerkus is an extinct genus of Cambrian megacheiran marine arthropod known from the Emu Bay Shale of Kangaroo Island, Australia. It belongs to the family Leanchoiliidae. It had a large head shield that was more than a third of the trunk's length, as well as a pair of large eyes. The great appendages have long flagellae projecting from them. The head shield probably had two pairs of cephalic appendages. The trunk has 11 segments. The exopods of the biramous limbs are fringed with long setae. The body ended with a telson, which was probably dorsally flattened.
