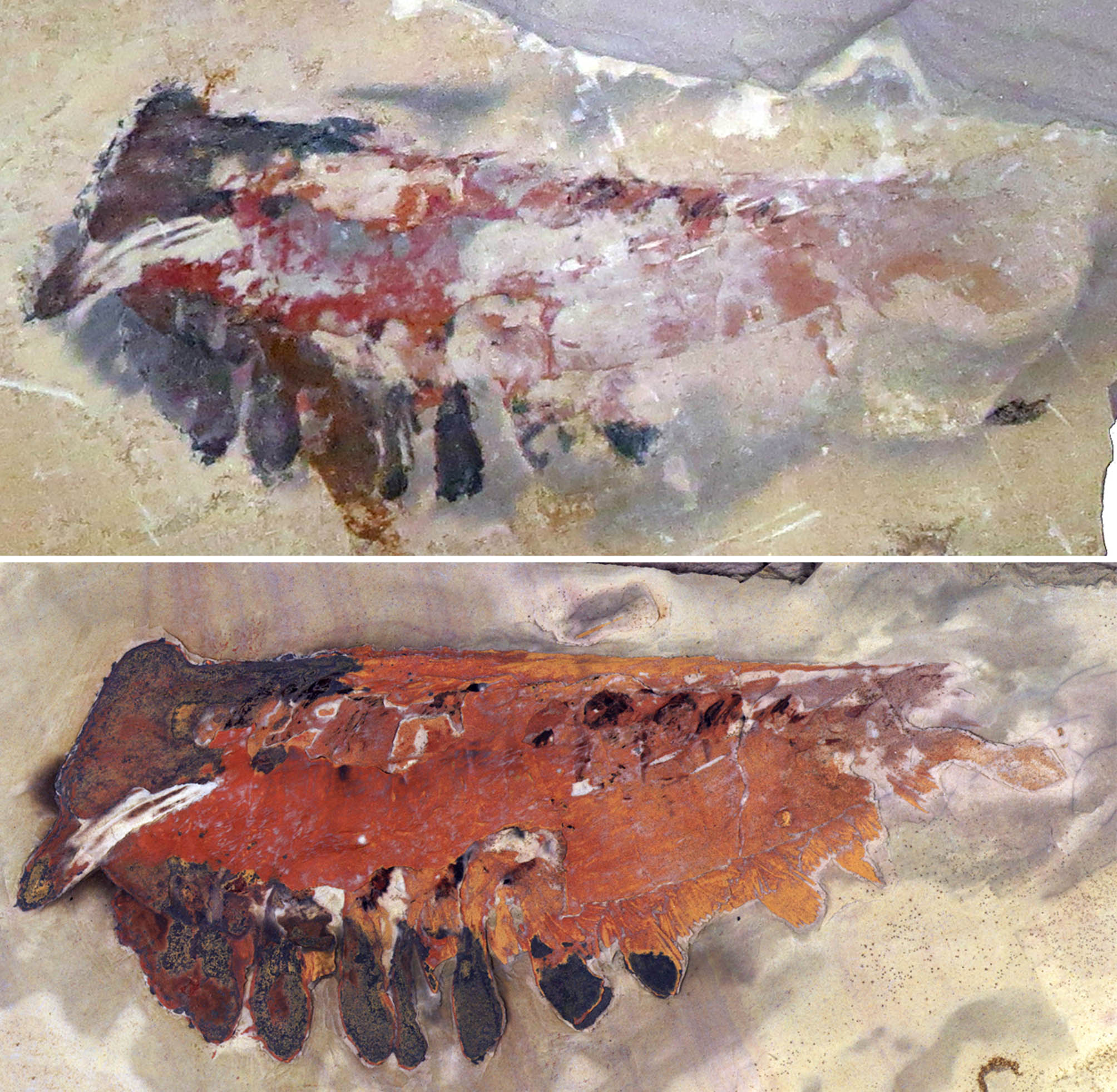
- Holotype specimen

Scientific classification
- Kingdom: Animalia
- Phylum: Arthropoda
- Class: †Megacheira
- Clade: †Cheiromorpha
- Order: †Leanchoilida
- Family: †Leanchoiliidae
- Genus: †Kanoshoia; Lerosey-Aubril et al., 2020

Species
- K. rectifrons Lerosey-Aubril et al., 2020

= Kanoshoia =

Kanoshoia Temporal range: Mid Cambrian:

Extinct genus of arthropods

Kanoshoia is an extinct genus of megacheiran arthropod from the mid Cambrian Wheeler Formation of western Utah, containing one species, Kanoshoia rectifrons. It was placed in the family Leanchoiliidae.
