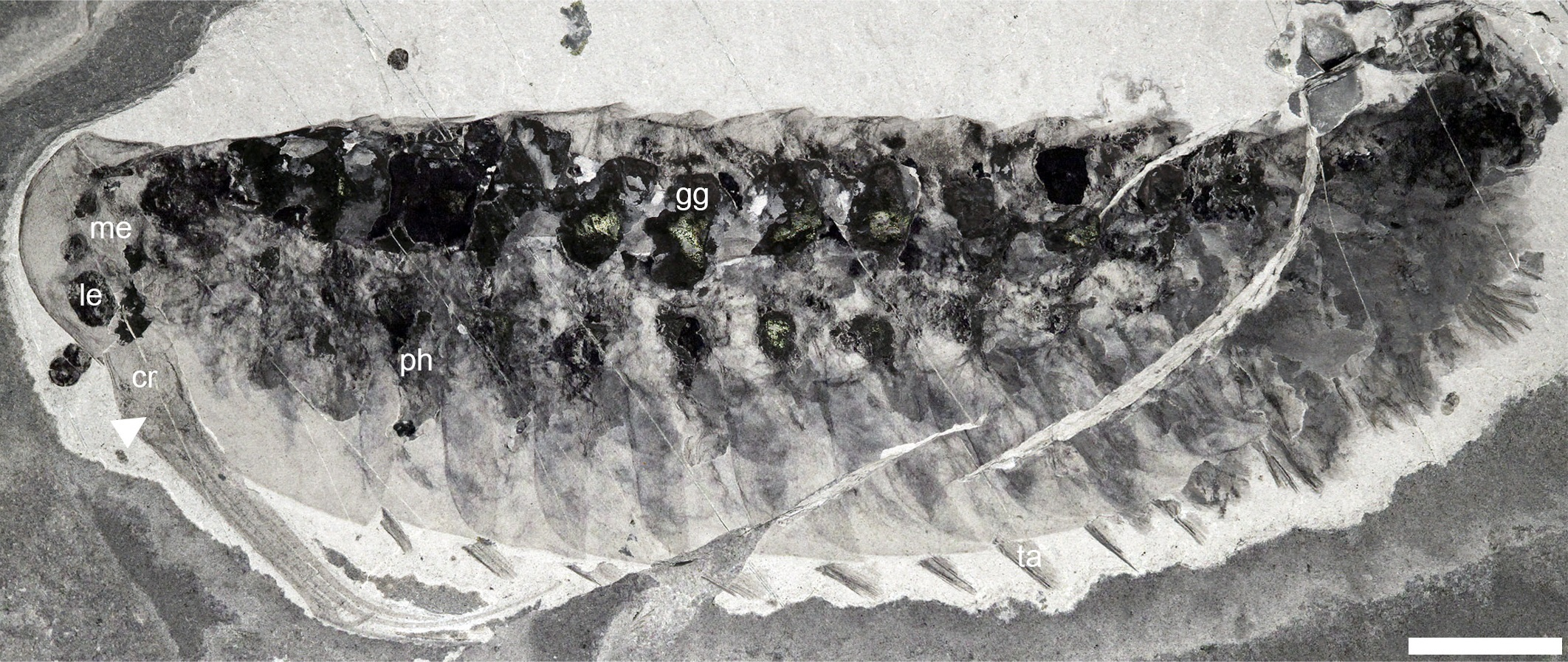
- Fossil paratype
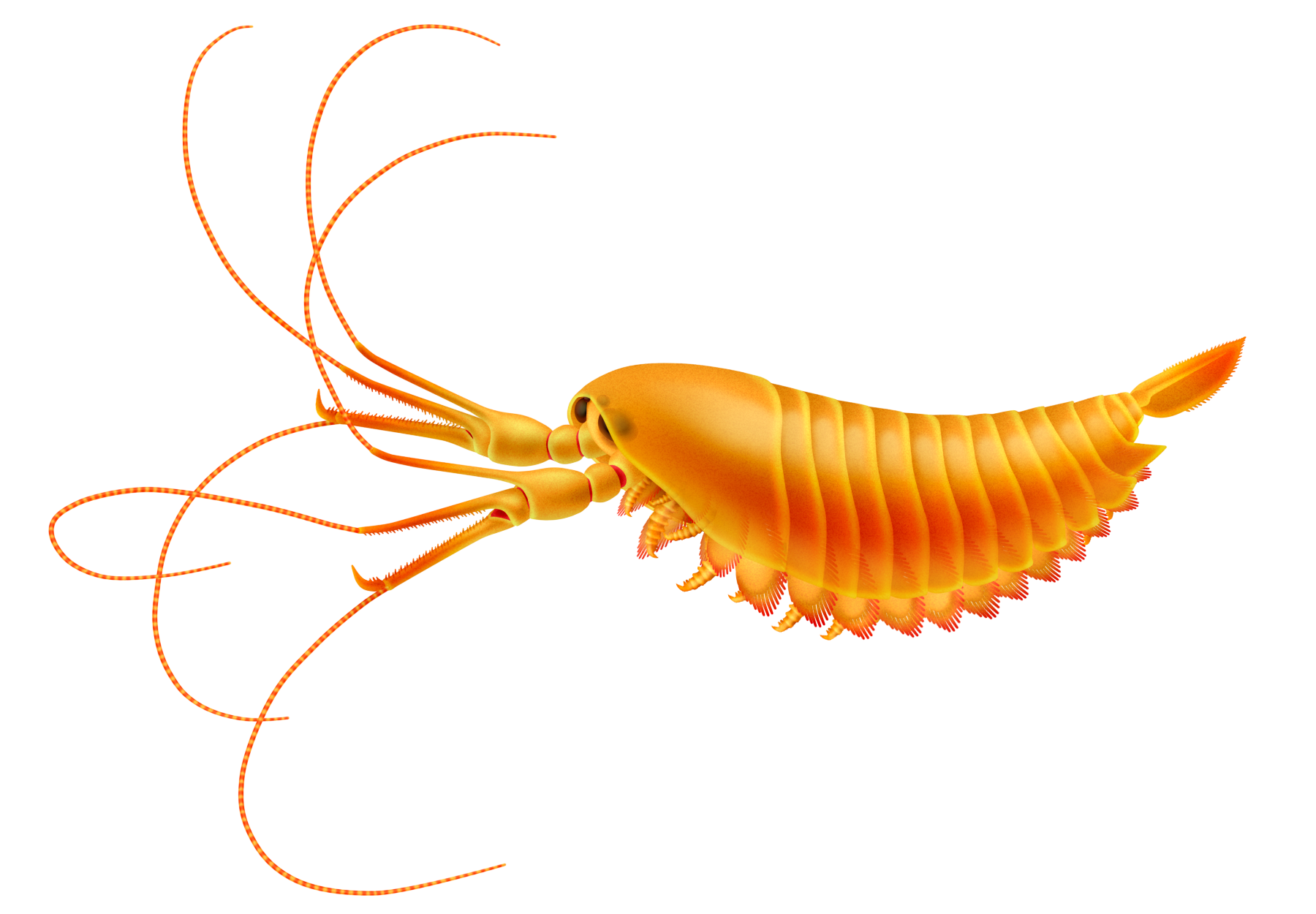
- Life reconstruction

Scientific classification
- Kingdom: Animalia
- Phylum: Arthropoda
- Class: †Megacheira
- Order: †Leanchoilida
- Family: †Leanchoiliidae
- Genus: †Yawunik; Aria et al., 2015

Type species
- †Yawunik kootenayi Aria et al., 2015

= Yawunik =

Yawunik Temporal range: Cambrian Stage 4, ~508 Ma

Extinct genus of arthropods

Yawunik is an extinct genus of Cambrian megacheiran ("Great appendage" arthropod) known from the Burgess Shale in Canada ( Marble Canyon locality). The type species has been named Yawunik kootenayi after the Kootenay, both a geographic area (and National Park, where the fossil was found) and North American First Nation, also known as the Ktunaxa. The genus name is derived from Yawuʔnik̓, the name of a primordial sea monster in Ktunaxa mythology. The fossil dates back to 508 million years ago.

== Description ==
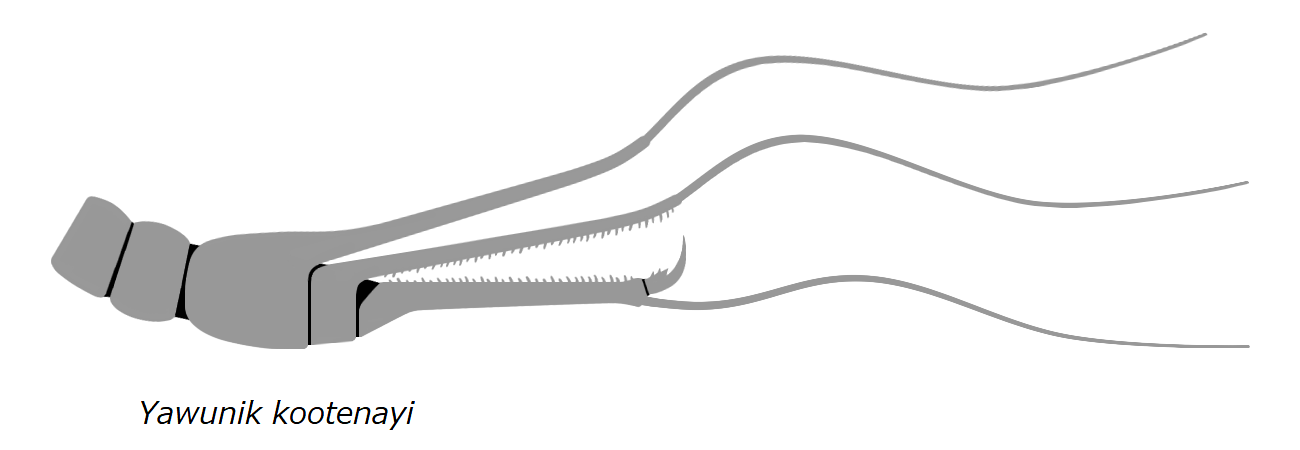
Great appendage of Y. kootenayi, showing teeth to grasp prey

Yawunik was large for a megacheiran, up to 11.66 centimetres (4.59 in) long not including the great appendages. It had four eyes; two in the anteriormost position of the head, as well as lateral eyes which were larger. Yawunik differs from other leanchoilids such as Leanchoilia by having numerous teeth on the last two rami of the great appendage, which were likely used to grasp prey.
