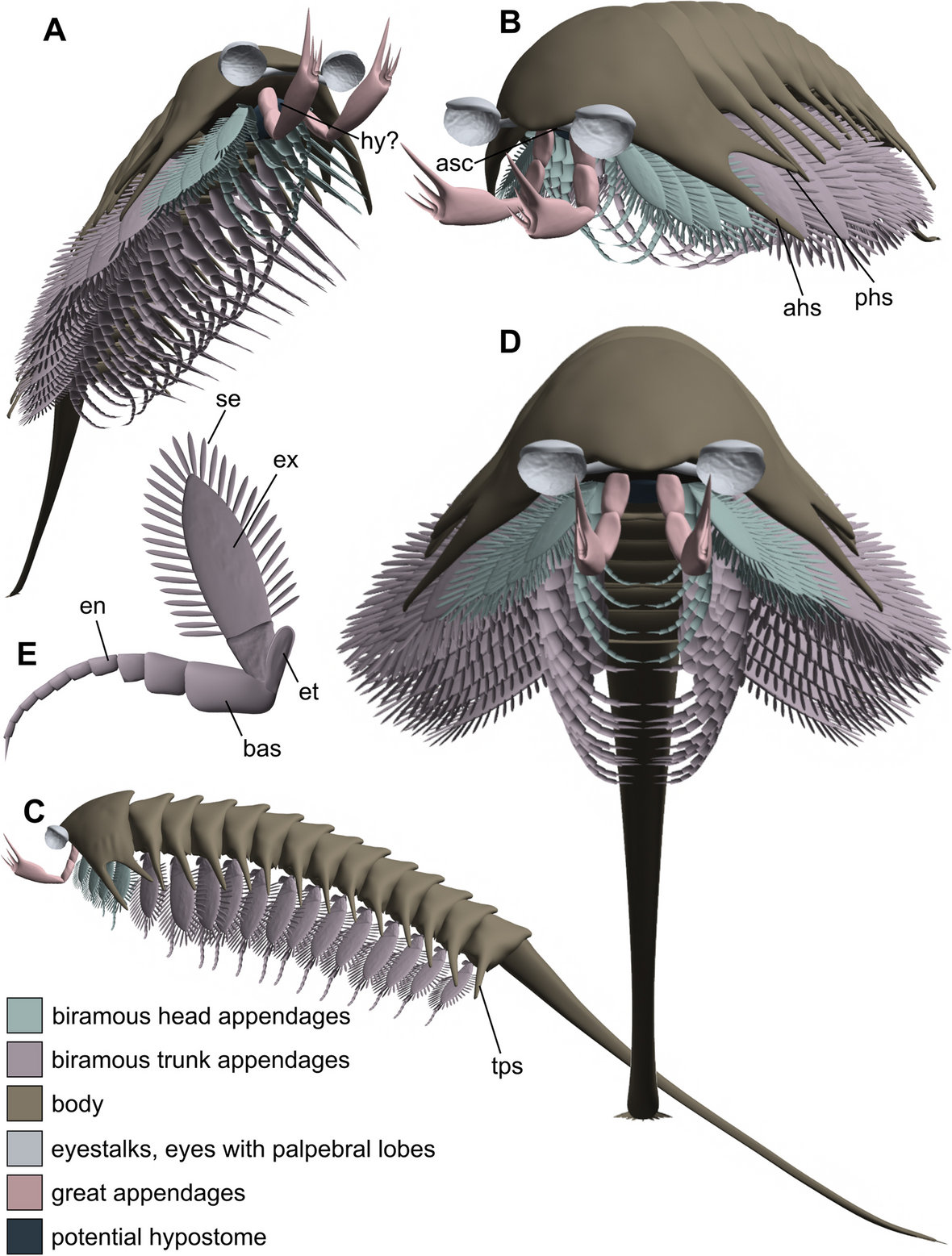
- 3D model of Tanglangia longicaudata

Scientific classification
- Kingdom: Animalia
- Phylum: Arthropoda
- Class: †Megacheira
- Genus: †Tanglangia; Luo & Hu in Luo et al., 1999

Type species
- †Tanglangia longicaudata Luo & Hu in Luo et al., 1999

Other species
- †T. rangatanga Paterson, Edgecombe & Jago, 2015

= Tanglangia =

Tanglangia Temporal range: Cambrian Stage 3–Cambrian Stage 4

Extinct genus of megacheiran arthropods

Tanglangia is an extinct genus of megacheiran arthropod that lived during the 3rd and 4th stages of the Cambrian period. The genus contains two species, T. longicaudata (the type species) and T. rangatanga, both of which are known from fossils found in the Maotianshan and Emu Bay shales respectively. The largest specimens grew up to around 3.5 cm (1.378 in) in body length.

== See also ==
- List of Chengjiang Biota species by phylum
