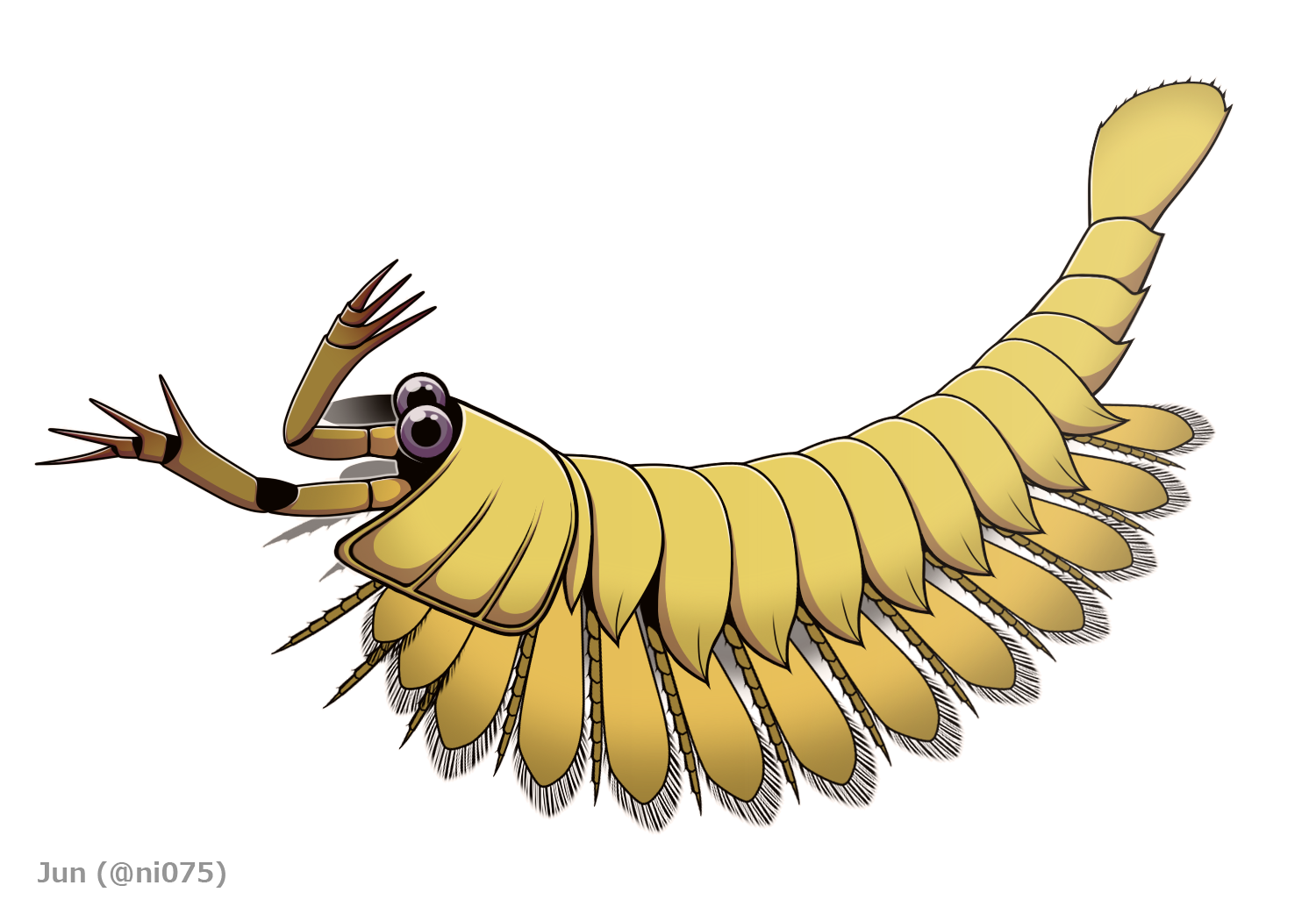
- Life restoration of Y. tenuis

Scientific classification
- Kingdom: Animalia
- Phylum: Arthropoda
- Class: †Megacheira
- Clade: †Cheiromorpha
- Order: †Yohoiida; Simonetta & Delle Cave, 1975
- Family: †Yohoiidae; Henriksen, 1928
- Genus: †Yohoia; Walcott, 1912

Species
- Y. tenuis Walcott, 1912; Y. utahana Conway Morris et al., 2015

= Yohoia =

Yohoia Temporal range: Middle Cambrian

Extinct genus of arthropods

Yohoia is an extinct genus of fossil megacheiran arthropod from the Cambrian period. The type species, Yohoia tenuis, has been found in the Burgess Shale formation of British Columbia. 711 specimens of Yohoia are known from the Greater Phyllopod bed, where they comprise 1.35% of the community. In 2015, Conway Morris et al. reported another species, Y. utahana, from the Marjum Formation, Utah.

== Description ==
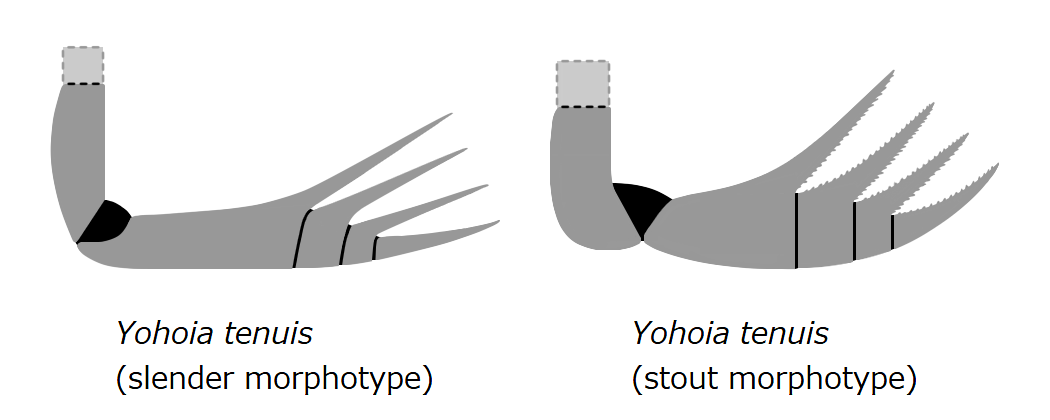
two morphotypes of Yohoia tenuis great appendages

Fossil specimens of Yohoia range in size from 7 to 30 mm, they have a head shield which is followed by 13 flexible trunk segments, each represented by an arch-like tergite (dorsal plate). On both sides, the bottom side of the first 10 of these ended in backward-pointing tergopleurae (lateral extensions), where the tips are pointed in Y. tenuis and blunt in Y. utahana. The last three segments were complete tubes, circling the entire trunk. At the end of the trunk was a paddle-like telson (tail).

The head possess a pair of large eyes and a pair of great appendages at the front. The great appendages had a pronounced "elbow" and 4 distal segments ended in four long spines, looking rather like fingers. In the case of Y. tenuis, the appendages showing a "slender" and a "stout" morphotypes. Serrated fingers similar to Parapeytoia and Fortiforceps are evident in some specimens as well. There were another 13 pairs of subequal appendages on the bottom of the body, 3 pairs below the head shield and 10 pairs below all but the last 3 trunk segments. Each of these appendages compose of a leg-like endopod and a flap-like exopods fringed with setae.

== Ecology ==
The suggested movement of the great appendage of Y. tenuis

Yohoia is assumed to have been a mainly benthic (bottom-dwelling) creature that swam just above the muddy ocean floor, using its great appendages to scavenge or capture prey in a method similar to modern mantis shrimp. The exopods are probably used for swimming and respiration.

== Classification ==
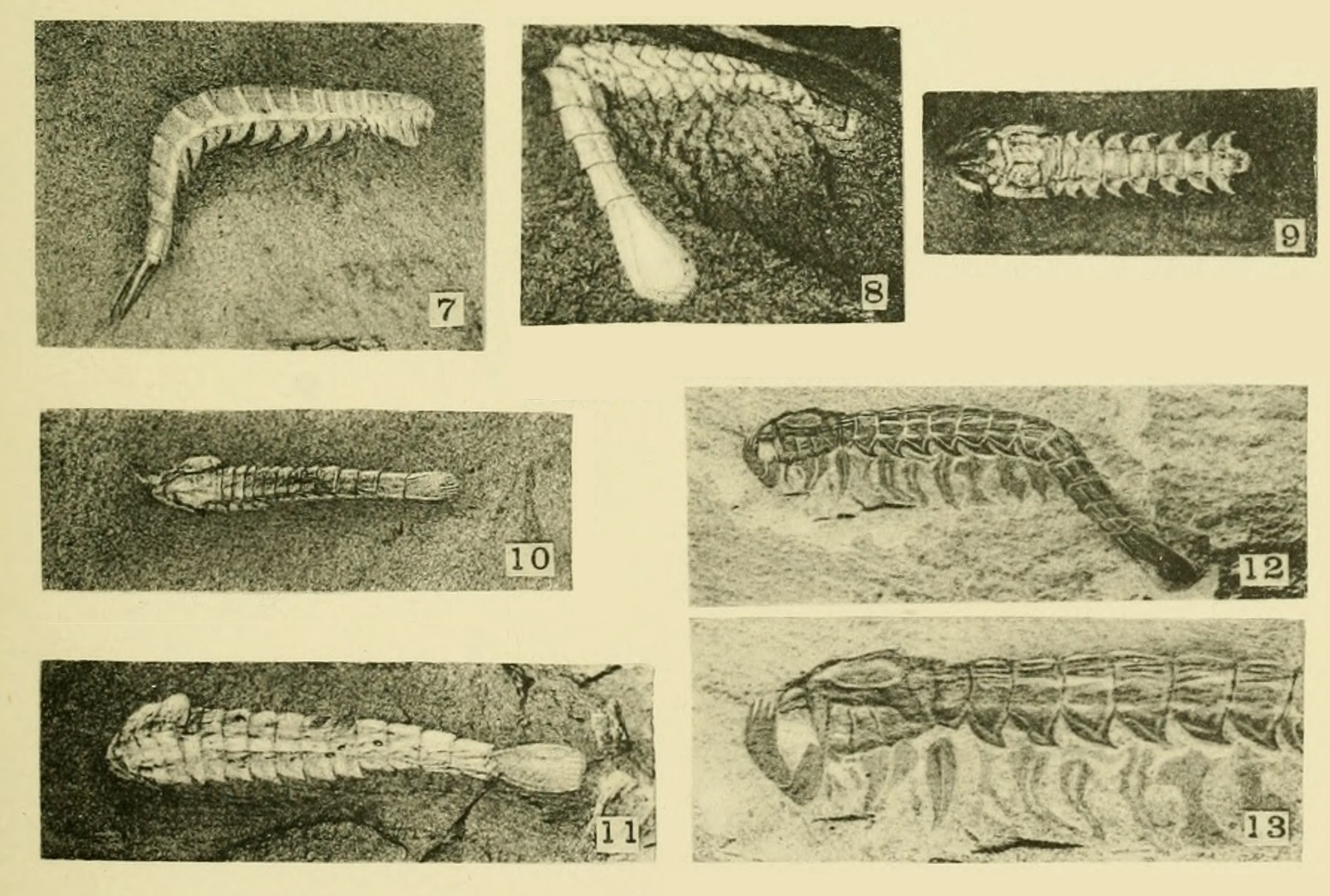
Fossils described by Walcott (1912)

The genus and type species was first described in 1912 by Walcott, who considered it an anostracan crustacean. Upon late 1990s, Yohoia is re-classify under Megacheira (great appendage arthropods), a class of extinct arthropod which has controversial phylogenetic position either as stem chelicerates or a distinct lineage basal than both chelicerates and mandibulates. Within megachierans, Yohoia is generally considered to be part of a clade including Haikoucaris and leanchoiliids, collectively known as Cheiromorpha. Some recent studies suggest alternative positions, for example closer to other megacheirans or Yohoia itself represent a distinct lineage.

== See also ==
- Paleobiota of the Burgess Shale
