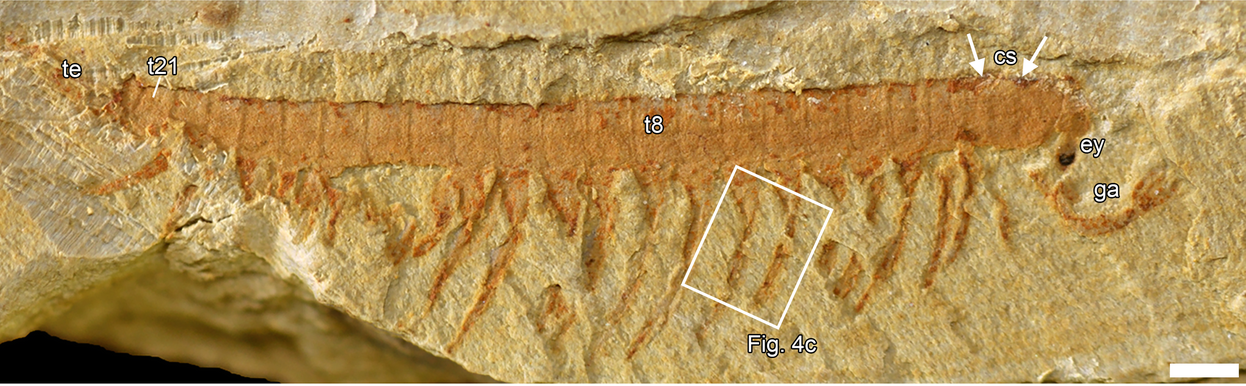
- Specimen NIGPAS 169957 from Mafang (scale bar: 1 mm)
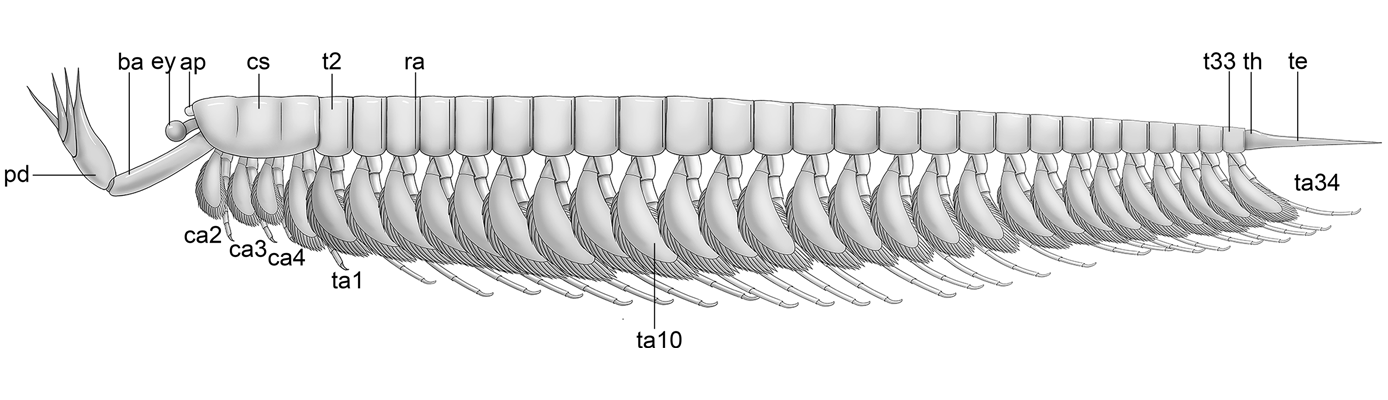
- Diagram in lateral view

Scientific classification
- Kingdom: Animalia
- Phylum: Arthropoda
- Class: †Megacheira
- Family: †Jianfengiidae
- Genus: †Jianfengia; Hou, 1987
- Species: †J. multisegmentalis

Binomial name
- †Jianfengia multisegmentalis Hou, 1987

= Jianfengia =

Jianfengia Temporal range: Cambrian Stage 3 (Atdabanian) ~521–514 Ma

Extinct genus of arthropods

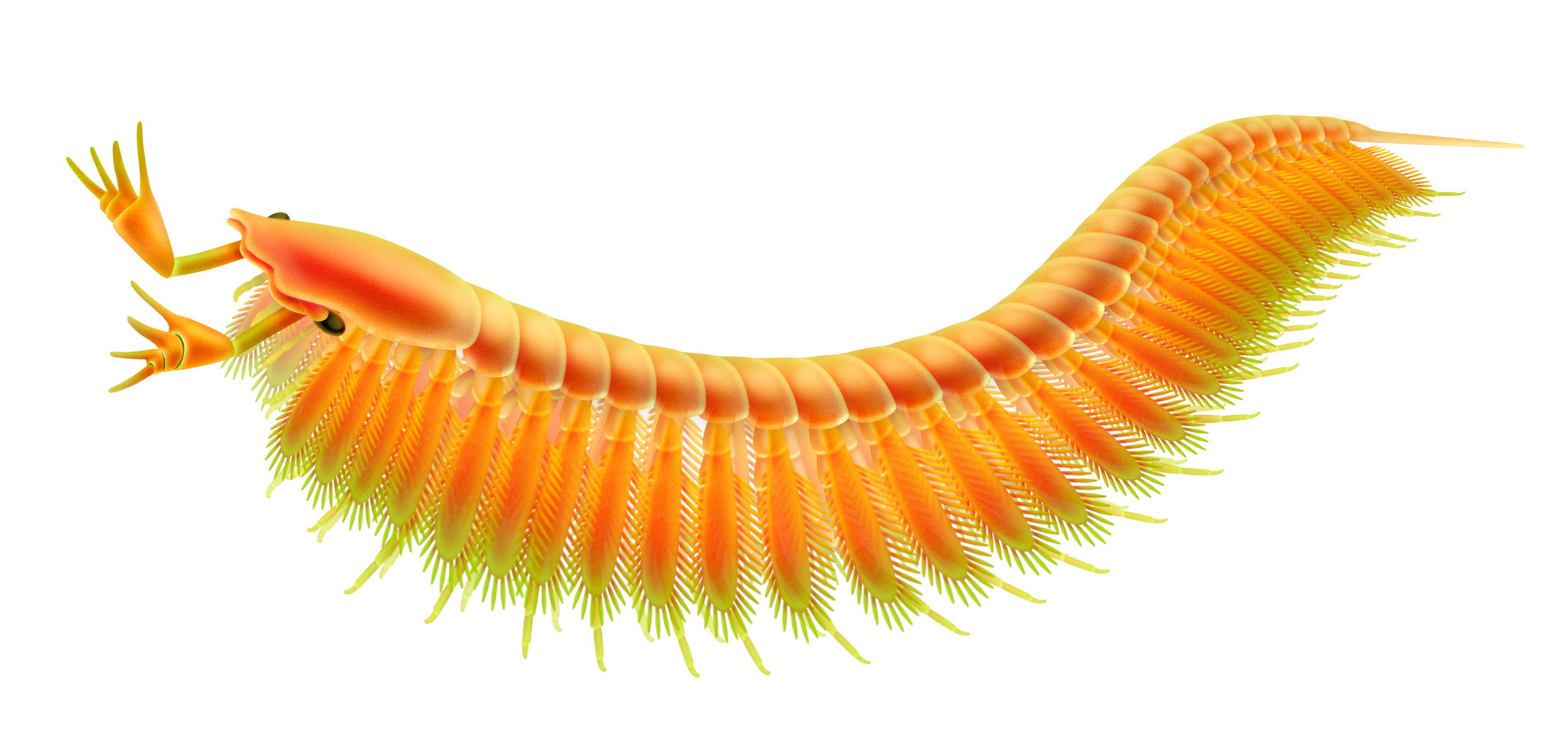
Life restoration

Jianfengia is an extinct genus of Middle Cambrian (Atdabanian) megacheiran arthropod found in the Maotianshan Shale Lagerstätte of China. It contains the single species Jianfengia multisegmentalis. The body is extremely elongated, though the animal itself was relatively small at less than 4 centimetres (1.6 in) in length. The head has a pair of stalked eyes, a hypostome/labrum complex, a pair of great appendages with five podomeres, and four pairs of biramous limbs. The maximum known number of trunk segments is 27, though most known specimens have 20, which are associated with pairs of biramous appendages, and the body ends with a telson spine. It has been placed as a member of the family Jiangfengiidae, alongside Fortiforceps and Sklerolibyon as well as possibly Parapeytoia. Different phylogenetic studies recovered it as a member of the stem group of Euarthropoda, a member of the stem group of Chelicerata or the sister taxon of the total group of Mandibulata, based on a reconstruction of its brain and nervous system.

== See also ==
- List of Chengjiang Biota species by phylum
- Megadictyon
