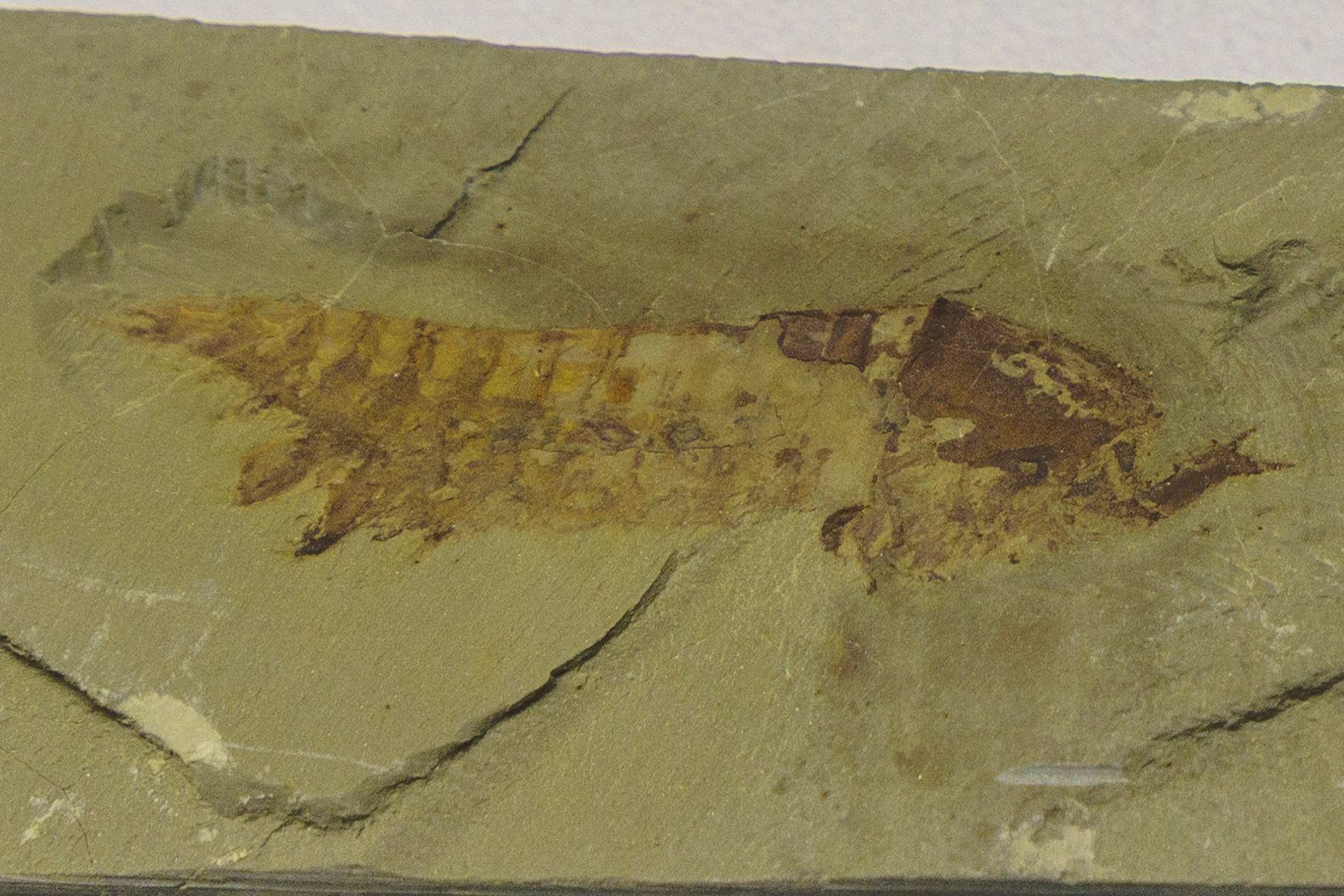
- Fossil of Haikoucaris
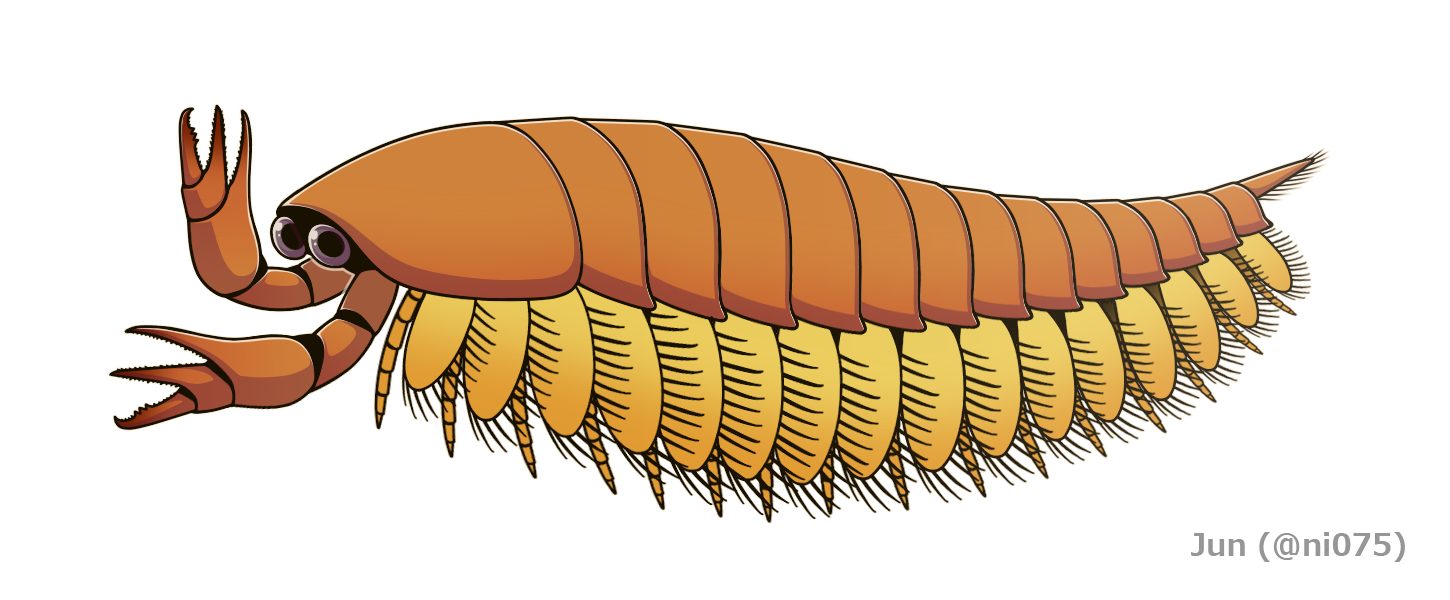
- Reconstruction of Haikoucaris

Scientific classification
- Kingdom: Animalia
- Phylum: Arthropoda
- Class: †Megacheira
- Clade: †Cheiromorpha
- Genus: †Haikoucaris; Chen et al., 2004
- Species: †H. ercaiensis

Binomial name
- †Haikoucaris ercaiensis Chen et al., 2004

= Haikoucaris =

Haikoucaris Temporal range: 518 Ma

Extinct genus of arthropods

Haikoucaris is a genus of megacheiran arthropod that contains the single species Haikoucaris ercaiensis. It was discovered in the Cambrian Chengjiang biota of China.

== Morphology ==
Haikoucaris measured about 38 mm in body length. The elongated body compose of a semicircular head shield, 13 trunk tergites and presumely a short, spine-like telson. The head possess a pair of unstalked eyes, a pair well-developed great appendages, as well as 3 more appendage pairs of unknown detail. Each of the great appendage consists of a 2-segmented peduncle and a 3-segmented claw. Each of the trunk segment possess a pair of biramus appendages that each comprising a leaf-shaped exopod and a possibly 7-segmented endopod.

== Paleoecology ==
Haikoucaris may have been a predator, with its great appendages and exopod suggested to be used for hunting and swimming respectively.

== Taxonomy ==
Within megacheirans, Haikoucaris is generally accepted to be a member of the clade Cheiromorpha alongside Yohoia and Leanchoiliidae.

== See also ==
- Cambrian explosion
- Chengjiang biota
  - List of Chengjiang Biota species by phylum
