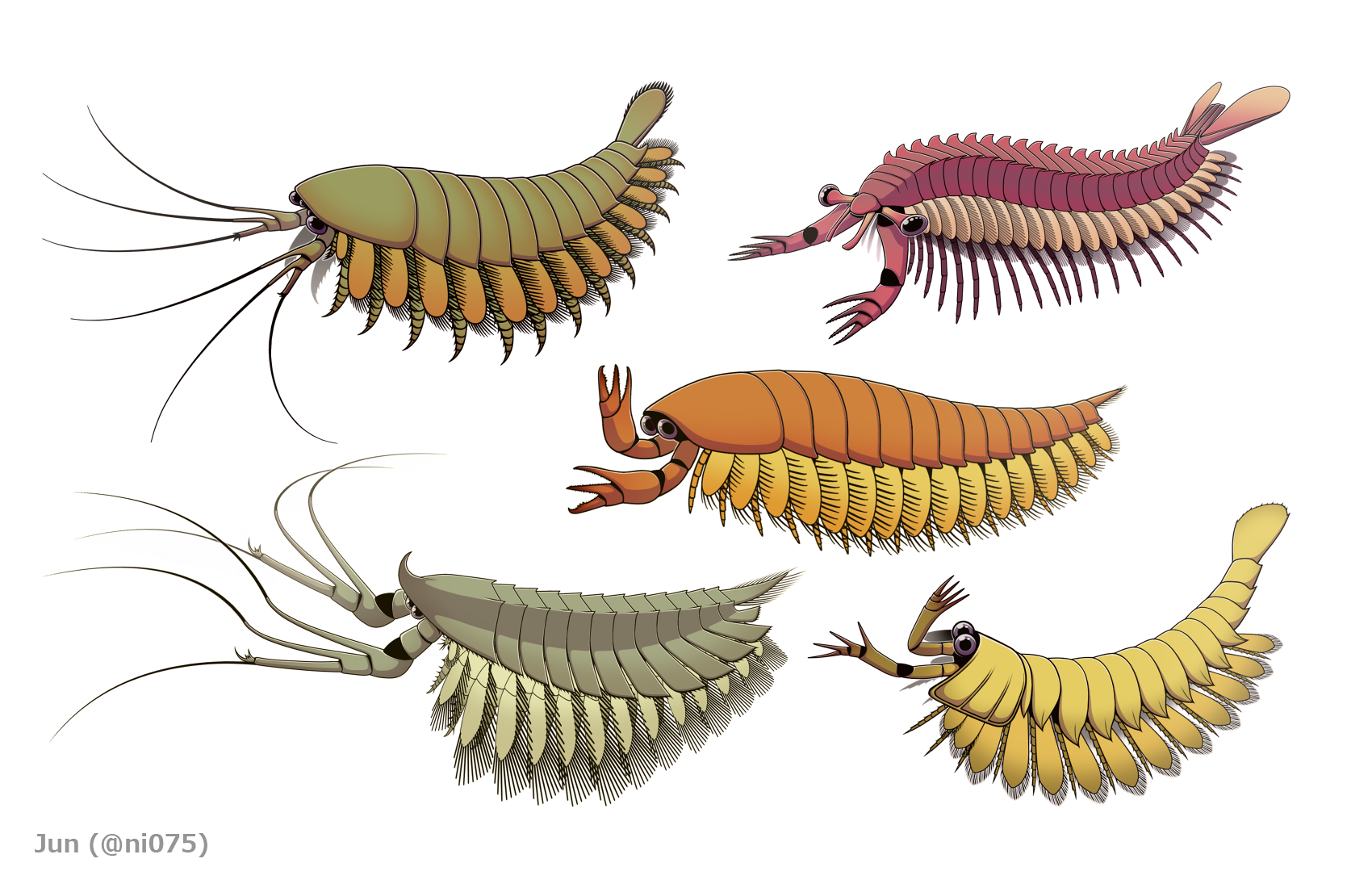
- Alalcomenaeus (top left), Fortiforceps (top right), Haikoucaris (middle), Leanchoilia (bottom left) and Yohoia (bottom right).

Scientific classification
- Kingdom: Animalia
- Phylum: Arthropoda
- Clade: Deuteropoda
- Class: †Megacheira; Hou and Bergström, 1997

Groups
- See text

= Megacheira =

Megacheira Temporal range: Middle Cambrian-Late Ordovician Cambrian Stage 3–Katian Possible --Silurian and Devonian records

Extinct class of arthropods

Megacheira (from Ancient Greek μέγας (mégas), meaning "great", and χείρ (kheír), meaning "hand", also historically great appendage arthropods) is an extinct class of early Paleozoic predatory arthropods defined by their possession of spined "great appendages". Their taxonomic position is controversial, with studies generally either considering them stem-group euarthropods, or stem-group chelicerates. The homology of the great appendages to the cephalic appendages of other arthropods is also controversial. Uncontested members of the group were present in marine environments worldwide from the lower Cambrian to the upper Ordovician.

== Morphology ==
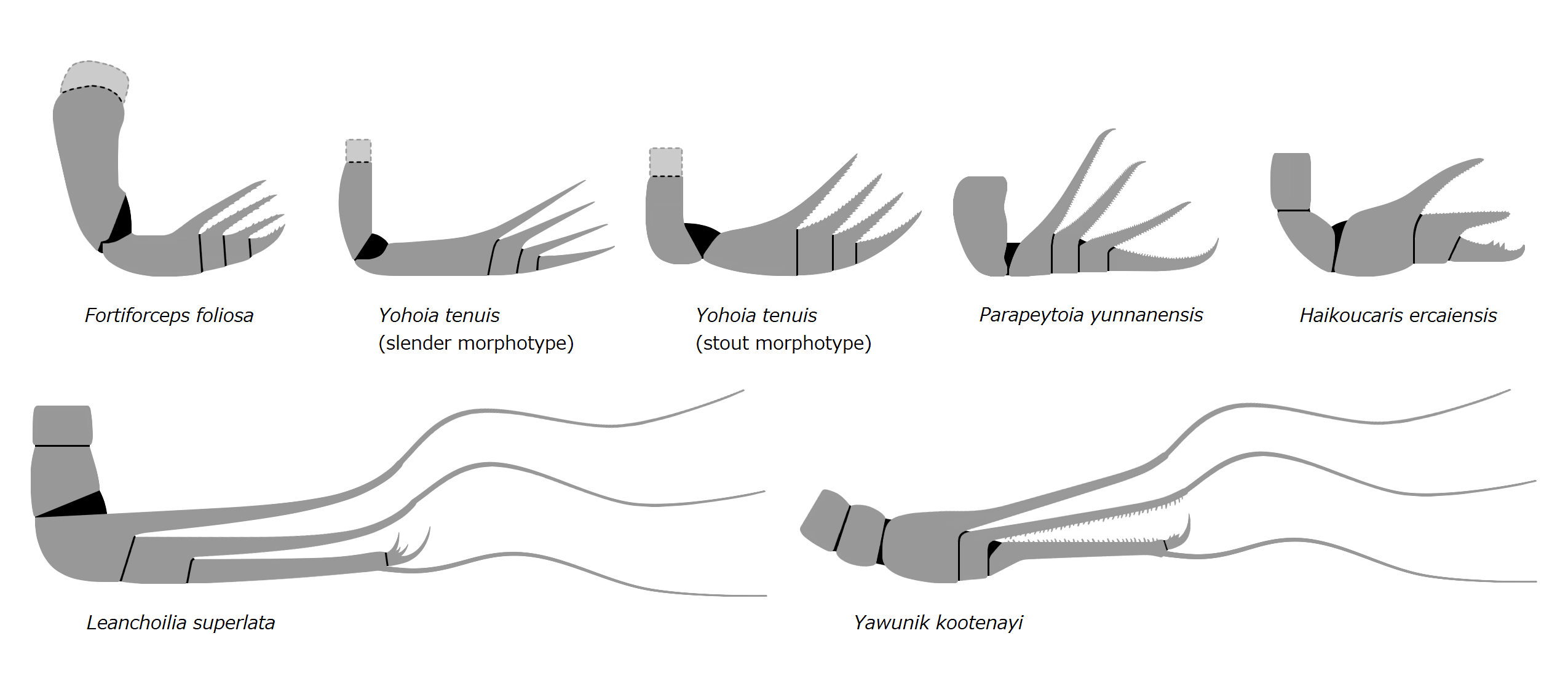
Comparison of megacheiran great appendages

Movement range of the great appendage of Yohoia

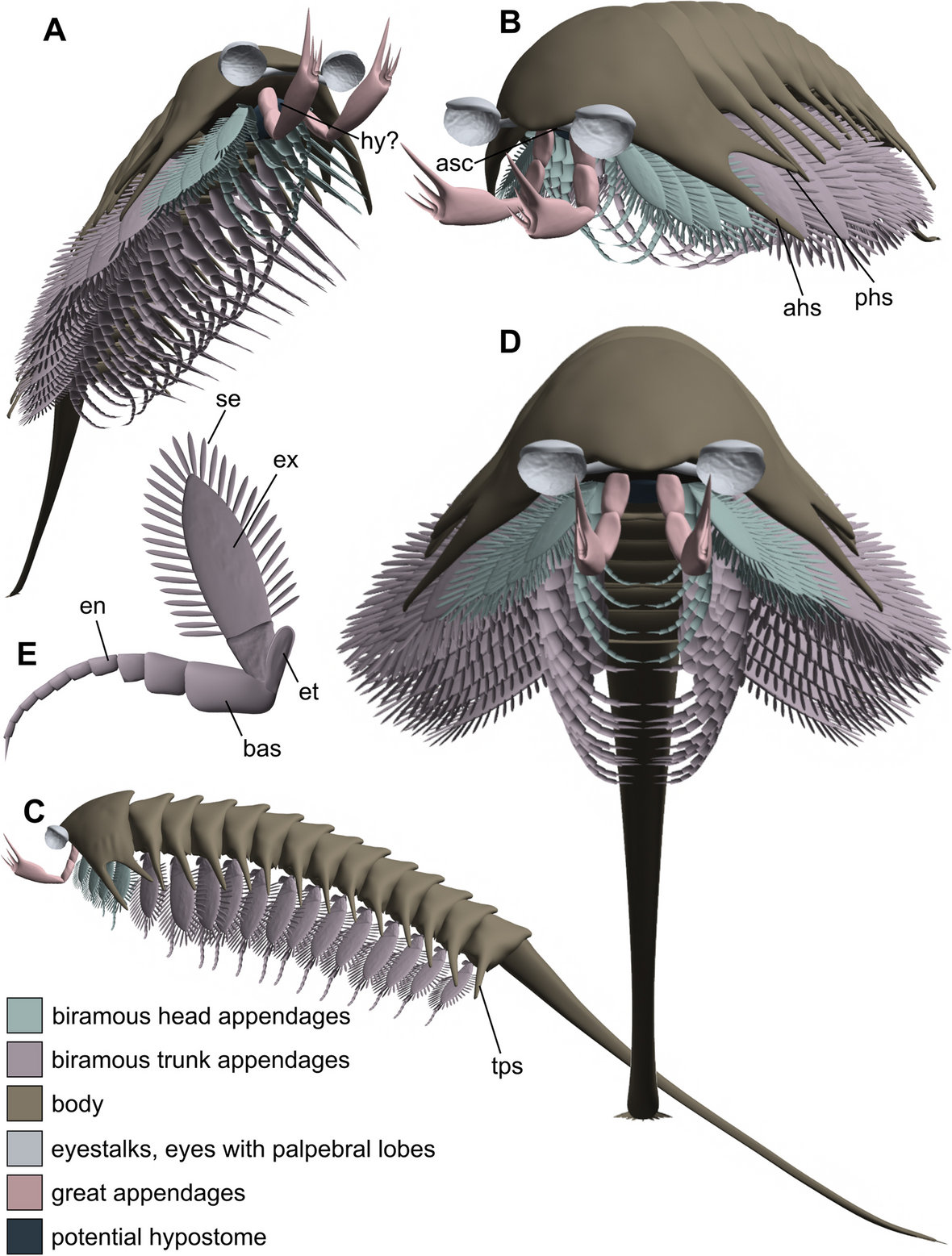
3D model of Tanglangia longicaudata. en=endopod, ex=exopod

Megacheirans are defined by their possession of uniramous (unbranched) "great appendages", which are their first pair of head appendages. The first one or two proximalmost segments/podomeres closest towards the body are spineless (it has been argued that the supposed first of the two proximal podomeres is actually an arthrodial membrane), while the remaining 3–4 more distal podomeres towards the ends of the limbs each typically bear a single upward pointing spine attached towards the distal (towards the tip) end of the segment, with the spineless proximal segment/s typically being connected to the spined distal segments by an elbow-like joint, which curled upwards. The great appendages have been interpreted as raptorial limbs involved in predation, with those of some genera such as Yohoia being structurally comparable to the raptorial maxillipeds of mantis shrimp. The spines on the great appendages of leanchoilid megacheirans such as Leanchoilia and Yawunik are elongated and whip-like, suggesting an antennae-like sensory role alongside predatory function. The body is divided into the head and the trunk, with the upper surface of the body being covered in overlapping tergites (upper body plates). On the head behind the great appendages and on the trunk were attached pairs of biramous (divided into two branches) limbs running along the body. The biramous limbs of megacheirans are homonomous (i.e. having little differentiation from each other), with endopods (the lower, leg-like branches) typically divided into seven segments/podomeres, and paddle-shaped exopods (the upper limb branches), which are fringed with thin lamellae. The morphology of the terminal telson segment is variable. The biramous limbs of at least some megacheirans have been suggested bear exites.

== Taxonomy ==
Several subdivisions within the group are recognised including Jianfengiidae (including Fortiforceps, Jianfengia, Sklerolibyon and possibly Parapeytoia) which are known from the Early Cambrian of China, as well as the Cheiromorpha (containing at least Yohoia, Haikoucaris, and Leanchoiliidae), known with certainty from the Early-Mid Cambrian of North America, China and Australia, which is distinguished from Jianfengiidae by having a fewer number of body segments (20+ in Jianfengiidae, as compared to typically only 11 to 13 in Cheiromorpha). The monophyly of Megacheira is uncertain, with some studies recovering the group as paraphyletic. The latest unambiguous megacheiran is the leanchoiliid Lomankus from the Upper Ordovician of North America.

Parapeytoia from the Cambrian of China which was formerly misinterpreted as a radiodont was later suggested to be a member of this group. Possible megacheirans include Enalikter described from the Silurian of the United Kingdom, and Bundenbachiellus from the Early Devonian of Germany; due to their possession of great appendage-like cephalic appendages. However, their relationship to megacheirans has been questioned, due to the uncertain homology of their appendages. Kootenichela has been suggested to be a chimera of various arthropod taxa. Previous inclusion of some "bivalved" genera such as Forfexicaris, Ovalicephalus, and Occacaris to Megacheira was questioned by later investigations. The Late Cambrian Orsten taxon Oelandocaris typically considered to be a crustacean relative, has also been suggested in some studies to be a megacheiran.

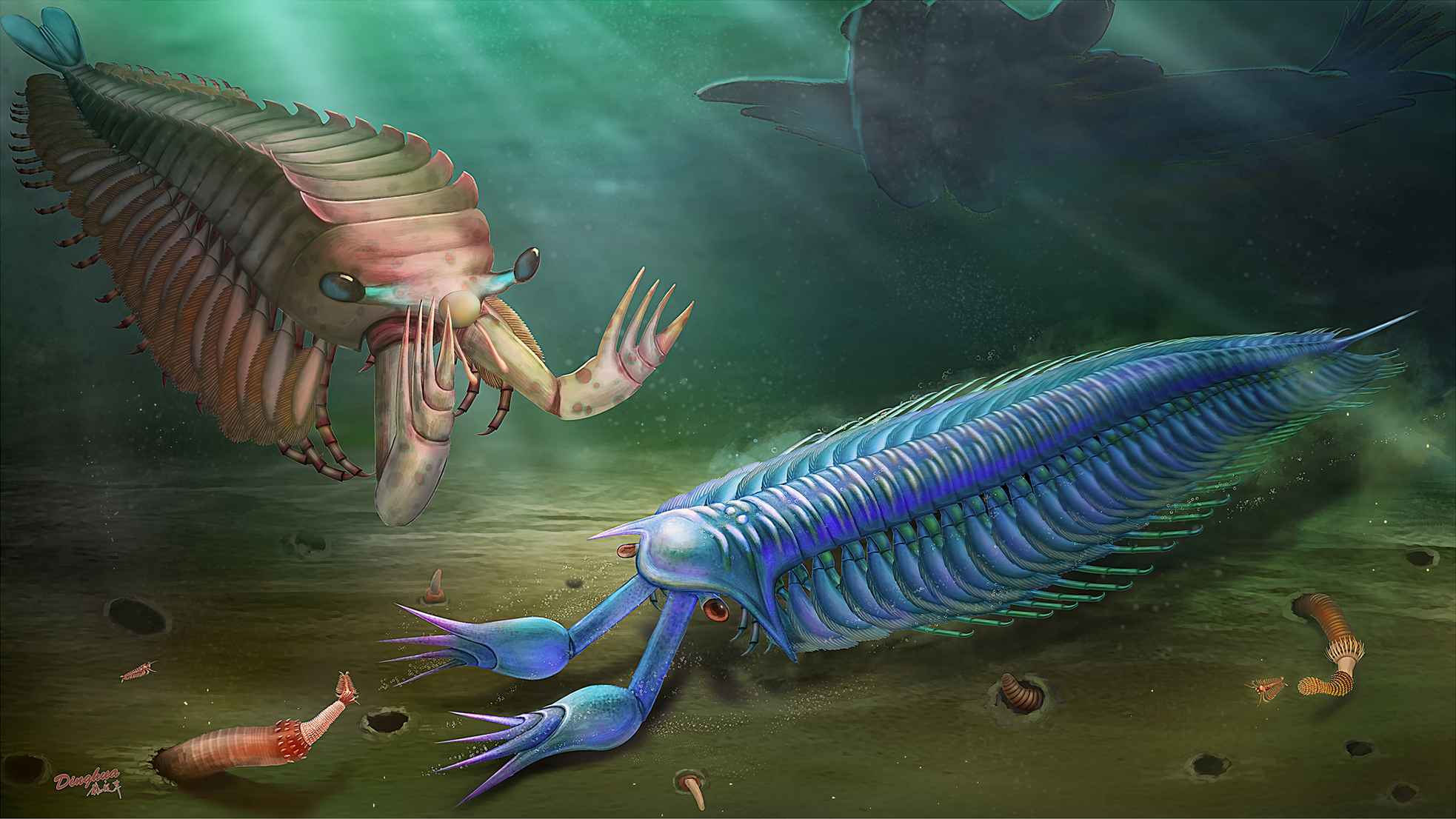
Life reconstruction of Fortiforceps (left) and Sklerolibyon (right)

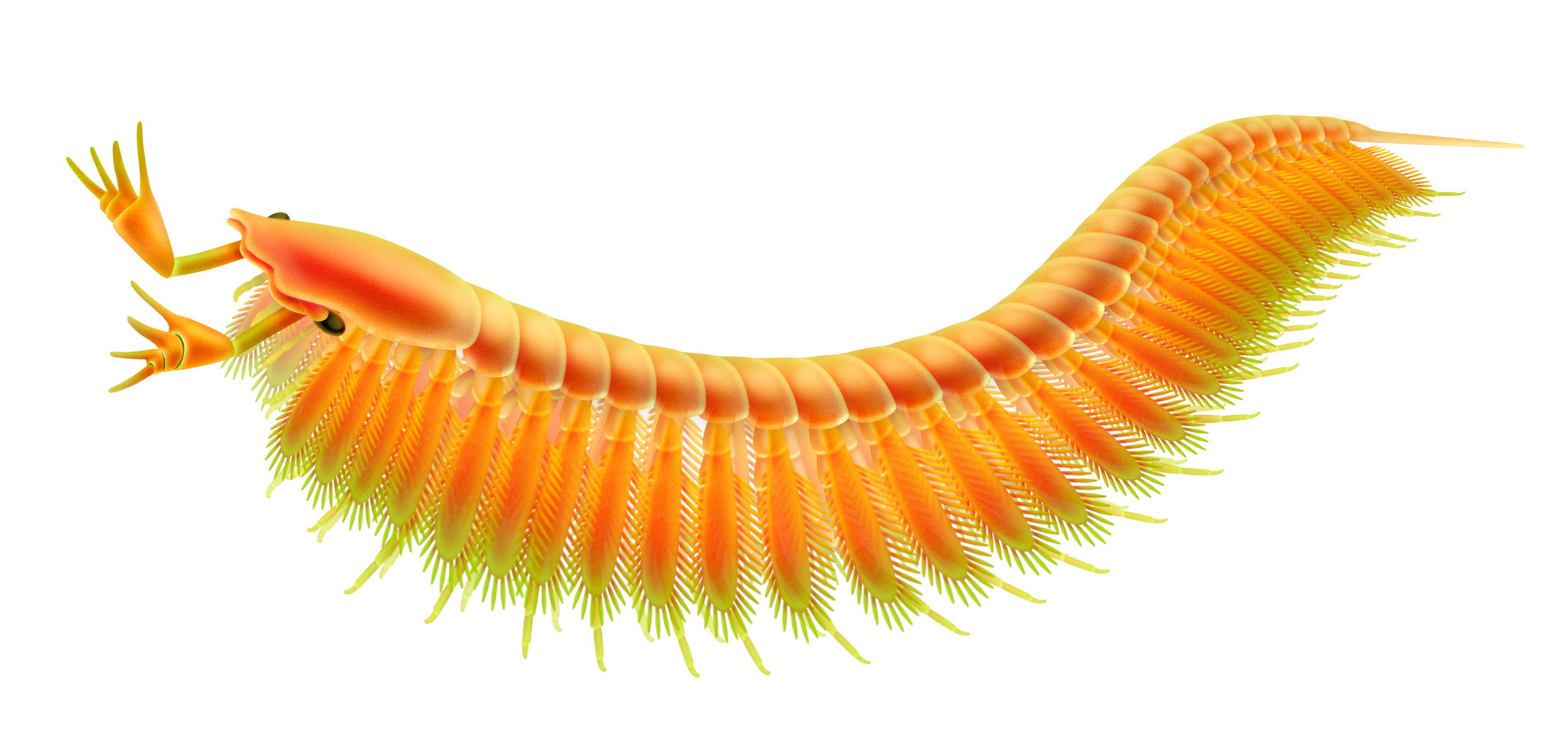
Life restoration of Jianfengia

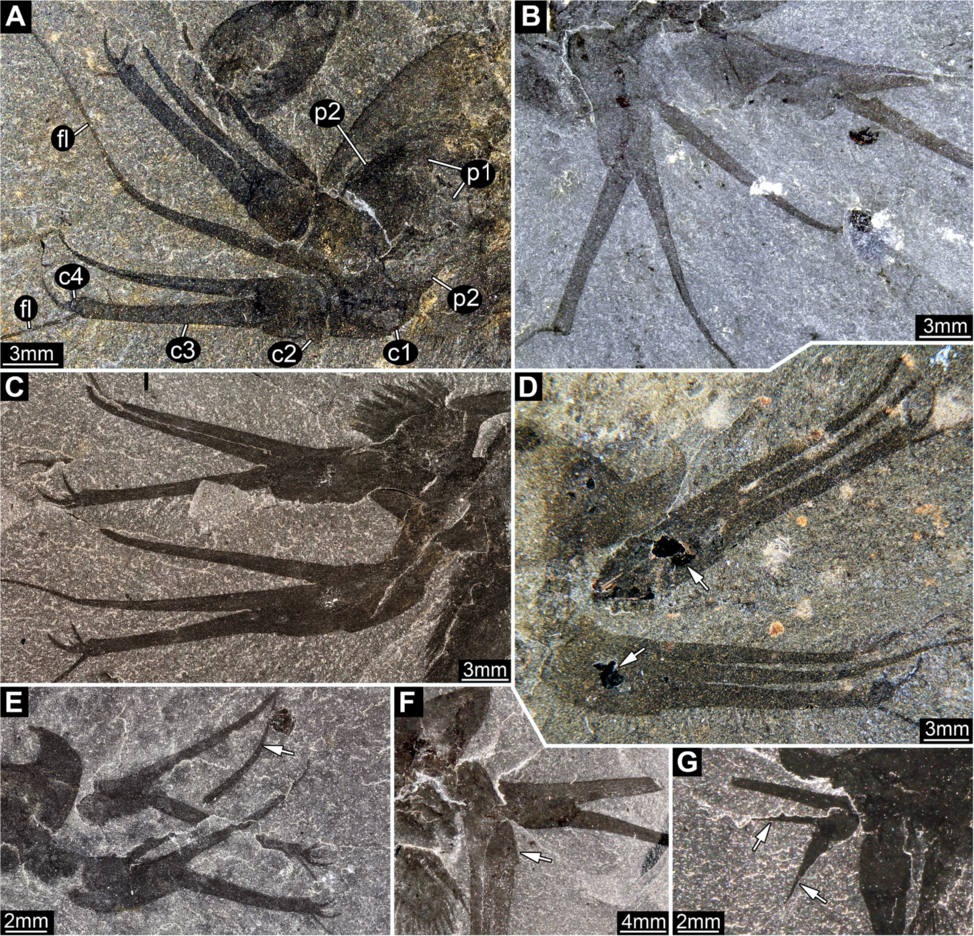
Closeup of great appendages of Leanchoilia superlata

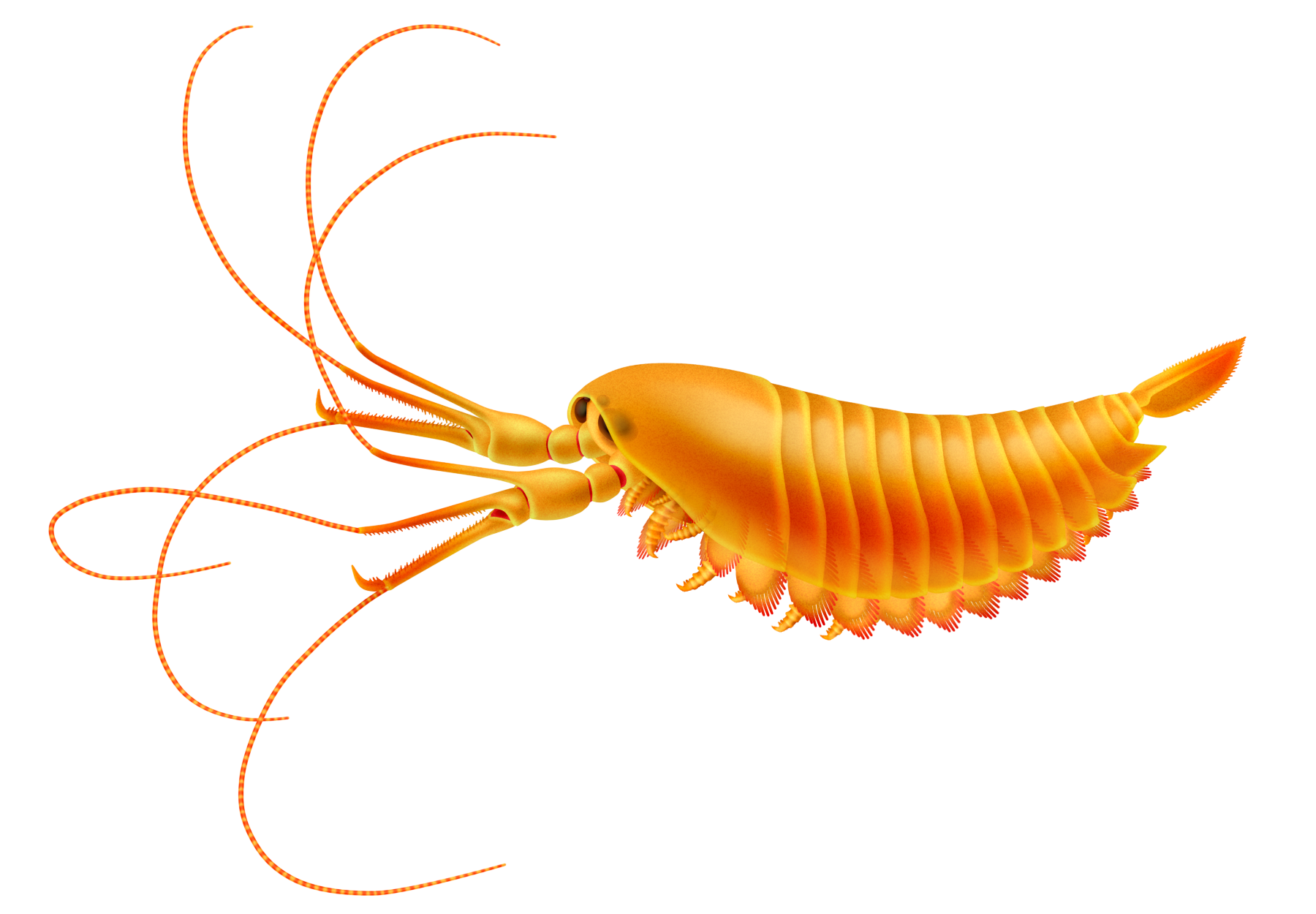
Life restoration of Yawunik

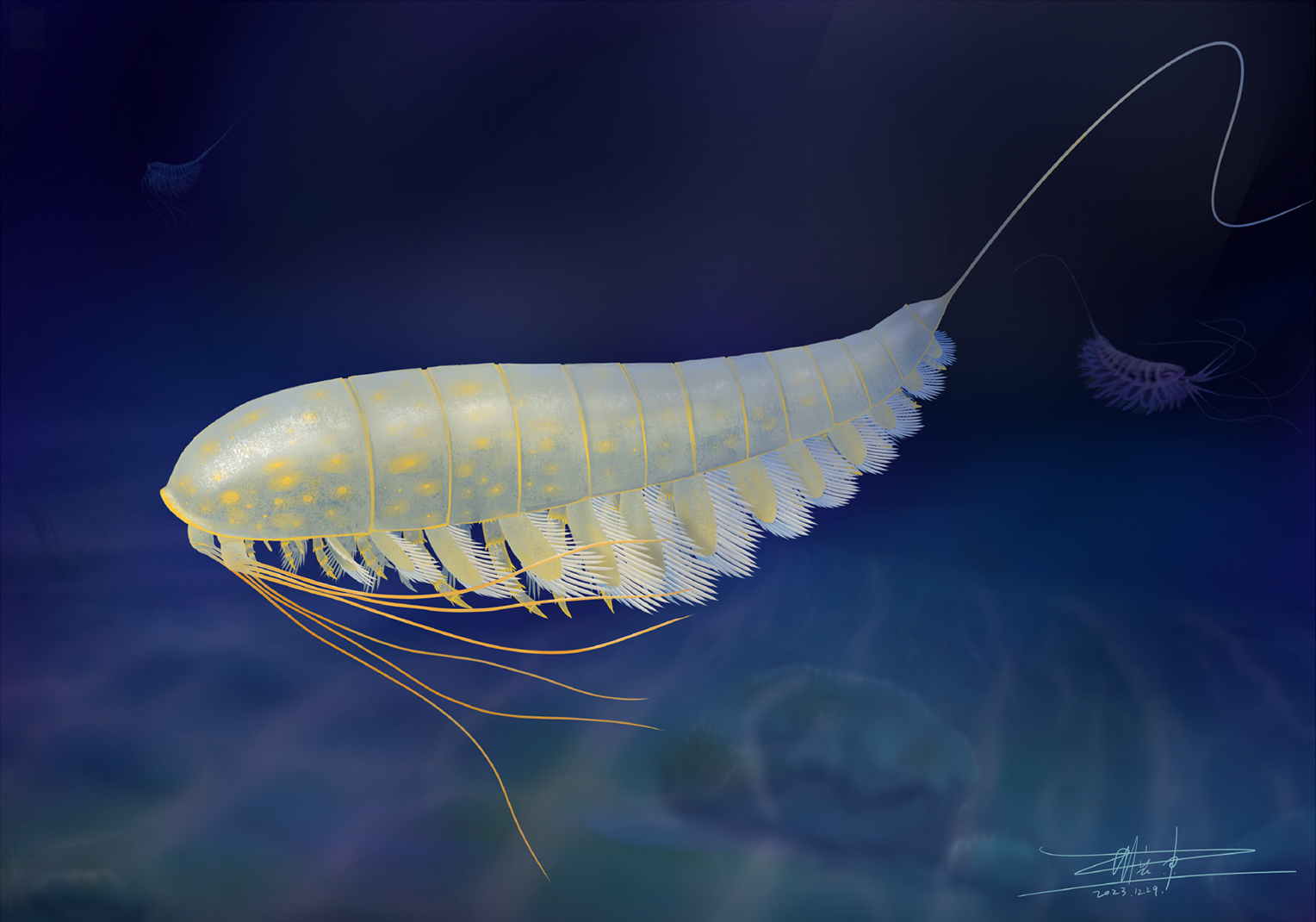
Life restoration of Lomankus

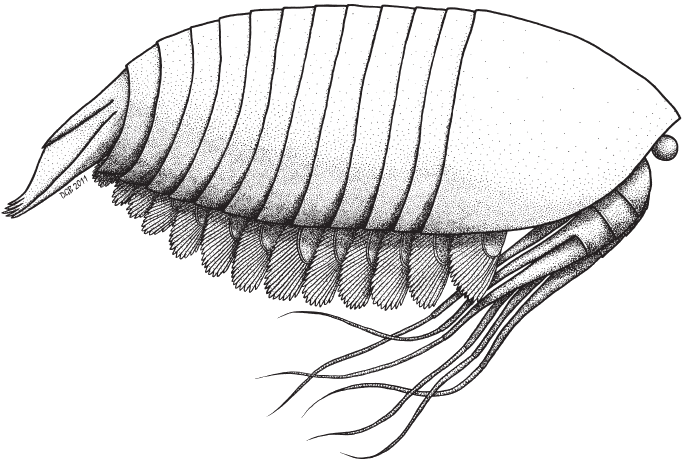
Life restoration of Oestokerkus

=== List of genera ===
- †Tanglangia
- †Oelandocaris?
- †Jianfengiidae
  - Sklerolibyon
  - Jianfengia
  - Parapeytoia?
  - Fortiforceps
- †Kootenichelidae?
  - Kootenichela?
  - Worthenella?
  - Pseudoiulia?
- †Cheiromorpha
  - Yohoia
  - Haikoucaris
  - Leanchoiliida
    - Enaliktidae?
      - Enalikter?
      - Bundenbachiellus?
    - Leanchoiliidae
      - Actaeus
      - Alalcomenaeus
      - Leanchoilia
      - Oestokerkus
      - Yawunik
      - Kanoshoia
      - Lomankus

=== Relationship to other arthropods ===
Megacheirans are either suggested to be stem-group chelicerates (the group containing arachnids, sea spiders and horseshoe crabs, among other extinct groups) or stem-group arthropods outside the split between Chelicerata and the other major group of living arthropods, Mandibulata (which includes crustaceans, insects, centipedes and millipedes, among others). The former hypothesis is based on the chelicerae-like morphology of the great appendages, alongside neuroanatomy and the presence of a reduced labrum resembling those of modern chelicerates. The proponents of this hypothesis argue that chelicerae and the great appendages are homologous structures. Other studies suggest that the megacheirans are stem-group arthropods based on the argument that the great appendages are homologous to the frontal appendages of stem-group arthropods like Isoxys and radiodonts. This identity is disputed, with other authors suggesting that the frontal appendages of radiodonts are homologous to the labrum of modern arthropods. Some studies have suggested based on brain and nervous system anatomy that while some megacheirans are stem-chelicerates, others are stem-mandibulates.

Cladogram of Arthropoda after Aria et al. 2020, showing megacheirans (as indicated by the orange bar) as a paraphyletic stem group to modern arthropods:

- Arthropoda (s. l.)
  - †Opabinia
  - - †Anomalocaris
    - - †Hurdiidae
      - Deuteropoda
        - †Isoxyidae
        - - †Jianfengiidae
            - †Jianfengia
            - - †Sklerolibyon
              - - †Fortiforceps
                - †Parapeytoia
          - - †Yohoia
            - - - †Haikoucaris
                - †Leanchoiliidae
              - - Chelicerata
                  - Pycnogonida (sea spiders)
                  - - †Habeliida
                    - Euchelicerata
                - Antennulata
                  - - †Kiisortoqia
                    - †Artiopoda (including Trilobita)
                  - - †Marrella
                    - - †Aquilonifer
                      - Mandibulata

Placement of monophyletic Megacheira at the base of Chelicerata, after Parry et al. 2024:^{supplemental material}

- Arthropoda (s. l.)
  - †Opabinia
  - - †Radiodonta (e.g. Anomalocaris)
    - Deuteropoda
      - †Fengzhengia
      - †Kylinxia
      - - Total group Mandibulata
          - - †Kiisortoqia
            - †Bushizheia
          - - †Isoxyidae
            - - †Artiopoda (including Trilobita)
              - - †Fuxianhuiida
                - - †Hymenocarina
                  - Mandibulata (crown group)
        - Pan‑Chelicerata
          - - †Habelia
            - - †Mollisonia
              - - Xiphosura (horseshoe crabs)
                - - †Dibasterium
                  - †Offacolus
          - Megacheira
            - - †Haikoucaris
              - Leanchoiliidae
                - †Oestokerkus
                - - †Yawunik
                  - †Alalcomenaeus
                - - †Lomankus
                  - †Leanchoilia
            - - - †Tanglangia
                - †Yohoia
              - Jianfengiidae
                - †Fortiforceps
                - - †Sklerolibyon
                  - †Jianfengia

Placement of megacheirans (represented by orange bar) as a paraphyletic assemblage at the base of total-group Chelicerata, after Lerosey-Aubril and Ortega-Hernández (2026):

- - Pan‑Chelicerata
    - - †Jianfengia
      - †Sklerolibyon
    - - †Fortiforceps
      - †Yohoia
      - - †Haikoucaris
        - †Leanchoiliidae
      - - †Mollisoniida
        - - †Wisangocaris
          - †Habelia
          - - †Sanctacaris
            - †Utahcaris
          - chelicerae present
            - †Megachelicerax
            - - †Offacolus
              - - - †Setapedites
                  - †Dibasterium
                - - †Weinbergina
                  - - †Venustulus
                    - - Pycnogonida (sea spiders)
                      - - Xiphosura (horseshoe crabs)
                        - - Arachnida
                          - †Eurypterida (sea scorpions)
