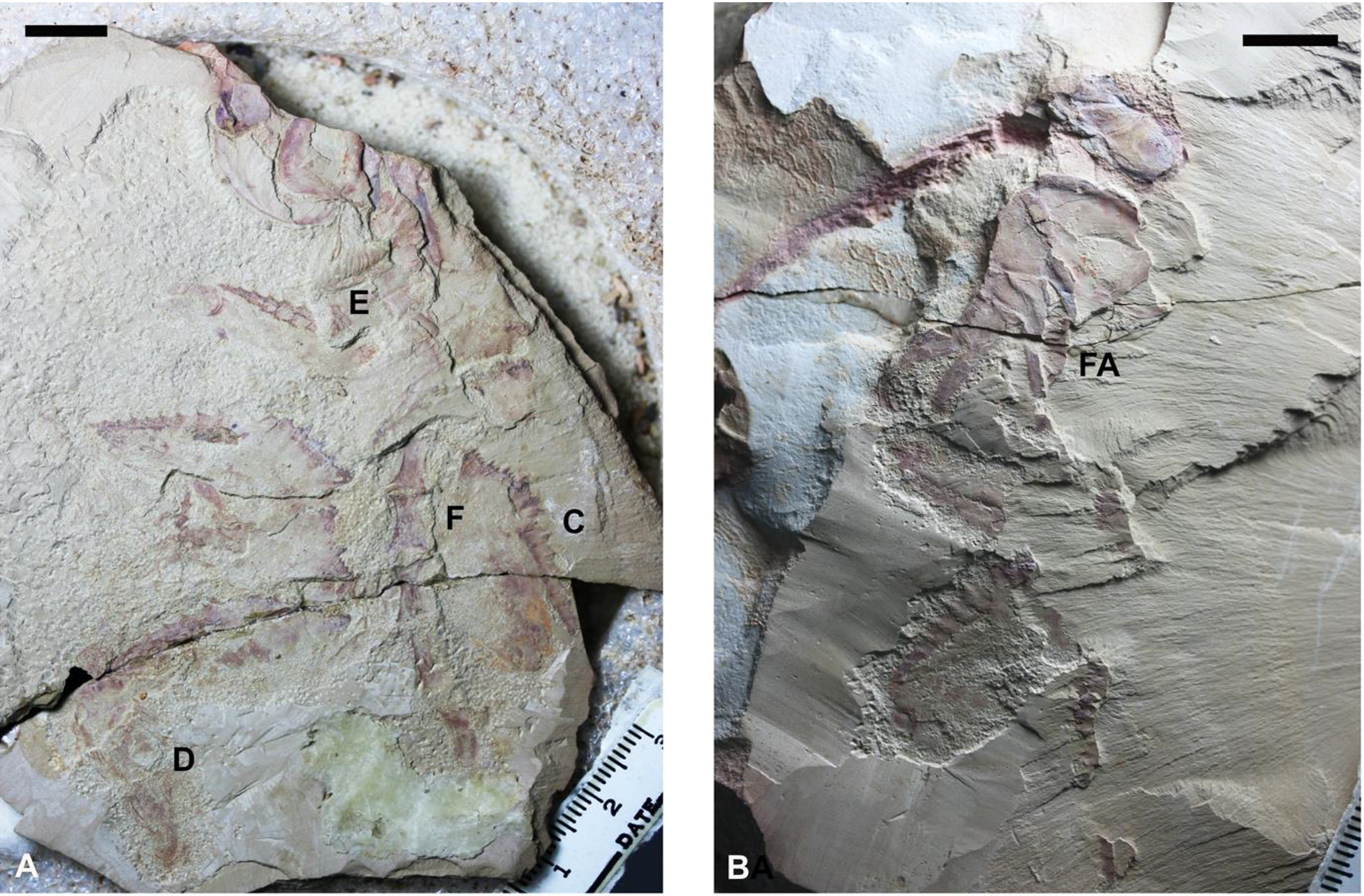
- Holotype of Parapeytoia yunnanensis, part and counterpart
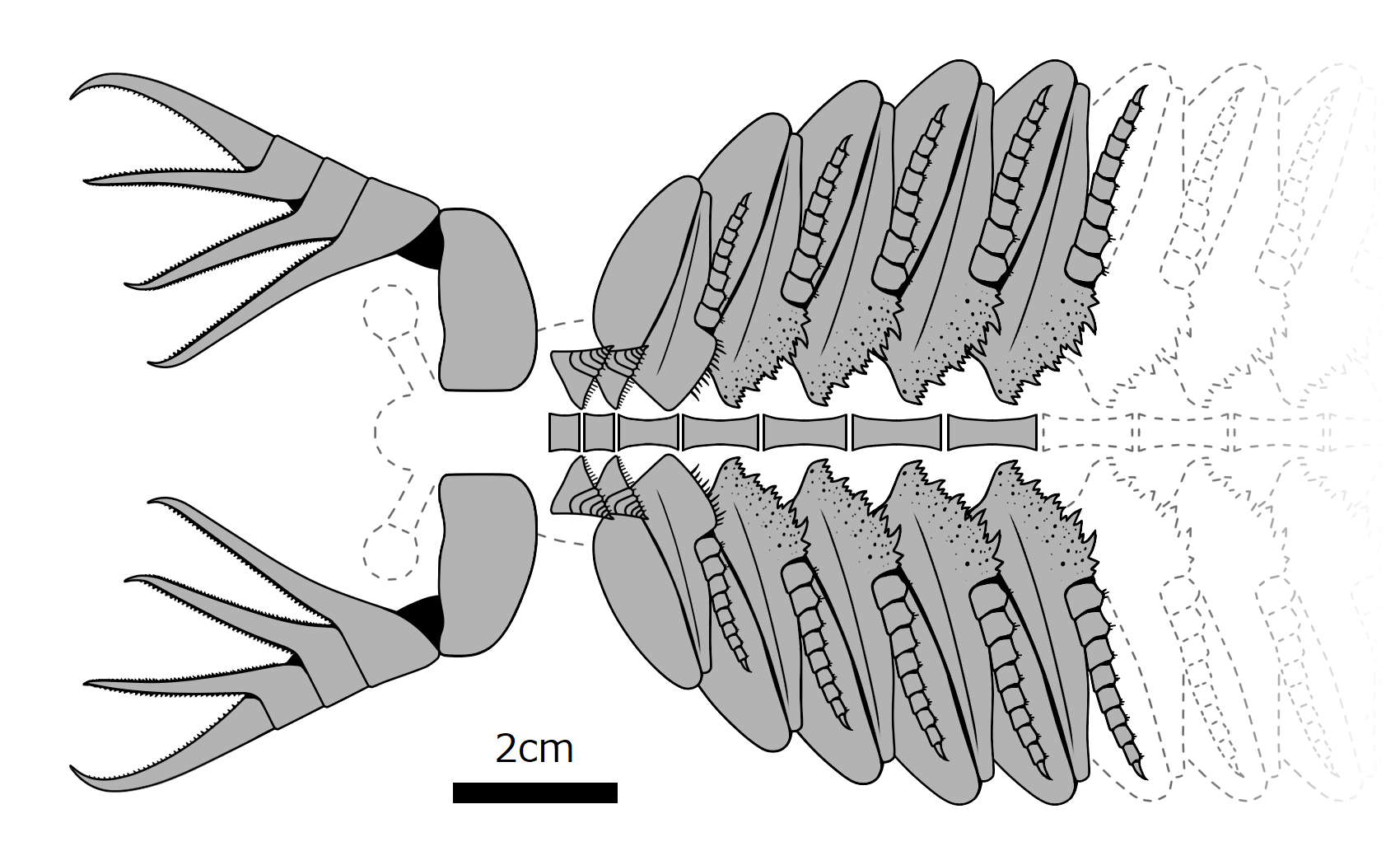
- Ventral structures of the same species

Scientific classification
- Kingdom: Animalia
- Phylum: Arthropoda
- Class: †Megacheira
- Family: †Jianfengiidae
- Genus: †Parapeytoia; Hou, Bergström & Ahlberg, 1995

Type species
- Parapeytoia yunnanensis Hou, Bergstrom & Ahlberg, 1995

= Parapeytoia =

Parapeytoia Temporal range: Cambrian Stage 3–Cambrian Stage 4

Extinct genus of arthropods

Parapeytoia is a genus of Cambrian arthropod. The type and only described species is Parapeytoia yunnanensis, which lived over 518 million years ago (Cambrian Stage 3) in the Maotianshan shales of Yunnan, China. Unidentified fossils from the same genus have also been discovered from the nearby Wulongqing Formation (Cambrian Stage 4).

== Classification ==
Initially, Parapeytoia was interpreted as a radiodont ("anomalocaridid" at that time) dinocaridid with legs alongside Cucumericrus, purported to be an indicator that radiodonts might have legs underneath their body flaps in general, comparable to Pambdelurion. With the combination of megacheiran and presumably radiodont features (see text), it was also suggested to be an intermediate form between the two taxa. However, later studies revealed it was most likely nested within megacheira, and the group as a whole was no longer thought to have originated from radiodonts. Within megacheira, Parapeytoia was possibly closest to the multisegmented (with over 20 trunk segments) taxa like Fortiforceps and Jianfengia, united under the family Jianfengiidae.

== Description ==
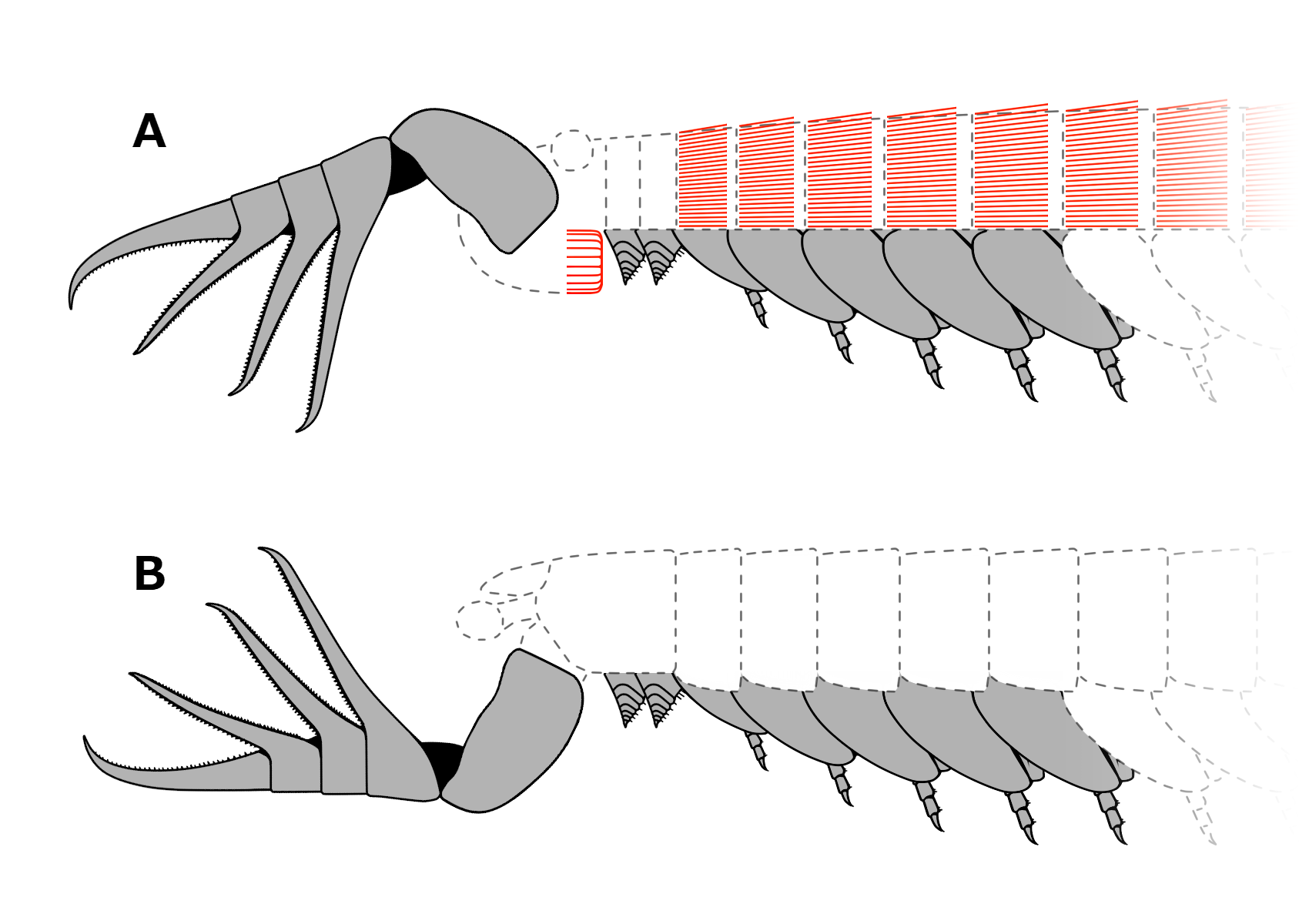
Interpretations on Parapeytoia yunnanensis as a radiodont (A) and jianfengiid megacheiran (B) respectively. Red parts indicating suggested radiodont-like features with questionable affinity. Dark grey indicating other structures unambiguously belong to this species.

Parapeytoia is known from a few incomplete fossil materials with part of its ventral structures preserved. The frontmost appendages were a pair of great appendages consisting of a robust peduncle and 4 distal segments with a serrated spine on each of them, a feature shared by some other megacheirans such as Yohoia and Fortiforceps. Behind the great appendages were 2 or 3 pairs of short appendages, and numerous pairs of well-developed biramous appendages, each formed by a basipod with a spiny gnathobase, lobe-like exopod and leg-like endopod with 8 segments. A narrow, hourglass-like sternite was associated between each of those appendages.

Some features originally interpreted as radiodont-like are now considered questionable. Radial sclerites interpreted as Parapeytoia mouthparts (oral cone) have since been assigned to another genus of animal, Omnidens. While some subsequent studies suggest those features are genuine, they most likely represent ancestral traits originating from more basal arthropods instead of any indicators of radiodont affinities. This is the case for the gnathobases, and the presence of arthropodized endopods underneath the purported body flaps (exopods), which conflict with the radiodont trunk appendages as well (the radiodont ventral body flaps are most likely homologous to euarthropod endopods).

== Paleobiology ==
Parapeytoia was probably a benthic feeder, spending most of its time on the ocean floor hunting (or possibly scavenging) for prey.
