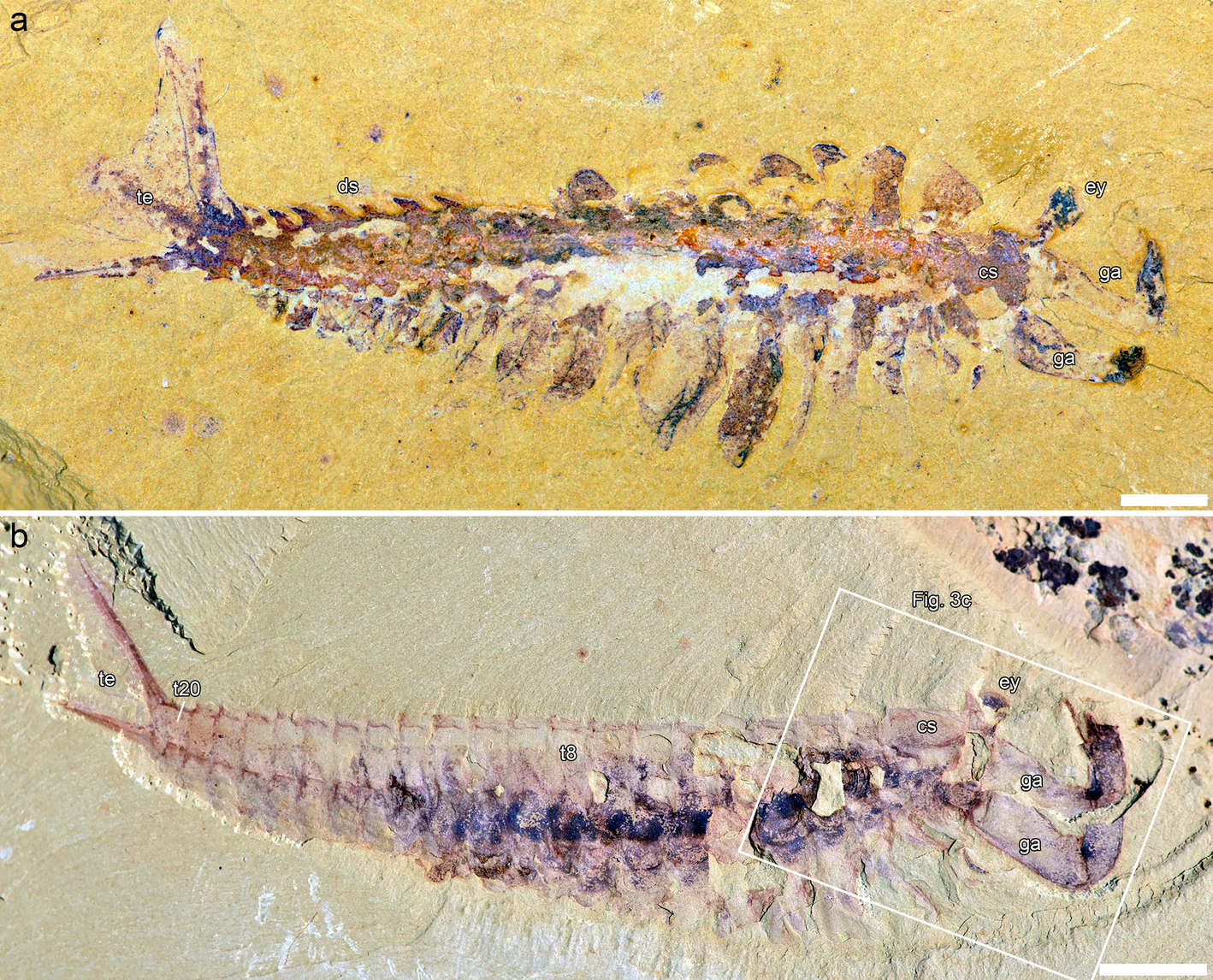
- Fossils
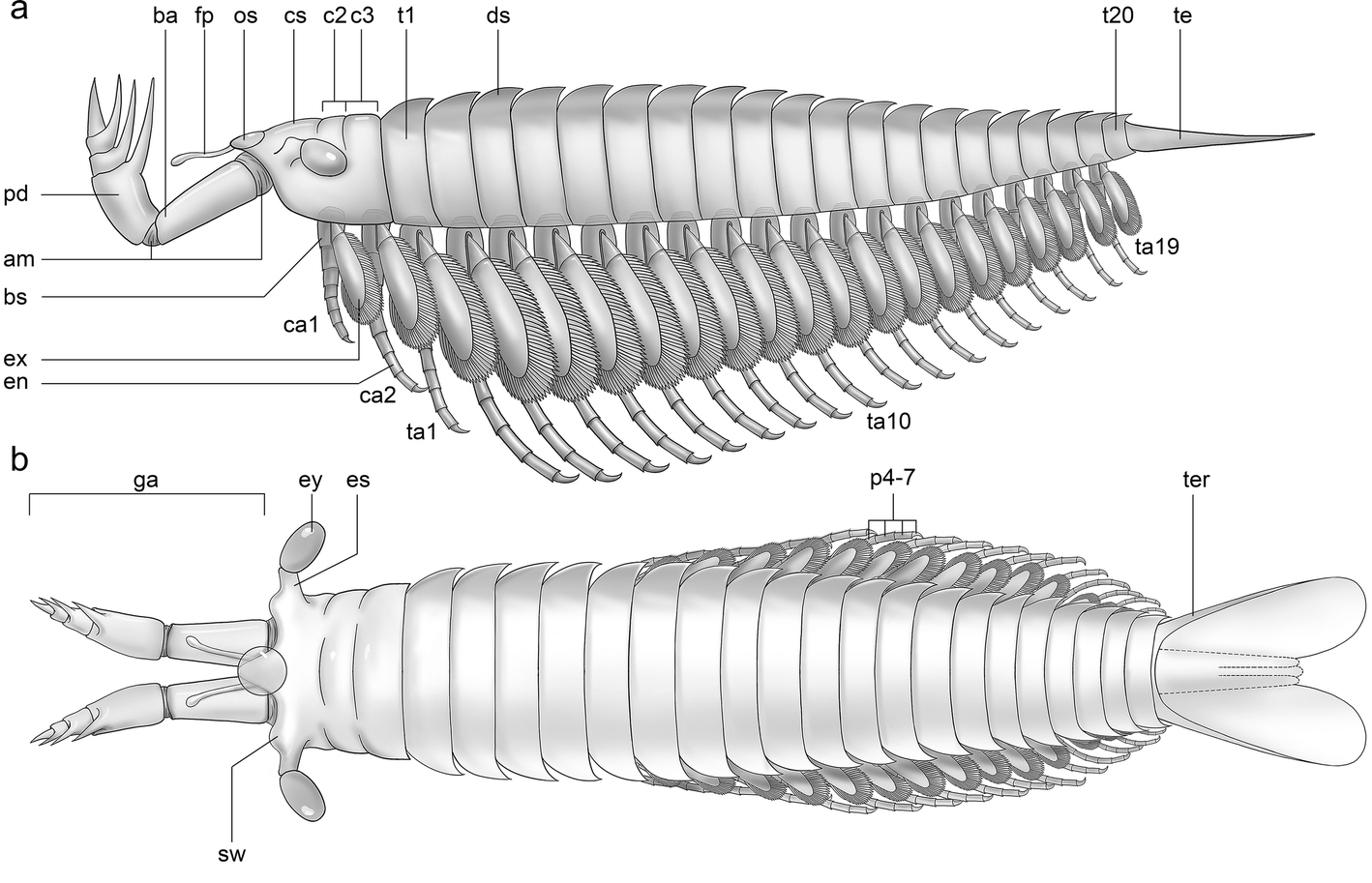
- Diagrammatic reconstruction

Scientific classification
- Kingdom: Animalia
- Phylum: Arthropoda
- Class: †Megacheira
- Family: †Jianfengiidae
- Genus: †Fortiforceps; Hou and Bergström 1997

Type species
- Fortiforceps foliosa Hou and Bergström 1997

= Fortiforceps =

Fortiforceps Temporal range: Cambrian Stage 3

Extinct genus of arthropods

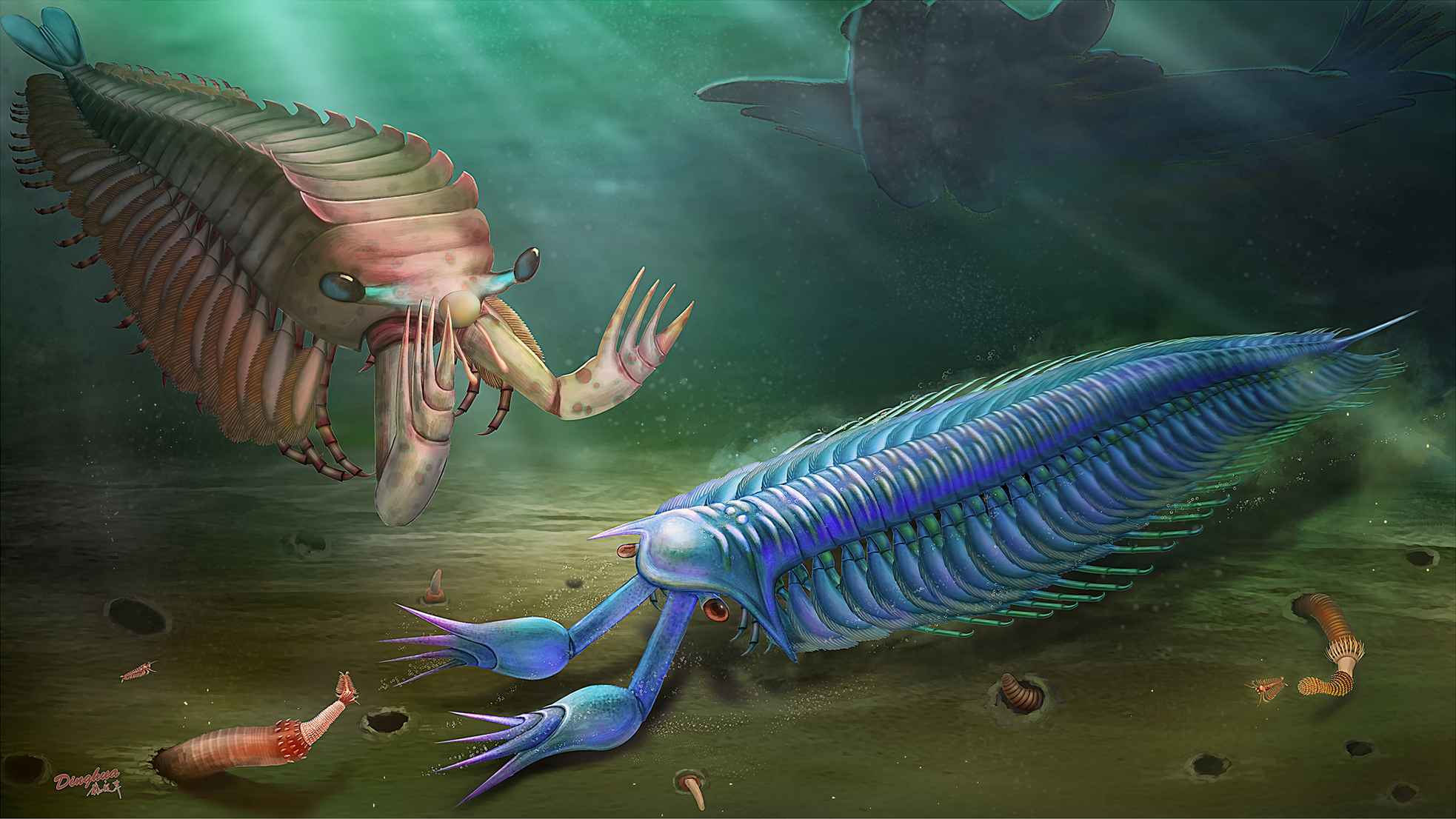
Restoration of Fortiforceps (left) with relative Sklerolibyon (right)

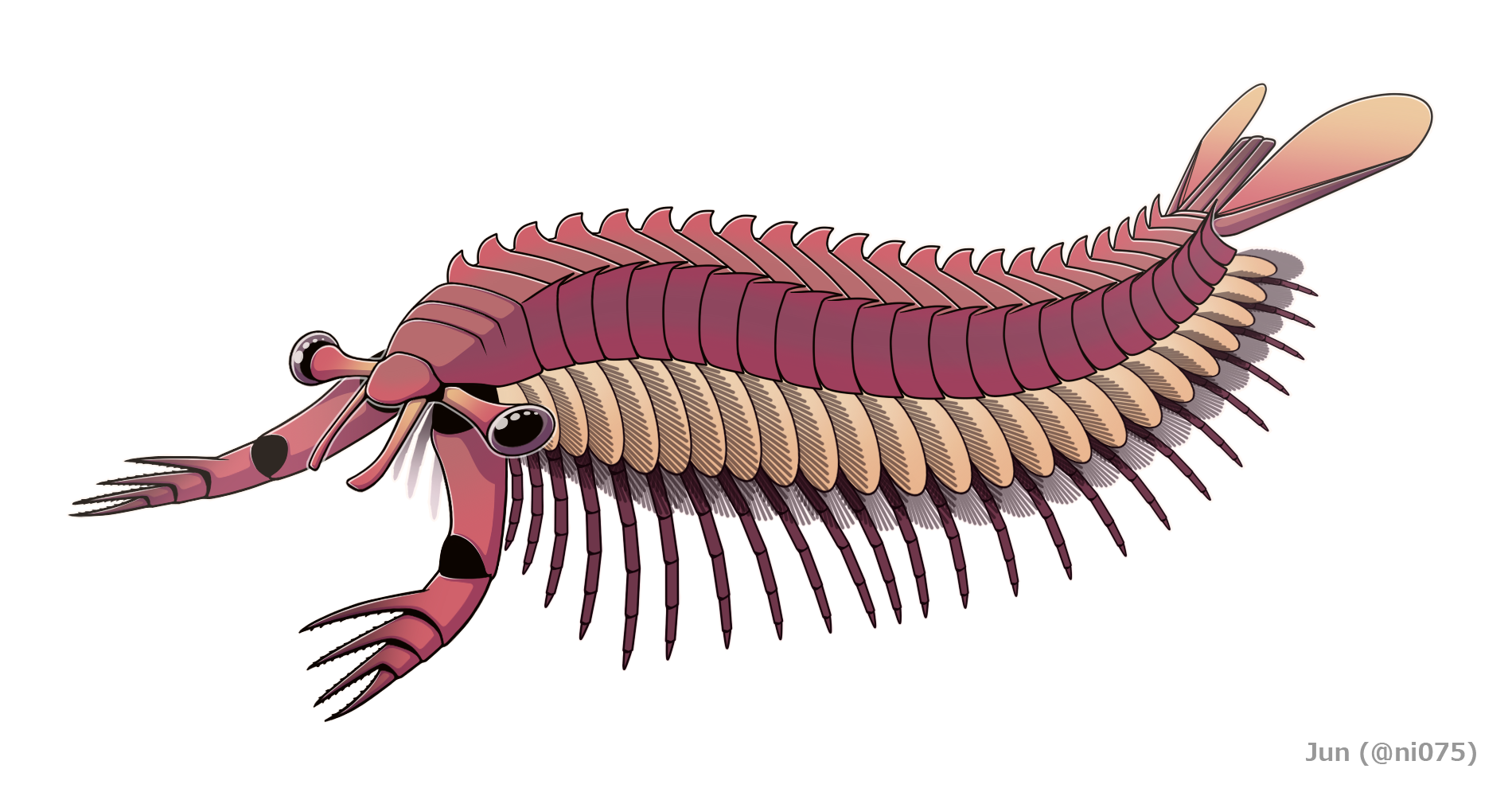
Reconstruction of Fortiforceps foliosa

Fortiforceps is an extinct genus of Cambrian megacheiran marine arthropod known from the Chengjiang biota of Yunnan, China. It was originally described by Hou and Bergström in 1997, and redescribed in 2020. It was relatively small, at 4 centimetres (1.6 in) or less in length. The head had a pair of large, stalked eyes, a pair of frontal projections, as well as a pair of great appendages, like other megacheirans, along with two other cephalic appendages. The trunk had either 20 or 22 segments, depending on the specimen. These segments had pronounced blade-like spines on their upper-outer edge. Each of the trunk segments (aside from the last, typically 20th segment) were associated with pairs of biramous limbs, which probably have seven podomeres and like other megacheirans, have paddle-shaped exopods. The trunk terminated with a forked tailpiece, which on their outer edges had rod-like structures. The two lobes were separated by a rectangular central piece. It has been placed as a member of the family Jiangfengiidae, alongside Jianfengia, Sklerolibyon and possibly Parapeytoia.
