= Borchgrevinkium =

Borchgrevinkium Temporal range: Lochkovian, 416–411.2 Ma
- Restoration of B. taimyrensis

Scientific classification
- Kingdom: Animalia
- Phylum: Arthropoda
- Subphylum: Chelicerata
- Clade: Euchelicerata
- Clade: Prosomapoda (?)
- Genus: †Borchgrevinkium; Novojilov, 1959

Type species
- †Borchgrevinkium taimyrensis Novojilov, 1959

Extinct genus of arthropods

Borchgrevinkium is an extinct genus of chelicerate arthropod. A fossil of the single and type species, B. taimyrensis, has been discovered in deposits of the Early Devonian period (Lochkovian epoch) in the Krasnoyarsk Krai, Siberia, Russia. The name of the genus honors Carsten Borchgrevink, an Anglo-Norwegian explorer who participated in many expeditions to Antarctica. Borchgrevinkium represents a poorly known genus whose affinities are uncertain.

It had several unique characteristics that differentiated it from many other arthropods, such as its long parabolic (nearly U-shaped) prosoma (head), its elongated first and second segments and the presence of paired "ridges" in the surface of its third to tenth tergites (dorsal halves of the segments). Furthermore, the opisthosoma (the "trunk") of Borchgrevinkium was triangular, and its telson (the posteriormost division of its body), short and wedge-shaped. It was a small animal, approximately 3 centimetres (1.2 inches) long.

The only known specimen of the genus was collected in 1956 and described in 1959 by the Russian paleontologist Nestor Ivanovich Novojilov. He determined that it was a eurypterid and classified it in the family Mycteroptidae. However, its classification changed repeatedly over the years, being transferred from Eurypterida to Xiphosura and back to Eurypterida some time later. Borchgrevinkium is tentatively considered as a prosomapod, with more fossil material needed to ensure its current classification.

== Description ==
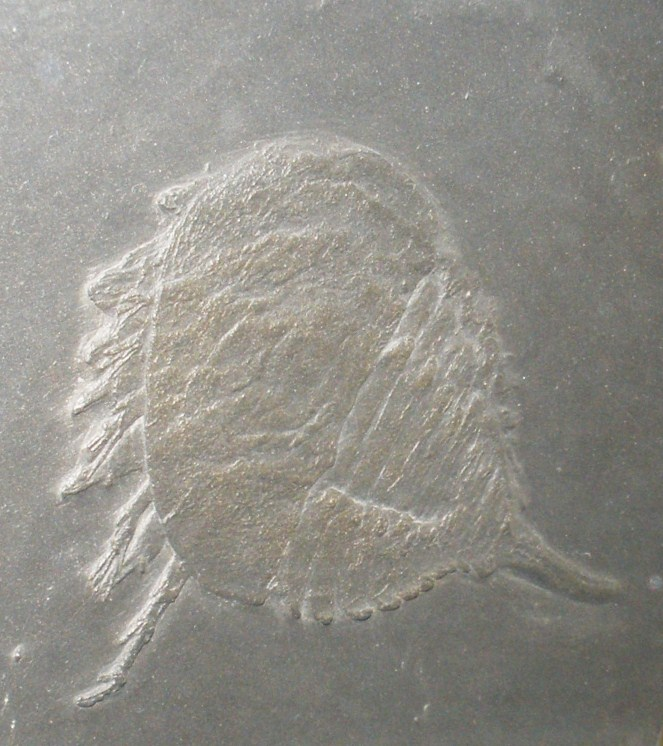
Fossil of Weinbergina opitzi, a possibly related genus in the clade Prosomapoda. Borchgrevinkium might belong to this clade as well.

The size of the only known specimen of Borchgrevinkium, identified with the label PIN 1271/1, is estimated more or less at 3 centimetres (1.2 inches), making it a small arthropod.

The prosoma was oblong (covering more than one third of the length of the animal), parabolic (nearly U-shaped) and with a length of 1.35 cm (0.53 in). The eyes are not preserved and therefore, their position or shape is unknown. The prosomal appendages (limbs) are only known by the tip of poorly preserved left pairs. They were short, undifferentiated and spiniferous. The opisthosoma (the "trunk") was triangular and 1.23 cm (0.48 in) long. It was composed of 12 segments, with the first one being exceptionally long and forming with the second segment an "extension" of the prosoma. The genital appendage (a ventral "rod" part of the reproductive system) of Borchgrevinkium was long, spanning from its first to its second segment.

The tergites (dorsal halves of the segments) had distal (outwards-pointing) lobes on their sides. Furthermore, the third to tenth tergites had on their surfaces converging paired "folds" or "ridges" that delimitated the dorsal and lateral parts of the opisthosoma and progressively narrowed to the center of the tenth tergite. These ridges were almost parallel to the edges of the opisthosoma. On the eleventh tergite, the edges were slightly curved. The pretelson (the segment that preceded the telson) had a bifid (divided into two lobes) dorsal projection. The telson (the posteriormost division of the body) was cuneiform (wedge-like), short and narrow, and measured 0.45 cm (0.18 in). The ornamentation of the body was composed by short scales with broadly rounded edges.

== History of research ==
Location of Norilsk, city near of which the only known specimen of B. taimyrensis has been found (the exact location is unknown)

In 1956, V. V. Menner Jr., of the Institute of Petroleum of the USSR Academy of Sciences, discovered a series of fossils in Devonian deposits near the Imangda River at the southwest of the Taymyr Peninsula, near Norilsk, in the Krasnoyarsk Krai (Russia, then the Soviet Union). He sent them to the Russian paleontologist Nestor Ivanovich Novojilov, who in 1959 described, among others, a specimen labelled as PIN 1271/1, which was more or less complete. It was deposited in the Paleontological Institute of the Russian Academy of Sciences, in Moscow, where it remains. Novojilov considered it unique enough to be erected as a new genus, Borchgrevinkium, named after the Anglo-Norwegian explorer Carsten Borchgrevink for his expeditions to Antarctica. He compared it with the then xiphosuran genus Weinbergina, assuming that Borchgrevinkium was also a xiphosuran. However, the Norwegian paleontologist Leif Størmer, who assisted him during his study, noticed that what Novojilov had considered to be an accidental fissure was actually part of the "macrosegment" (the first segment). On re-examining the specimen, Novojilov also found the tips of the appendages. The presence of this macrosegment convinced Novojilov that Borchgrevinkium represented a new eurypterid, and he classified it as such.

In 1966, the American paleontologist Erik Norman Kjellesvig-Waering, during a study on the families and genera of the superfamily Stylonuracea (now known as Stylonuroidea), tentatively recorded an Upper Silurian occurrence of the genus Borchgrevinkium apart from the Lower Devonian one, believing that a new specimen had been found. This specimen was later named as "Borchgrevinkium sp.". In 2017, the British geologist and paleobiologist James C. Lamsdell and the Irish palaeontologist Derek Briggs found that this specimen was YPM IP 300790, collected in the Bertie Group in the state of New York in 1967 by Samuel J. Ciurca, Jr., who identified it as a new undescribed species of Borchgrevinkium after contacting Størmer. Nevertheless, since this specimen was misidentified, it was redescribed as a new species of the chasmataspidid Diploaspis, D. praecursor, by Lamsdell and Briggs.

The history of Borchgrevinkium soon became turbulent, being classified as a xiphosuran in 1989, and back to Eurypterida years later. Borchgrevinkium was tentatively moved by Lamsdell in 2013 to the clade (taxonomic group) Prosomapoda.

== Classification ==
Size comparison of B. taimyrensis and an American quarter

Novojilov, during his description of Borchgrevinkium, noted a certain resemblance to Weinbergina, especially for the paired "ridges" that both have on their tergites. Based on the aforementioned macrosegment, Novojilov classified the genus as a mycteroptid eurypterid and compared it to the species Mycterops matthieui and Woodwardopterus scabrosus (members of the family), without finding many similarities but still classifying Borchgrevinkium in the eurypterid group. Nowadays, however, his descriptions are considered inexhaustive and based only on the best preserved material. Nevertheless, the genus continued being considered by other authors as a eurypterid. In 1966, Kjellesvig-Waering classified Borchgrevinkium with Woodwardopterus in the family Woodwardopteridae. He based this conclusion on its walking legs, which he considered typical of stylonuraceans, and on the similarity of the ornamentation and the exceptional size of the first two segments of both.

In 1972, Størmer questioned the affiliation of the genus in this clade and suggested that it might represent a chasmataspidid within the order Xiphosura. Following this recommendation, Victor P. Tollerton, Jr. reclassified it in 1989 inside this order during his revision of Eurypterida. In 2004, the Norwegian paleontologist Odd Erik Tetlie did not support this change and transferred Borchgrevinkium as eurypterid, again in the family Woodwardopteridae with Woodwardopterus and Mycterops, but now in a different suborder, Woodwardopterina, suggesting that these arthropods actually could not represent eurypterids. The woodwardopterines were presumably united by the great elongation of the first two segments. This point of view was not approved by other researchers, and eventually Woodwardopterina was synonymized with Stylonurina and Woodwardopteridae with Mycteroptidae. In addition, Lamsdell considered the genus as needing a redescription.

Nowadays, Borchgrevinkium is a highly uncertain and problematic genus. Its eurypterid nature was soon denied again in 2013, when Lamsdell placed it in the clade Prosomapoda. It encompasses all chelicerates with prosomal uniramous appendages (appendages composed of a single series of segments attached end-to-end) in the adult stage (excluding the sixth and last pair of appendages). However, the appendages of Borchgrevinkium are poorly known. Lamsdell made a note in it and in Anderella, determining that in order to consolidate the classification of both genera in Prosomapoda, new fossil material is needed.

A phylogenetic analysis (the results presented in a cladogram below) conducted by Lamsdell in 2013 on the relationships within Xiphosura and the relations to other closely related groups concluded that Xiphosura, as presently understood, was paraphyletic (that is, it was a group sharing a last common ancestor but not including all descendants of this ancestor) and thus not a valid phylogenetic group. Prosomapoda was erected to include several chelicerates formerly classified mostly as xiphosurans, as well as the xiphosurans themselves and Planaterga. Borchgrevinkium was not included due to its scarce known material.

- Arachnomorpha
  - †Fuxianhuia
  - - †Antennulata
      - †Emeraldella
      - †Trilobitomorpha
      - †Sidneyia
    - - †Megacheira
        - †Yohoia
        - - †Alalcomenaeus
          - †Leanchoilia
      - Chelicerata
        - Pycnogonida
          - †Palaeoisopus
          - - Pycnogonum
            - †Haliestes
        - Euchelicerata
          - †Offacolus
          - Prosomapoda
            - †Weinbergina
            - - - †Venustulus
                - †Camanchia
              - - †Legrandella
                - - Xiphosura
                    - †Kasibelinurus
                    - - †Willwerathia
                      - Xiphosurida
                        - †Lunataspis
                        - - †Belinurina
                          - Limulina
                  - Planaterga
                    - - †Pseudoniscus
                      - †Cyamocephalus
                    - †Pasternakevia
                    - - †Bunodes
                      - †Limuloides
                    - †Bembicosoma
                    - Dekatriata
                      - †Chasmataspidida
                      - Sclerophorata
                        - Arachnida
                        - †Eurypterida

== Paleoecology ==
The only known specimen of Borchgrevinkium has been recovered in Early Devonian (Lochkovian) deposits of the Taymyr Peninsula in Siberia, Russia. It was found alongside specimens of the chasmataspidids Dvulikiaspis menneri, Heteroaspis stoermeri and Skrytyaspis andersoni, as well as indeterminate eurypterids like Acutiramus. The lithology (physical characteristics of the rocks) of the place has been described as dark gray marls with gypsiferous and dolomitic; rich in dolomite occurrences. The fossils were collected 60 metres (200 feet) below the Early Devonian–Middle Devonian boundary.
