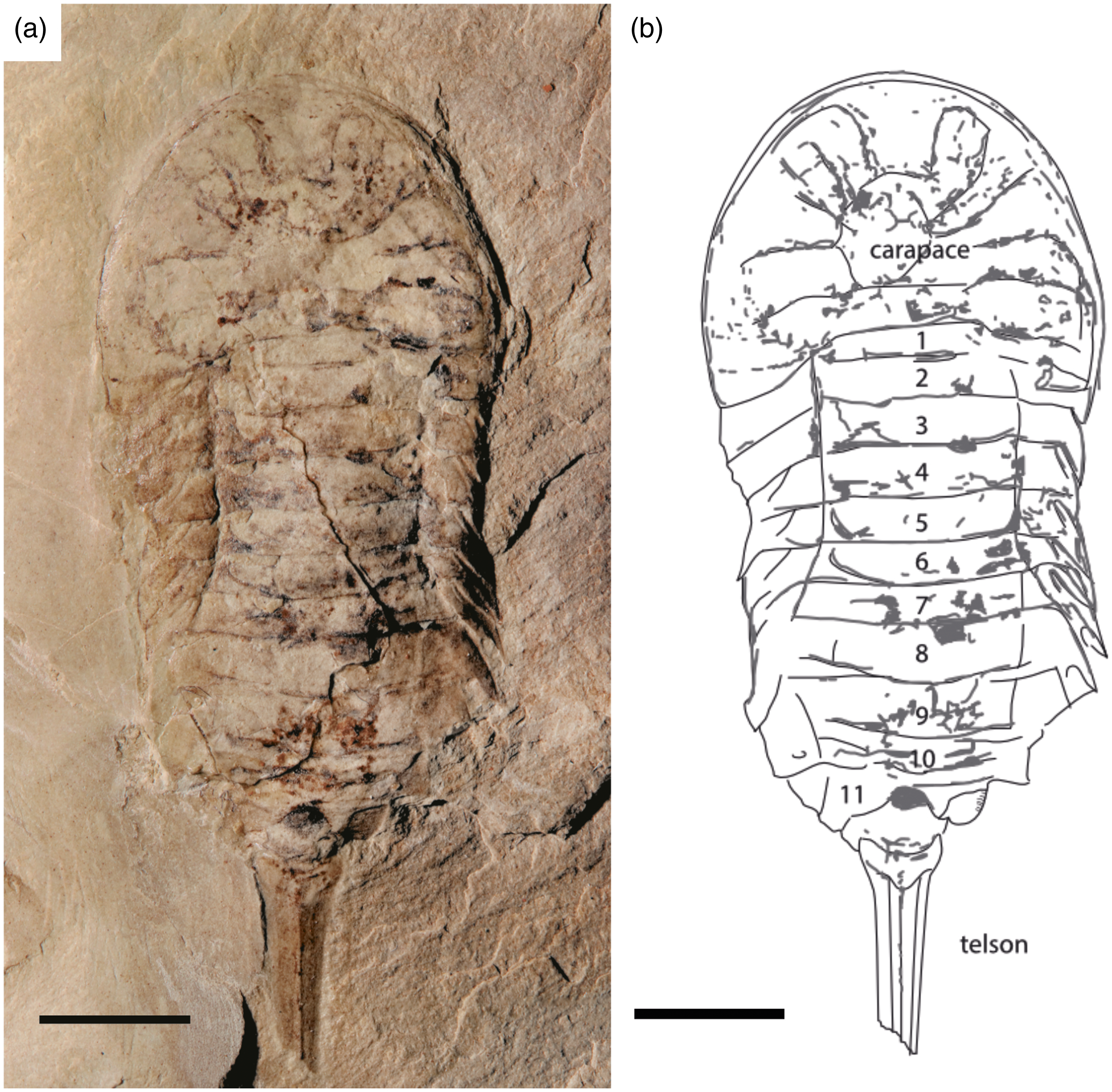
- Picture (left) and annotated diagram (right) of Smotrychaspis holotype

Scientific classification
- Kingdom: Animalia
- Phylum: Arthropoda
- Subphylum: Chelicerata
- Clade: Euchelicerata
- Genus: †Smotrychaspis; Smith & Selden, 2025

Type species
- †Smotrychaspis kurtopleurae Smith & Selden, 2025

= Smotrychaspis =

Smotrychaspis Temporal range: Silurian (Wenlock-Ludlow), 427 Ma

Genus of primitive chelicerate

Smotrychaspis is a genus of chelicerate arthropod from the Silurian aged Ustya Formation of Ukraine. Representing part of the paraphyletic "synziphosurine" grouping of early chelicerates, it closely resembles pseudoniscids and bunodids but its exact relationships are unclear. A very small animal, it is distinguished from other synziphosurines by its smooth carapace, untapering parallel abdomen, and large spikes along both sides of its body, largest near the back of the body.

== Discovery and naming ==
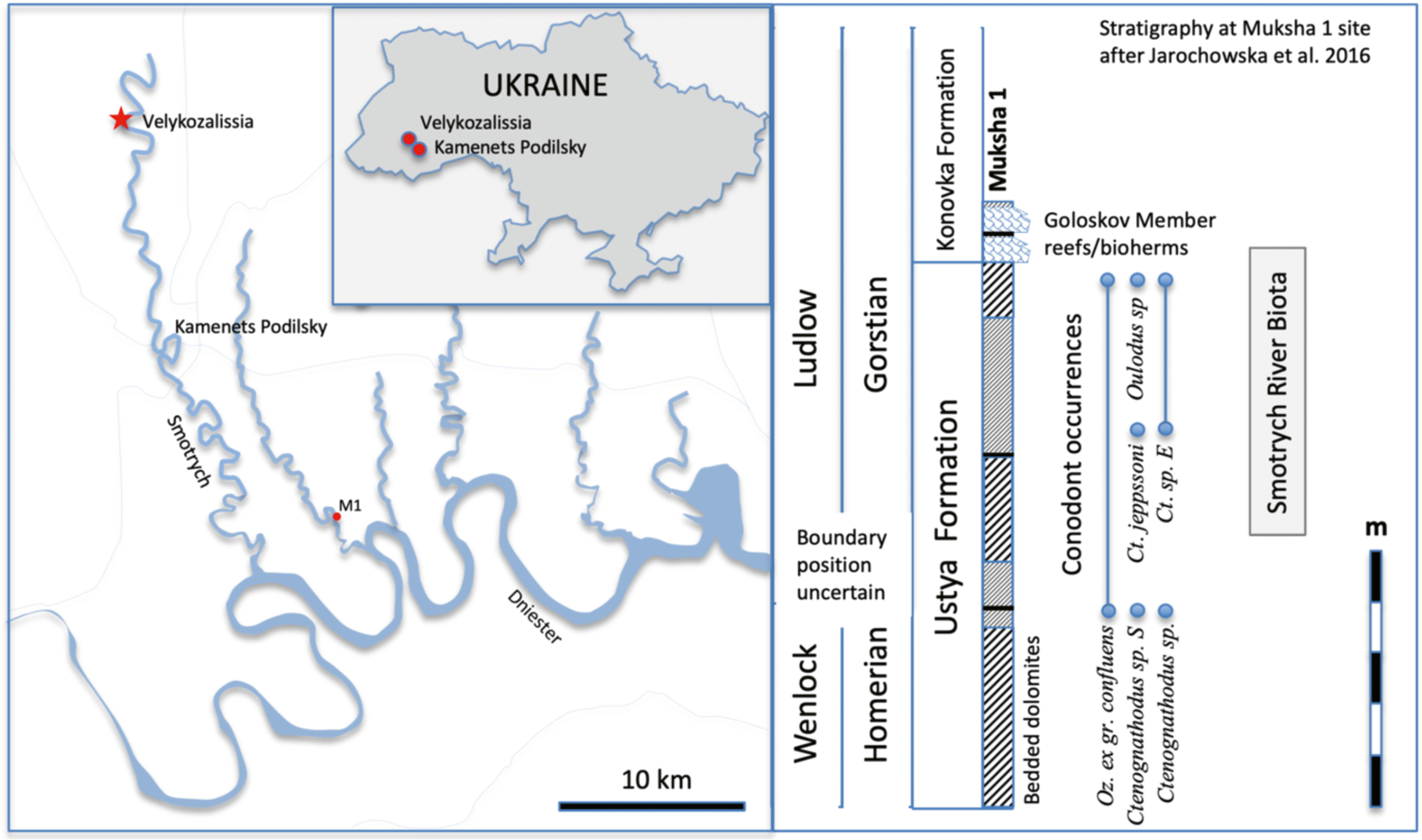
Location and stratigraphy of the Smotrych River fossil locality near Velikozalissia, marked with a red star

A fossil slab and counterslab was discovered by Dmytro Polypenko and his fellow field collectors in the Ustya Formation along the Smotrych River near the village of Velikozalissia in the Podolia region of Ukraine. The slab consisted of a previously undocument synziphosurine arthropod, portions of the previously known synsiphosurine Pasternakevia, eurypterid fragments, and a small orthocone shell. Polypenko allowed Ru D.A. Smith to purchase it, and Smith then donated the specimen to the National Museums of Scotland in Edinburgh, where it was given the specimen number G.2025.2.1.

The new synziphosurine, mostly complete but lacking limbs, appendages, and the end of the telson, was described by Smith and Paul A. Selden in a 2025 study in the journal Geological Magazine. It given the genus name Smotrychaspis, in reference to the river and suffix -aspis, a common suffix for synziphosurines derived from the Greek word ᾰ̓σπίς, "shield". The name of the type and only species, S. kurtopleurae, is derived from the Greek ᾰ̓σπίς, meaning "hook", and "πλϵυρόν", in reference to the hooked edges of the species' segments. It is the first of several new arthropods found in the exceptionally preserved biota of the upper Ustya Formation to be scientifically named. This biota dates to the early Gorstian, or perhaps the late Homerian, age of the Silurian period, and would have represented a shallow sea or lagoon 427 million years ago.

== Description ==
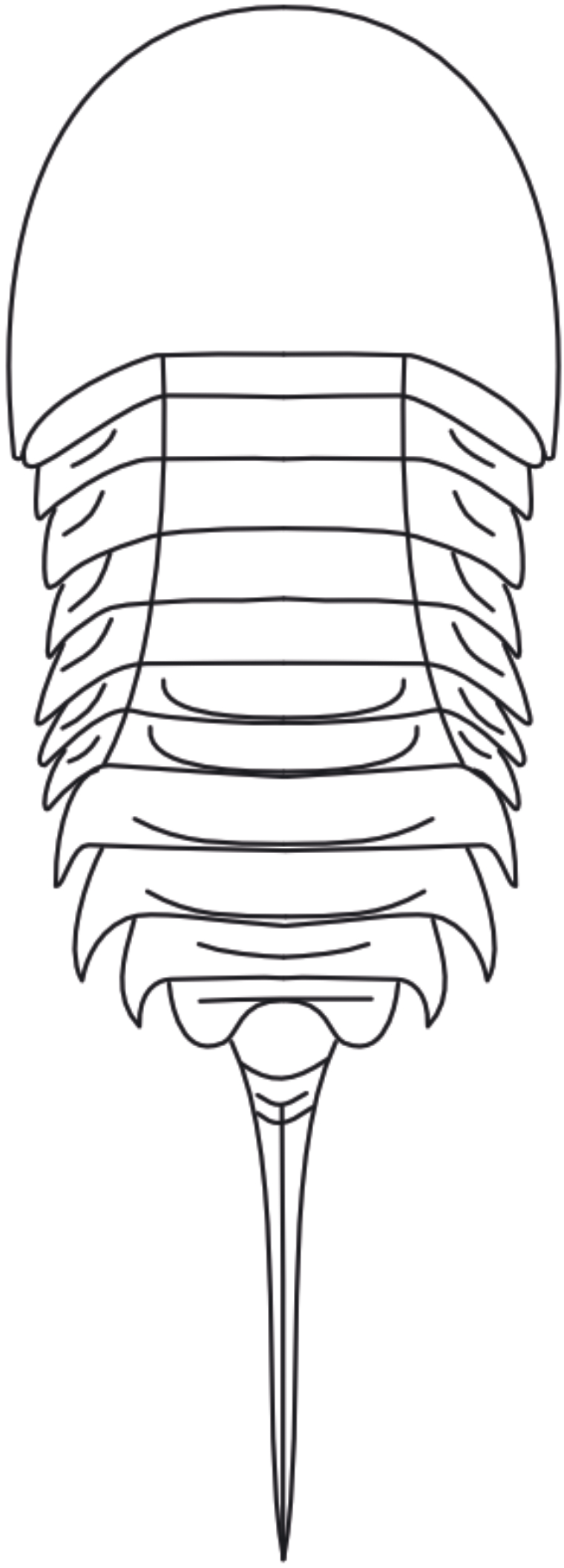
Anatomical diagram

The body of Smotrychaspis was split into three regions: the prosoma (head), the opisthosoma (abdomen), and telson (rear-facing spike). It was a small animal; in the only known specimen, the former two segments are 2.81 centimetres (1.11 in) together, and the telson is at least 0.94 centimetres (0.37 in) long but not fully preserved. The prosoma made up a third of the body, excluding the telson, with the opisthoma making up the other two thirds.

Unlike most other synziphosurans, Smotrychaspis has a very smooth carapace. It lacks a projection at the front of the prosoma, possesses no central cardiac ridge along the centre of the prosoma, lacks ocular ridges for eyes, and lacks any nodes along the middle of its opisthostoma; all of these traits are present in varying combinations in many other synziphosurans. The smooth, horseshoe shaped prosoma has a curved posterior, with the back edges protruding backwards as recurved spikes. What sort of anatomy its appendages (including limbs) may have had cannot be determined as they are unpreserved in the known specimen.

The opisthoma lacks any differentiation between a front and back portion, unlike many other synziphosurans. It is, however, split into eleven segments called tergites; the edges of these tergites have backward-facing spikes known as epimera. The border between the epimera and the core of the segments is visible in the first seven tergites, but unclear from the eighth onwards. The epimera on the second through seventh segments have grooves, absent on the last four. Whereas many synziphosurans show a tapering shape towards the back of the opisthoma, the body of Smotrychaspis is highly parallel and only tapers extremely close to the telson. This is partly due to especially large epimeral spikes on the eighth and ninth segments, which are longer than the sixth and seventh segments. This distinct arrangement is most closely approximated by Cyamocephalus, which also possesses large spikes on its latter segments; however, in this taxon these segments taper in size in a more typical fashion.

The telson spike attaches to the eleventh and final segment, which is narrow, lacking in spikes, and is built around a central depressed area interpreted as an attachment site for a large muscle for moving the telson. The telson itself had a ridge along its top edge, and is stouter than seen in other synziphosurines. This stout shape and prominent muscular likely would have made the organ especially powerful in this genus.

== Classification ==
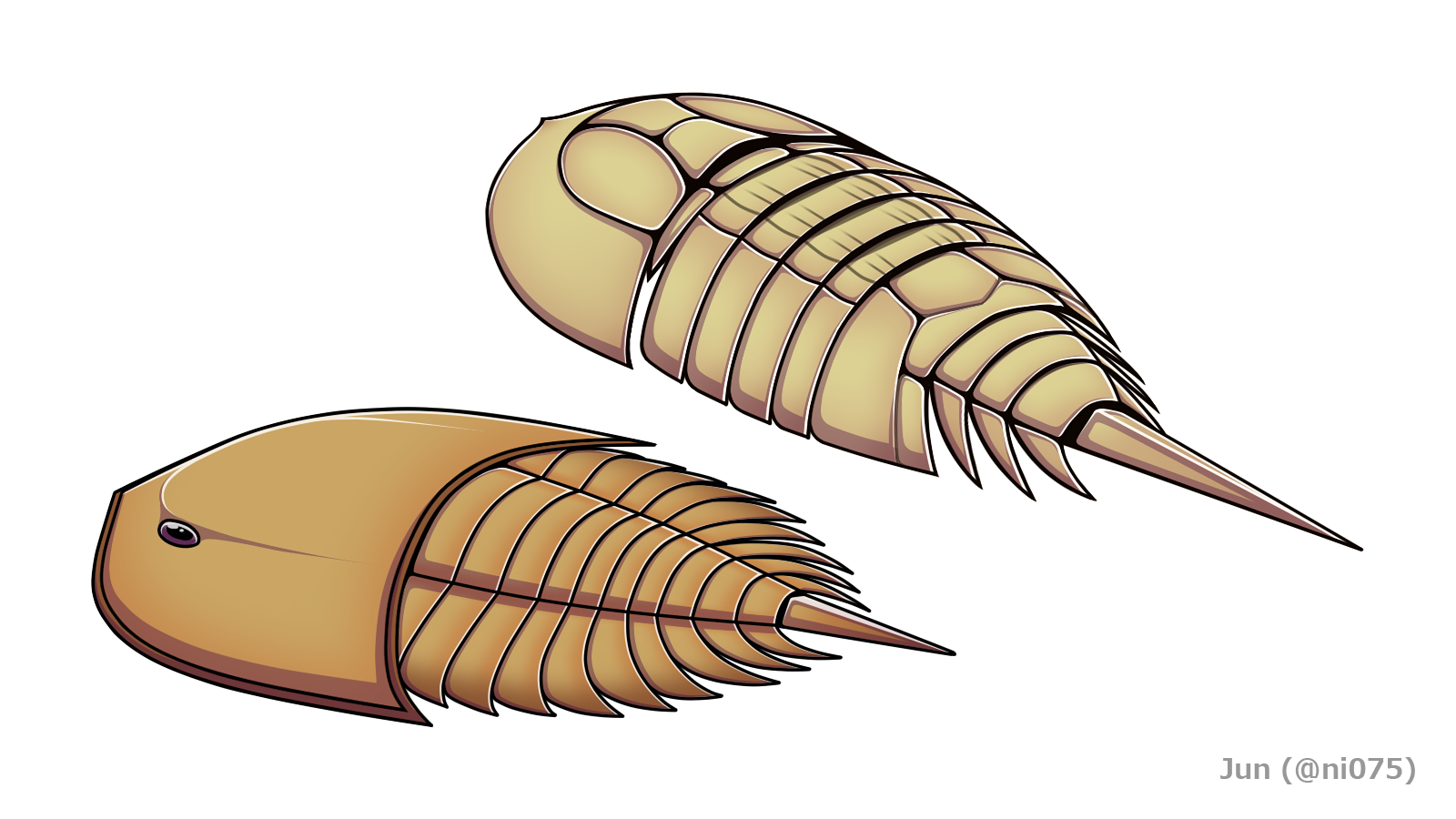
Pseudoniscids Cyamocephalus and Pseudoniscus, among the most similar animals to Smotrychaspis

Smotrychaspis represents a type of arthropod classically grouped in the suborder Synziphosurina; today, synziphosurines are known to be an unnatural polyphyletic grouping of loosely related organisms, not forming a unique clade with respect to other arthropods. All nested around the base of Chelicerata, the group including arachnids, horseshoe crabs, sea spiders and prehistoric sea scorpions. Specifically, different traditional members of Synziphosura appear to be primitive members of Euchelicerata (chelicerates that are not sea spiders), with some being outside of Prosomapoda (euchelicerates lacking branching appendages), some within it, and some within Planaterga, the grouping of chelicerates closer to arachnids and sea scorpions than to horseshoe crabs. The position of Smotrychaspis specifically unclear, and its position is considered to be incertae sedis (uncertain) within Euchelicerata. Especially derived positions within Xiphosura or Dekatriata can be excluded, as can an extremely basal position due to the lack of nodes along its centre as seen in Weinbergina and Legrandella.

Amongst "synziphosurines", Smotrychaspis bears the closest resemblance members of the families Pseudoniscidae and Bunodidae, both nested within Planeterga. It is anatomically similar to pseudoniscidids in most respects, but differs in lacking a median anterior projection (a small protrusion at the front of the head), lacking any fusion of tergites within the opisthoma, and possessing eleven rather than ten tergites.
