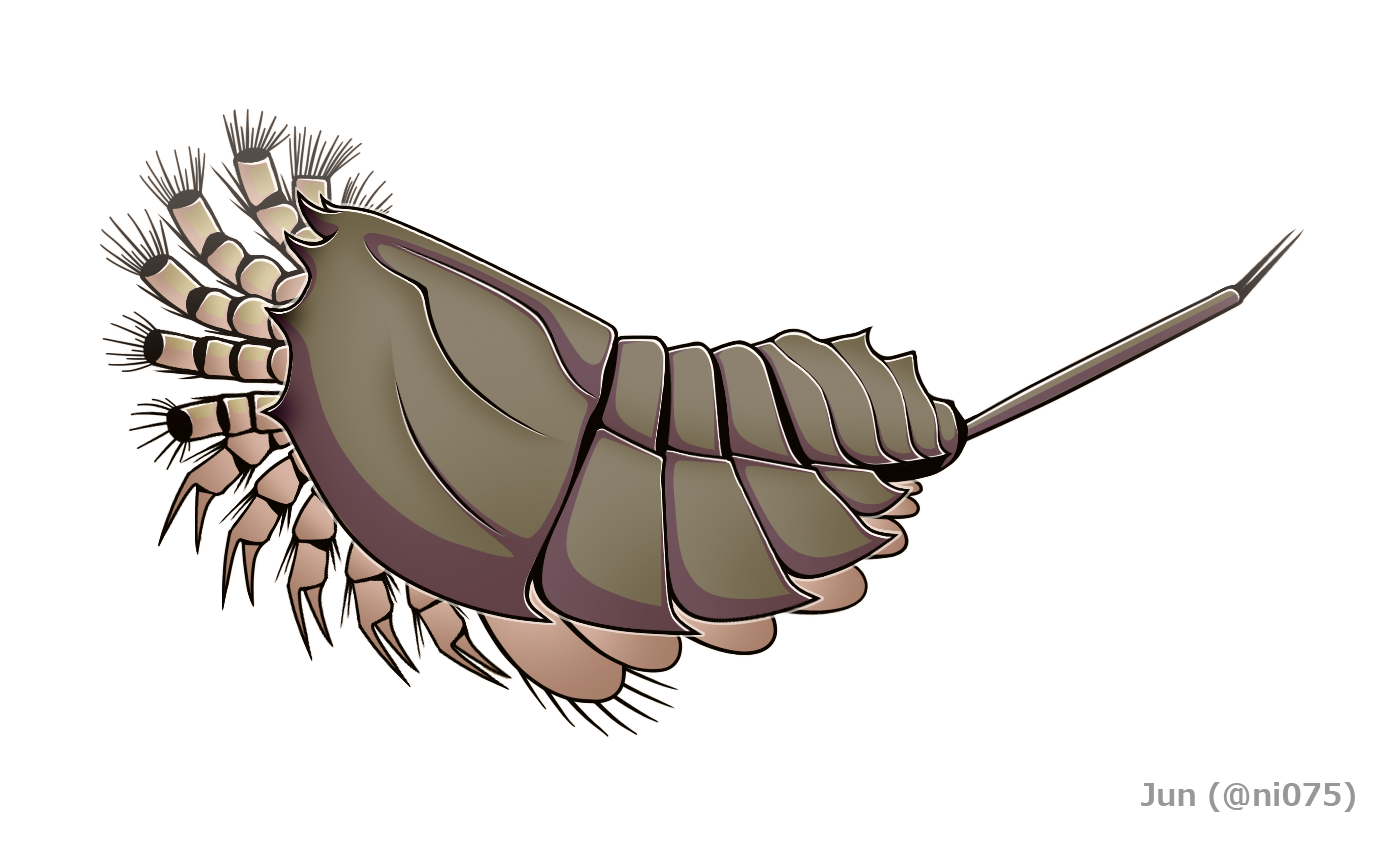
- Reconstruction of Offacolus kingi

Scientific classification
- Kingdom: Animalia
- Phylum: Arthropoda
- Subphylum: Chelicerata
- Clade: Euchelicerata
- Family: †Offacolidae; Sutton et al., 2002
- Genus: †Offacolus; Orr et al., 2000

Type species
- †Offacolus kingi Orr et al., 2000

= Offacolus =

Offacolus Temporal range: Homerian, ~425 Ma

Extinct genus of arthropods

Offacolus is an extinct genus of euchelicerate, a group of chelicerate arthropods. Its only species, O. kingi, has been found in deposits from the Silurian period (Homerian epoch) in the Wenlock Series Lagerstätte of Herefordshire, England. The genus is named after Offa, a king from the ancient kingdom of Mercia, and colus, a person who dwelled among (this time referring to) the Offa's Dyke. The species name honors Robert Joseph King, a British mineralogist who found the fossils of Offacolus.

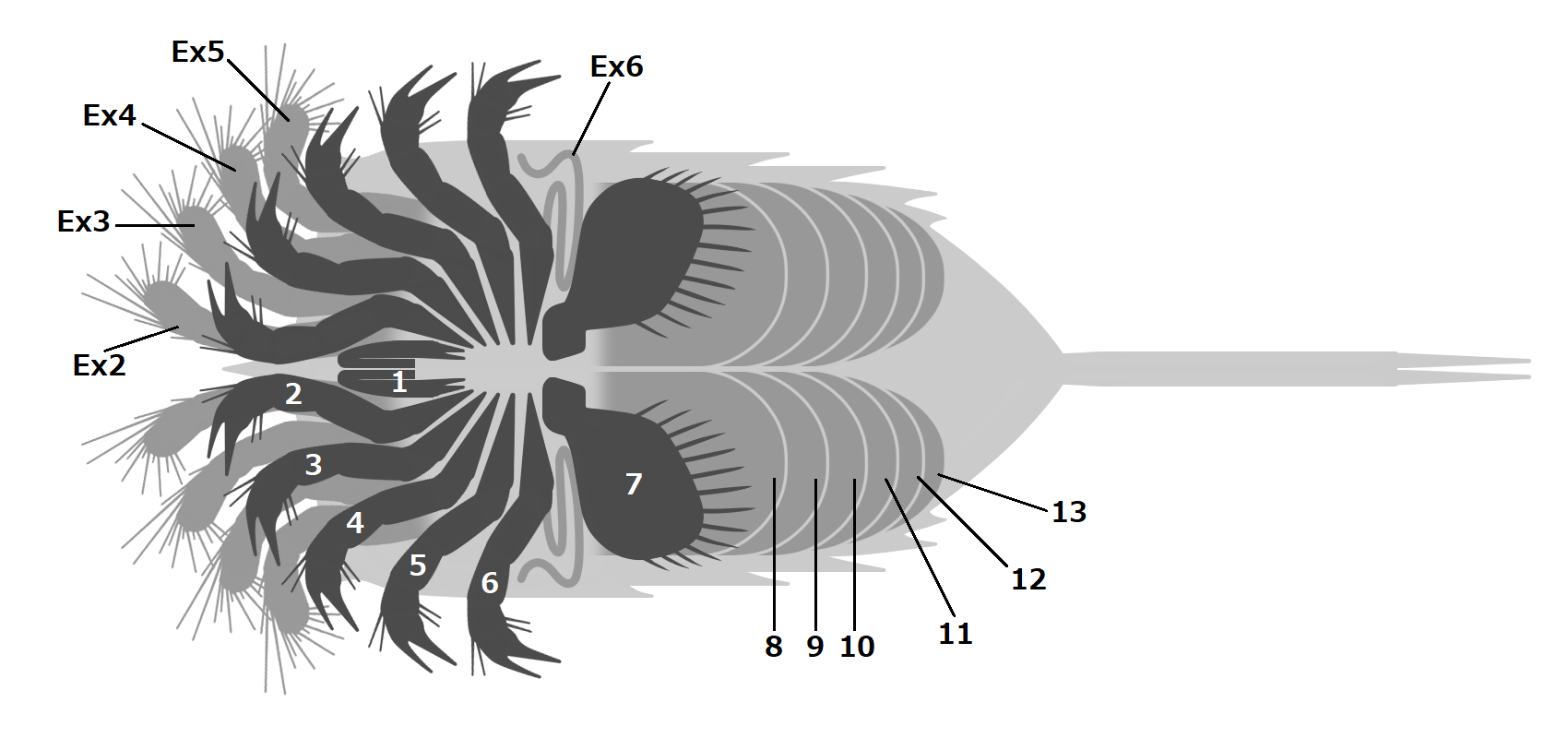
Ventral appendages of Offacolus kingi, showing limb-like exopods (Ex2-5)

Similar to Dibasterium, Offacolus possess limb-like exopods (outer limb branches) on appendage II to V, a character suggest to be plesiomorphic (observable in the putative stem-chelicerate taxon Habeliida) and lost within the prosomapod clade.

== Classification ==
Offacolus was originally described as an arthropod with chelicerate affinities, with detailed redescription done by Sutton et al. 2002 further suggested it to be unambiguously a chelicerate arthropod. O. kingi was once considered the only member of the monotypic family Offacolidae. This family currently includes along with O. kingi, Dibasterium and Setapedites and represent the sister group of Prosomapoda.

A phylogenetic analysis (the results presented in a cladogram below) conducted by James Lamsdell in 2013 on the relationships within the Xiphosura and the relations to other closely related groups concluded that the Xiphosura, as presently understood, was paraphyletic (a group sharing a last common ancestor but not including all descendants of this ancestor) and thus not a valid phylogenetic group. Offacolus was recovered as the sister taxon (closest relative) of Prosomapoda.

- - Chelicerata
    - Pycnogonida
      - †Palaeoisopus
      - - Pycnogonum
        - †Haliestes
    - Euchelicerata
      - †Offacolus
      - Prosomapoda
        - †Weinbergina
        - - - †Venustulus
            - †Camanchia
          - - †Legrandella
            - - Xiphosura
                - †Kasibelinurus
                - - †Willwerathia
                  - Xiphosurida
                    - †Lunataspis
                    - - †Belinurina
                      - Limulina
              - Planaterga
                - - †Pseudoniscus
                  - †Cyamocephalus
                - †Pasternakevia
                - - †Bunodes
                  - †Limuloides
                - †Bembicosoma
                - Dekatriata
                  - †Chasmataspidida
                  - Sclerophorata
                    - Arachnida
                    - †Eurypterida
