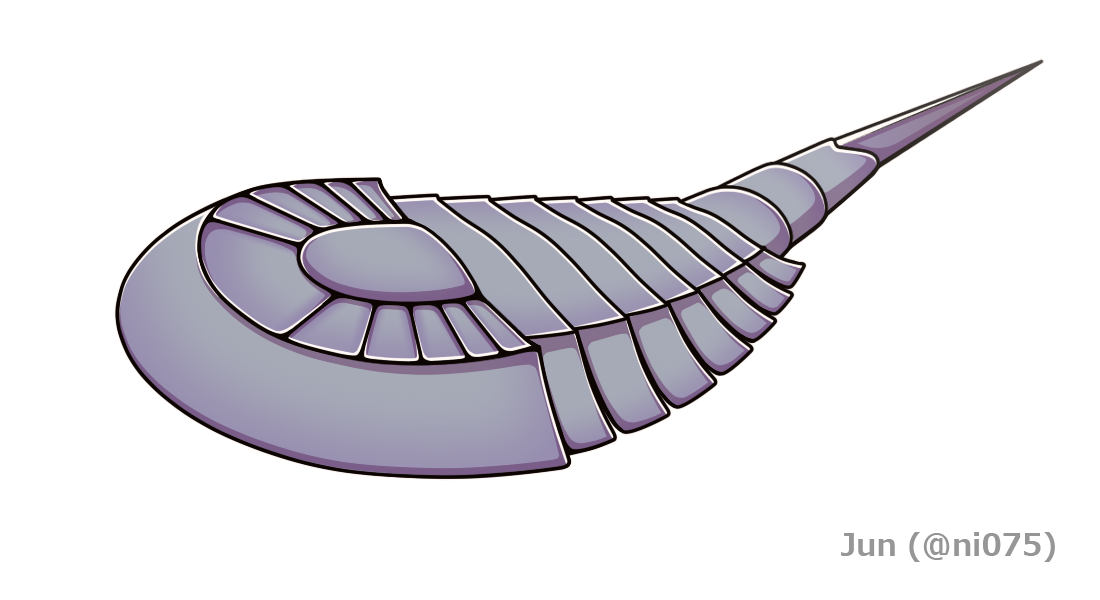
- Reconstruction of Venustulus waukeshaensis

Scientific classification
- Kingdom: Animalia
- Phylum: Arthropoda
- Subphylum: Chelicerata
- Clade: Euchelicerata
- Clade: Prosomapoda
- Genus: †Venustulus; Moore, 2005

Type species
- †Venustulus waukeshaensis Moore, 2005

= Venustulus =

Venustulus Temporal range: Silurian, (Telychian) 437.5–436.5 Ma

Extinct genus of chelicerate from Wisconsin

Venustulus is a genus of synziphosurine, a paraphyletic group of fossil chelicerate arthropods. Venustulus was regarded as part of the clade Prosomapoda. Fossils of the single and type species, V. waukeshaensis, have been discovered in deposits of the Silurian period in Wisconsin, in the United States. Venustulus is one of the few synziphosurine genera with fossil showing evidence of appendages, the other ones being Weinbergina, Anderella and Camanchia. Despite often being aligned close to horseshoe crabs, it has been found that Venustulus and its relatives form a group made up of various basal euchelicerate arthropods more distant to the xiphosurans.

== Description ==
Venustulus is the third largest member of its grouping just behind Willwerathia and Weinbergina respectively. This arthropod appears to be blind due to the lack of eyes on its carapace, suggesting it lived either in deep water or buried in the sediments. Unlike modern horseshoe crabs, the prosomal appendages of Venustulus covered less of the total carapace length. The animals carapace is semi-circular in shape and has a procurved posterior area. The genal areas (sides of the head) of the arthropod are angular in shape, but are not developed into the genal spines seen on some trilobites and xiphosurans. The opisthosomal region of the arthropod is mainly composed of ten articulating segments. This creature was once considered the earliest known member of its grouping, however more recently synziphosuran fossils have been found in earlier Ordovician deposits. This arthropods five-six pair of appendages contrasts the seven usually seen in other synziphosurans, possibly suggesting that this creature represents a more derived form than other members of its grouping.

== History of research ==
The genus name Venustulus derives from Latin and means "charming". The species name waukeshaensis is derived from the town of Waukesha where the biota containing the fossils is found. This chelicerate, along with many of the other animals of the biota (like Parioscorpio and Thylacares) were discovered in 1985, but were not given scientific names until decades later. Venustulus was formally described in 2005, and was based on eight specimens that are currently held in the UW–Madison Geology Museum. These specimens vary in quality with three being almost complete and the other five only being the prosoma and opisthosoma of the arthropod.

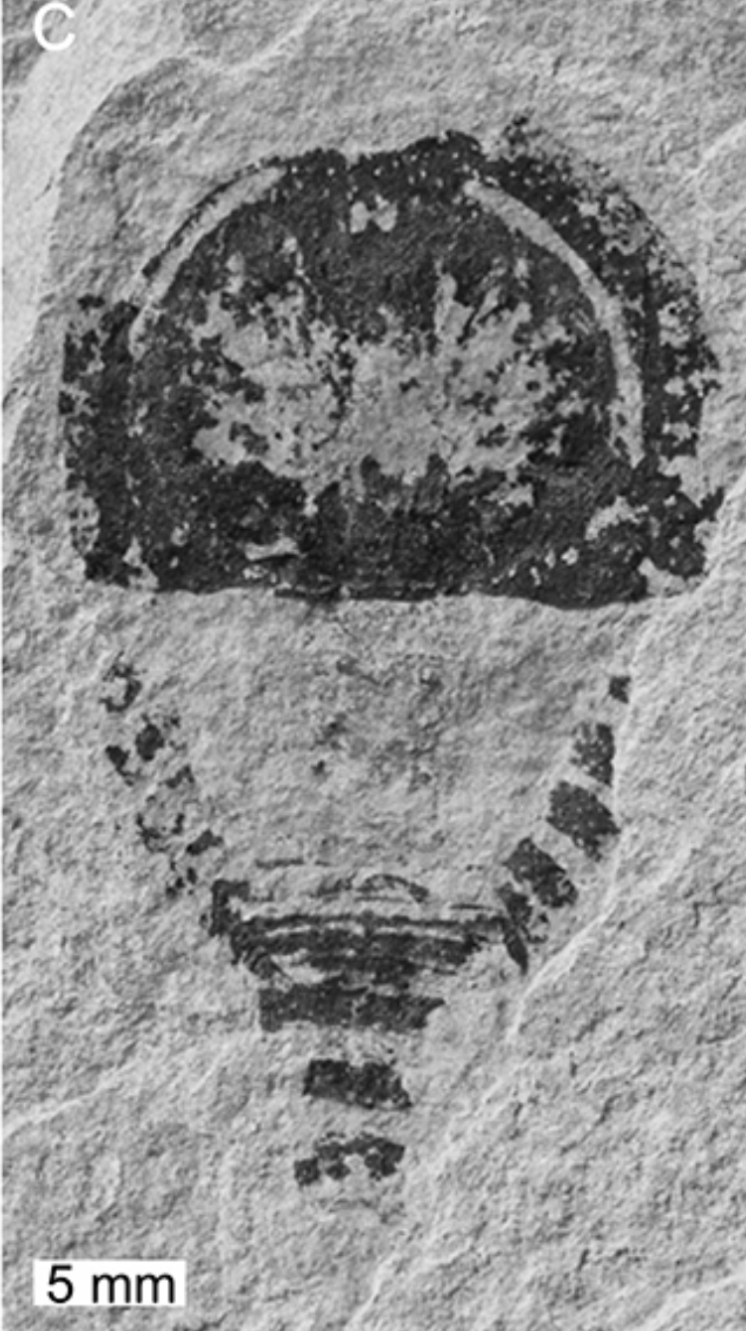
A fossil of Venustulus

== Classification ==
The synziphosuran grouping is divided into multiple families including the Bunodidae, the Pseudoniscidae, and the Weinberginidae. Although the taxonomic relationships of Venustulus are still up for debate, the paper that described it noted that the arthropod has shared characteristics more similar to the weinberginid synziphosurans Weinbergina, Legrandella and Willwerathia. As a group the synziphosurans were first regarded as basal members of the xiphosuran lineage, however more recently they have been found to be more closely related to more primitive chelicerate arthropods and only distantly related to the xiphosurans.

== Paleoecology ==
The oceans that covered Waukesha were a diverse and bustling ecosystem that housed a variety of strange fauna. Arthropods like Venustulus were abundant and diverse with many species of trilobites, a possible cheloniellid, a thylacocephalan, phyllocarids, and several arthropods like Parioscorpio and the "butterfly animal" being enigmatic in their taxonomy. Also inhabiting the area were multiple soft-bodied animals like annelid worms and lobopodians. Multiple chordates also lived in the area evidenced by fossils including an extremely rare body fossil of the conodont Panderodus. Bizarrely, animals like brachiopods, cephalopods, clams, snails, crinoids, and sponges which are common in most Silurian environments, are rarely found in this biota, but conulariids are still somewhat common. Interestingly it seems there could be another possible synziphosuran from the same deposits as Venustulus, but the fossils are too fragmentary to consider it a unique genus.
