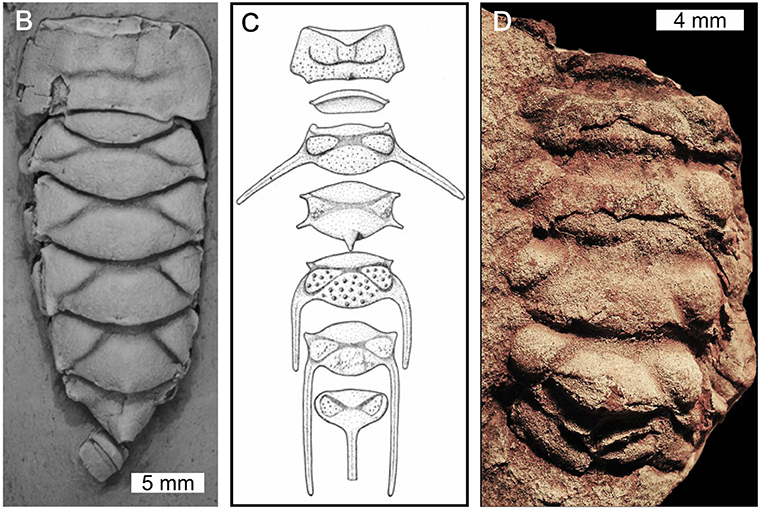
- Multiple species of Maldybulakia, M. malcomi (B), M. angusi (C), M. mirabilis (D).

Scientific classification
- Kingdom: Animalia
- Phylum: Arthropoda
- Class: incertae sedis
- Genus: †Maldybulakia; Tesakov & Alekseev, 1998

Species
- M. mirabilis Tesakov & Alekseev, 1992 (type); M. angusi Edgecombe, 1998; M. malcomi Edgecombe, 1998; M. saierensis Zong et al., 2023

Synonyms
- Lophodesmus Tesakov & Alekseev, 1992

= Maldybulakia =

Maldybulakia Temporal range: Pridoli–Frasnian

Extinct arthropod genus

Maldybulakia is a genus of freshwater arthropod which lived during Late Silurian to Late Devonian. Maldybulakia is known from three species, M. angusi and M. malcolmi from Australia, M. mirabilis from Kazakhstan, and M. saierensis from China. Its classification is uncertain, it was originally described as a myriapod-like animal, and later considered related to the xiphosurans, or an artiopod.

== Discovery and etymology ==
In 1992, the type species of Maldybulakia is described from the Pragian to Emsian-aged Sheshen'karinskaya Formation (also known as the Sheshenkarinskoy Suite) in central Kazakhstan, with scientific name Lophodesmus mirabilis. The genus name Lophodesmus came from the Greek lophos ("tubercle") and desmos ("bond"), and the species name mirabilis means "wonderful" in Latin. However, this genus name is already used for an extant genus of myriapod, and in 1998, the new genus name Maldybulakia, named after Maldybulak Farm in the Bayanaul District, Pavlodar Region in Kazakhstan, was given to the animal. In addition, in 1998, two new species of Maldybulakia were described from two localities in the Devonian of New South Wales. M. angusi is described from the Lochkovian to earliest Pragian-aged Sugarloaf Creek Formation, M. malcomi is from Saltwater Creek Forest Road, usually regarded as Middle Devonian in age though some fossil contents give estimation between the Givetian to the Frasnian. The two species were named after Australian musicians Malcolm and Angus Young. In 2023, new species M. saierensis is described from Pridoli-aged 'Xiemisitai' Formation in Saier Mountains, Hoboksar, western Junggar, Xinjiang, northwest China, and it is the earliest record of the genus.

== Morphology ==
Maldybulakia is a large-sized arthropod around 10 cm (3.9 in), characterized with flat diplosegments like myriapods. M. malcomi had trunks up to 11.5 cm (4.5 in), and had relatively minor serial variation on the pleurotergites. M. malcomi lacked long paratergal spines, posteromedian spines, and tuberculation. M. angusi had considerable serial variation on the pleurotergites. M. angusi is characterized with very long paratergal spines on the most bilobate trunk pleurotergites. Inferred width across spines up to approximately 11.5 cm (4.5 in). M. saierensis is characterized by having long paratergal spines on pleurotergites. Width of paratergal spines measures up to over 31.67 mm (1.247 in).

== Paleoecology ==
All species of Maldybulakia are known from freshwater sediments. According to the only associated fossils, the abundant lycopod flora with M. malcolmi and the presence of spiracles suggests terrestrial habits for Maldybulakia. M. saierensis from late Silurian is the oldest body fossil of a putative freshwater arthropod other than from Laurussia.

== Classification ==
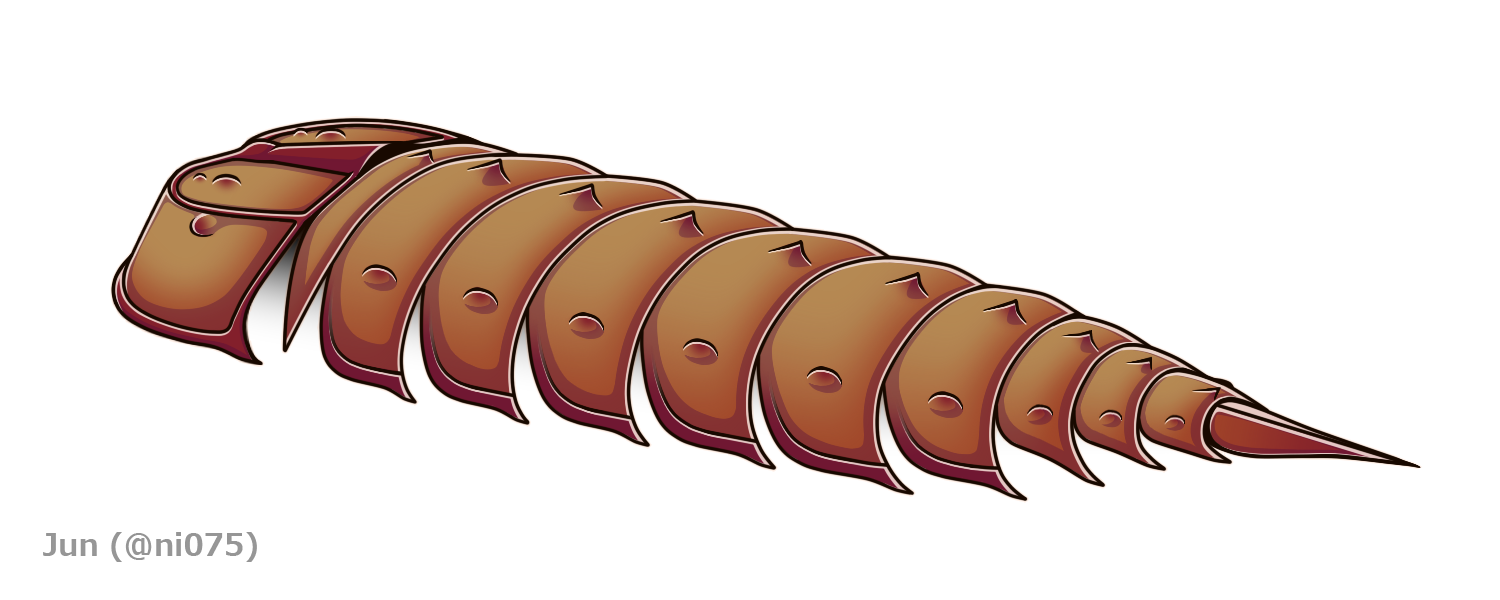
Reconstruction of Willwerathia, xiphosuran possibly related to Maldybulakia.

Due to lack of information on the cephalic structure, appendages, position of the gonopore and genital morphology, it is controversial where to place Maldybulakia within Arthropoda. In 1992, it was classified as Arthropoda incertae sedis, as its characteristics did not permit its identification as a members of Kampecarida, Euthycarcinoidea and Arthropleurida. In 1998, it was classified as a possible Dignatha in Myriapoda, rather than the alternatively proposed Crustacea. After 2010s, Maldybulakia is commonly treated as a xiphosuran, a group including modern horseshoe crabs, due to morphological similarity with the synziphosurine Willwerathia. In 2020, morphology of Willwerathia is compared to Cambrian artiopod Falcatamacaris. Since known fossils are incomplete, taxonomic positions is not discussed at description of M. saierensis.
