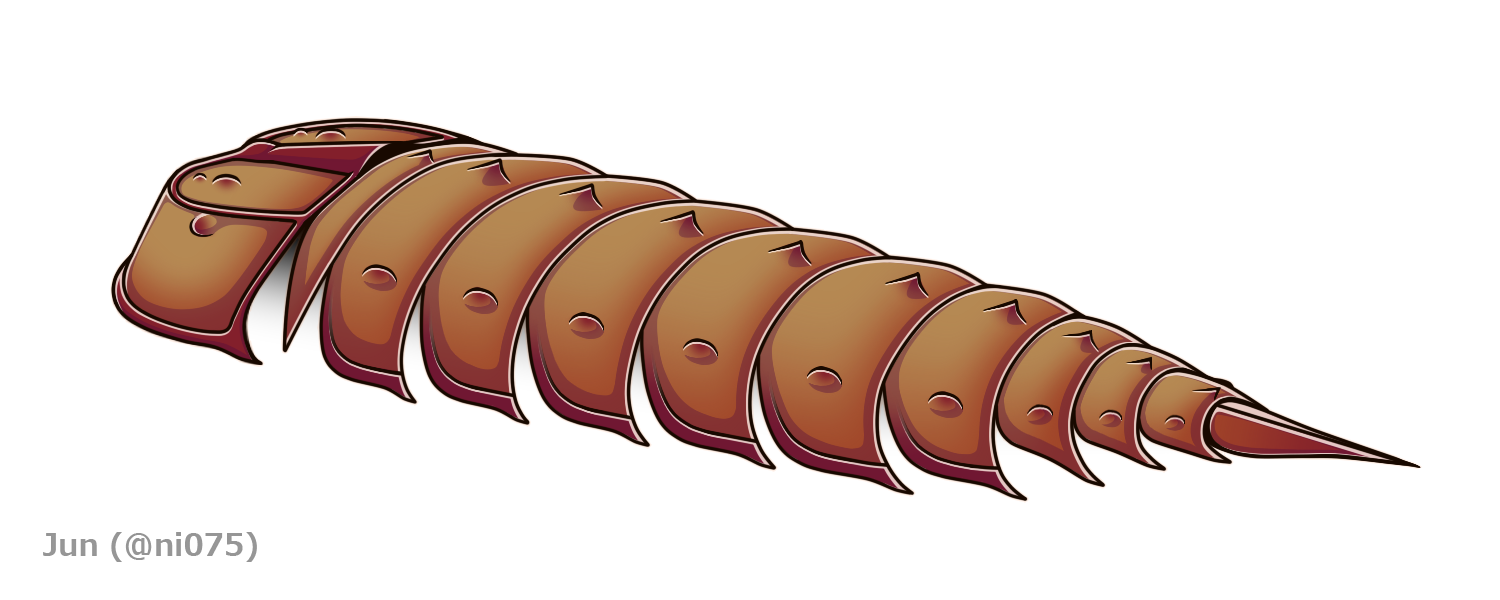
- Reconstruction of Willwerathia laticeps

Scientific classification
- Kingdom: Animalia
- Phylum: Arthropoda
- Subphylum: ?Chelicerata
- Order: ?Xiphosura
- Genus: †Willwerathia Størmer, 1969

Species
- Willwerathia laticeps (Størmer, 1936a)

= Willwerathia =

Willwerathia Temporal range: Lower Devonian

Genus of Devonian arthropod

Willwerathia is a genus of Devonian arthropod. It is sometimes classified as synziphosurine, a paraphyletic group of horseshoe crab-like fossil chelicerate arthropods, while some studies compare its morphology to an artiopod. Willwerathia known only by one species, Willwerathia laticeps, discovered in deposits of the Devonian period from the Klerf Formation, in the Rhenish Slate Mountains of Germany.

== Morphology ==
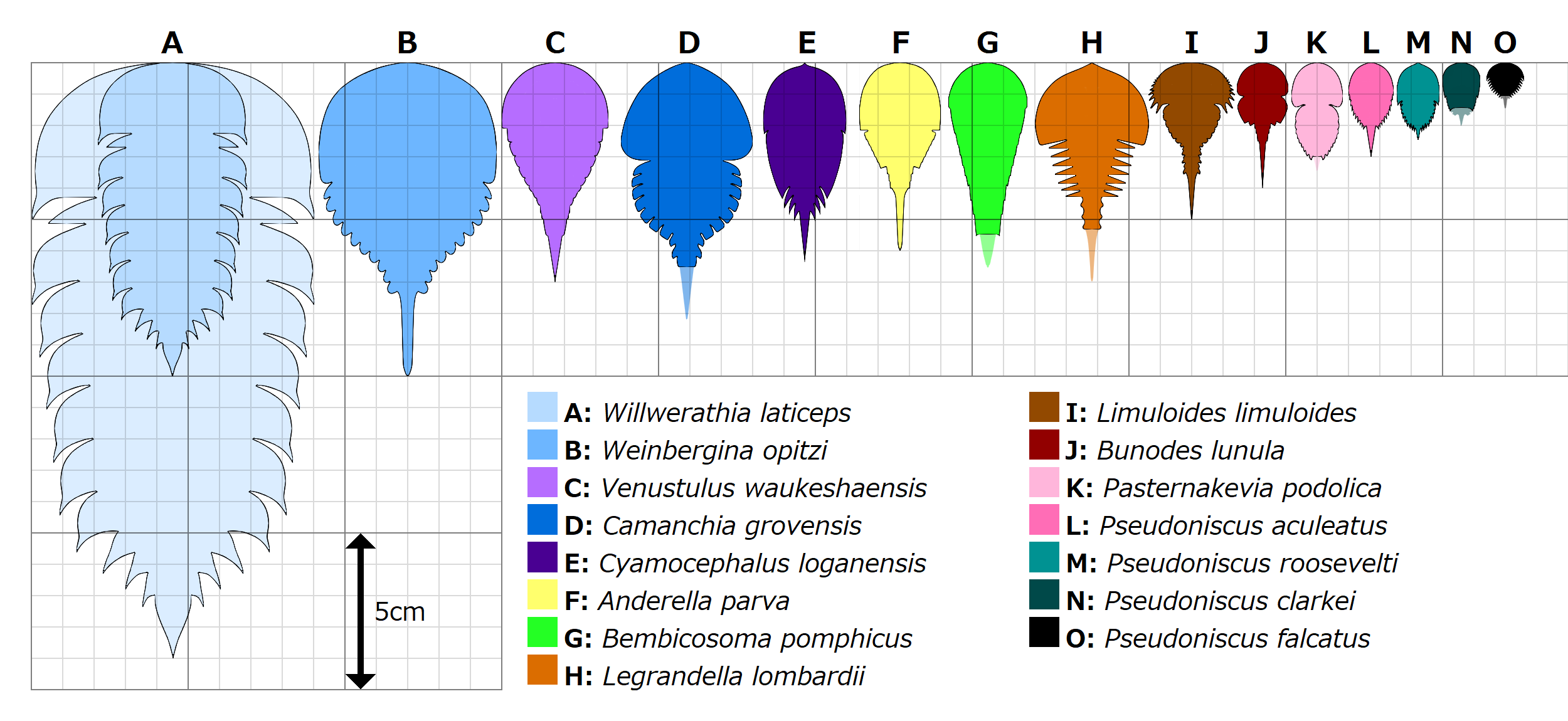
Size comparison of Willwerathia (A) and other synziphosurines.

As a synziphosurine, Willwerathia is unusually large and so far the largest known synziphosurine, with largest carapace measured about 90mm in width. Prosoma of Willwerathia covered by a vaulted carapace with pointed genal spines, recurved (M-shaped) ophthalmic ridges and pairs of dorsal nodes. Tergites of the opisthosoma are either incomplete or disarticulated in available fossil materials, making it difficult to reveal the original number of opisthosomal segments. The opisthosoma of Willwerathia most likely compose of 10 segments, each expressed by a tergite that bore a median dorsal spine and a pair of tergopleurae (lateral extensions). The opisthosoma subdivided into a wider, most likely 7-segmented preabdomen and a narrower, 3-segmented postabdomen. tergite of the first opisthosomal segment is reduced in length while the remaining segments possess well-developed tergites with lateral nodes and posteriorly curved tergopleurae. The final segment terminated with a short, teardrop-shaped telson.

== Paleoecology ==
Willwerathia was most likely a bottom-dwelling predator. The marked articulation surfaces on each of the preabdominal segments suggest that Willwerathia capable to enroll itself in a way similar to Legrandella. The environment in which Wilwerathia lived in was likely an estuarine to deltaic one, and other animals like the largest eurypterid, Jaekelopterus, are known from the same formation.

== Classification ==
Falcatamacaris

Willwerathia was originally thought to be an eurypterid (sea scorpion), with additional fossils described in 1998 reveal its synziphosurine affinities. In the redescription done by Anderson et al. 1998, Willwerathia had been grouped under the synziphosurine family Weinberginidae alongside Weinbergina and Legrandella, a classification which is not supported by phylogenetic analysis. Willwerathia was regarded as part of the monophyletic Xiphosura sensu stricto (true horseshoe crab) by Lamsdell 2013, but further phylogenetic analysis repeatedly resolving it within a clade compose of Bunodids, Pseudoniscids and Dekatriatan (chasmataspidids, eurypterids and arachnids). Morphology of Silurian-Devonian arthropd Maldybulakia is sometimes compared to that of Willwerathia. However, in 2020, Lamsdell found that Willwerathia bears a strong resemblance to the Cambrian artiopod Falcatamacaris, while it does not bear resemblance to other chelicerates.
