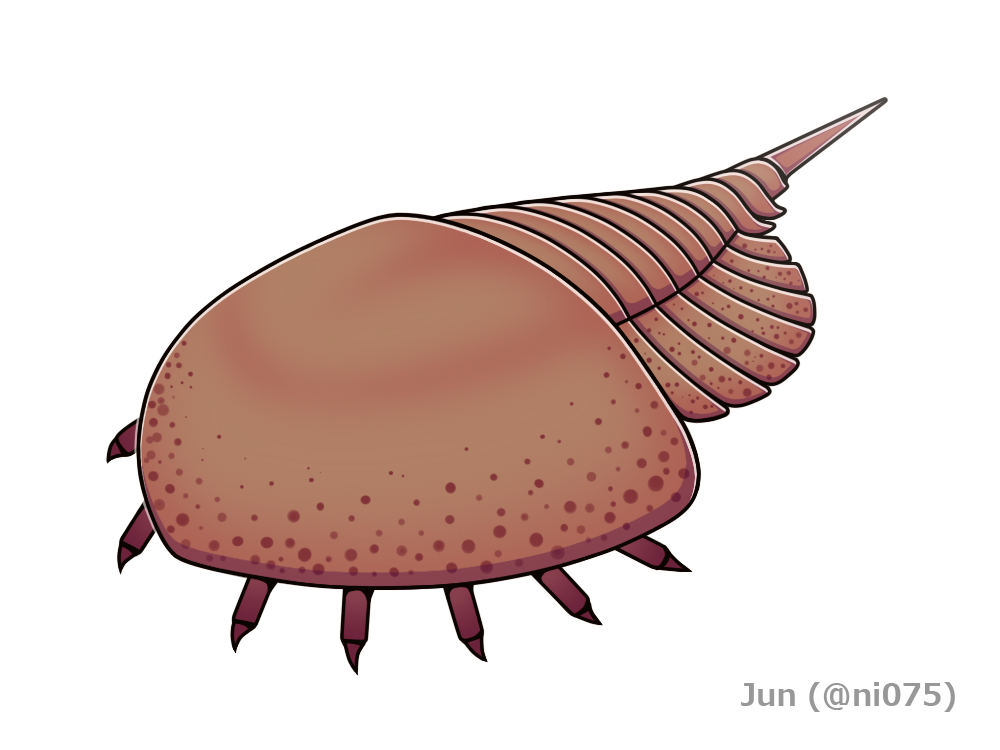
- Reconstruction of Camanchia grovensis

Scientific classification
- Kingdom: Animalia
- Phylum: Arthropoda
- Subphylum: Chelicerata
- Clade: Euchelicerata
- Clade: Prosomapoda
- Genus: †Camanchia; Moore et al., 2011

Type species
- †Camanchia grovensis Moore et al., 2011

= Camanchia =

Camanchia Temporal range: Silurian

Extinct genus of arthropods

Camanchia is a genus of synziphosurine, a paraphyletic group of fossil chelicerate arthropods. Camanchia was regarded as part of the clade Prosomapoda. Fossils of the single and type species, C. grovensis, have been discovered in deposits of the Silurian period in Iowa, in the United States. Alongside Venustulus, Camanchia is one of the only Silurian synziphosurine with fossil showing evidence of appendages.

The prosoma of Camanchia covered by a smoothly curved subtriangular carapace with broad doublure (ventral thickening run through the margin of carapace). Detail of the 6 prosomal appendage pairs (chelicerae+5 leg pairs) obscure, at least the first leg pair (appendage II) have spur-like terminations. Opisthosoma is externally 10-segmented with tergites possess blunt pleurae (lateral extension). The last 3 opisthosomal segments forming a narrow postabdomen with short pleurae. Telson is yet to be discovered. The carapace margin and pleurae possess tubercles.
