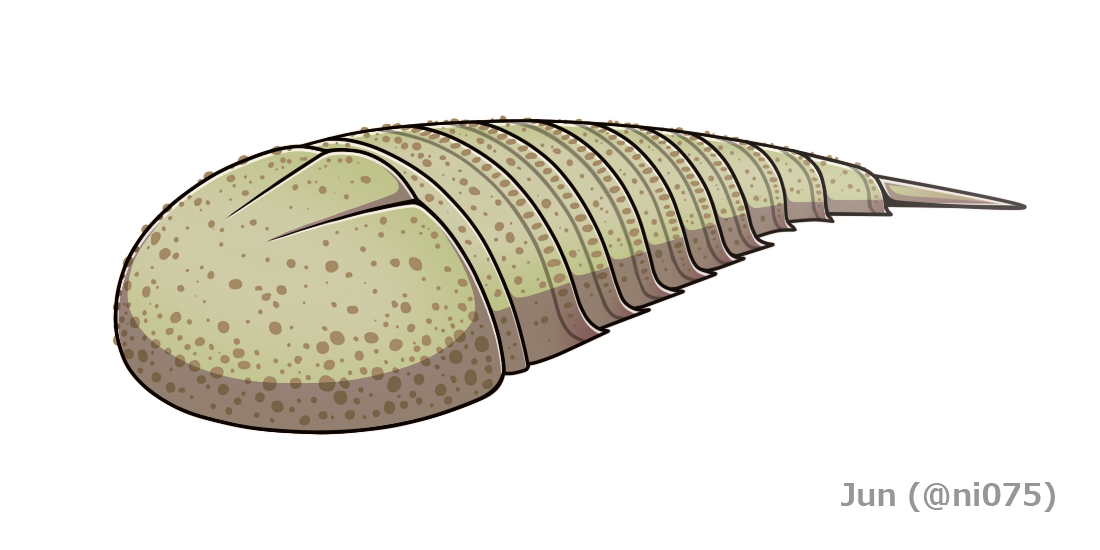
- Reconstruction of Bembicosoma pomphicus

Scientific classification
- Kingdom: Animalia
- Phylum: Arthropoda
- Subphylum: Chelicerata
- Clade: Prosomapoda
- Clade: Planaterga
- Genus: †Bembicosoma; Laurie, 1899

Type species
- †Bembicosoma pomphicus Laurie, 1899

= Bembicosoma =

Bembicosoma Temporal range: Silurian

Extinct genus of chelicerate

Bembicosoma is a genus of synziphosurine, a paraphyletic group of fossil chelicerate arthropods. Bembicosoma was regarded as part of the clade Planaterga. Fossils of the single and type species, B. pomphicus, have been discovered in deposits of the Silurian period in the Pentland Hills, Scotland (in the United Kingdom). Bembicosoma had been tentatively assigned as an eurypterid (sea scorpion) before its synziphosurine affinities revealed.

The prosoma of Bembicosoma covered by a short, semicircular carapace without evidence of ophthalmic ridges. Within the 10-segmented opisthosoma, the first segment is nearly as wide as the carapace but reduced in length while the second segment is the largest. The dorsal surfaces of both prosoma and opisthosoma covered by numerous tubercules.
