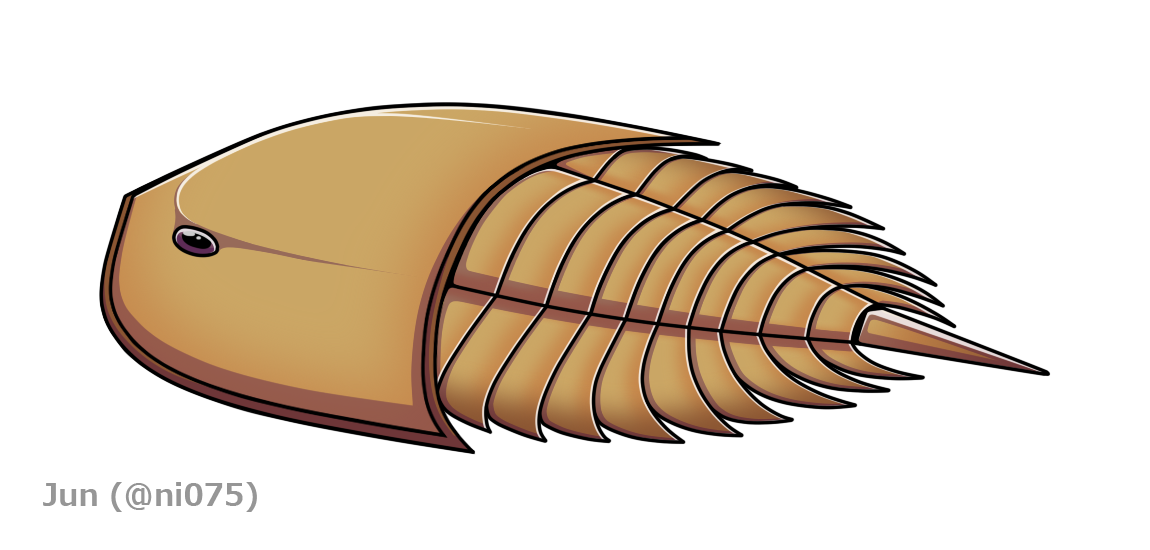
- Restoration of Pseudoniscus roosevelti

Scientific classification
- Kingdom: Animalia
- Phylum: Arthropoda
- Subphylum: Chelicerata
- Clade: Prosomapoda
- Clade: Planaterga
- Family: †Pseudoniscidae
- Genus: †Pseudoniscus; Nieszkowski, 1859

Type species
- †Pseudoniscus aculeatus Nieszkowski, 1859

Species
- †P. aculeatus Nieszkowski, 1859; †P. clarkei Ruedemann, 1916; †P. falcatus Woodward, 1868; †P. roosevelti Clarke, 1902

Synonyms
- Neolimulus Woodward, 1868

= Pseudoniscus =

Pseudoniscus Temporal range: Silurian

Extinct genus of chelicerate

Pseudoniscus is a genus of synziphosurine, a paraphyletic group of fossil chelicerate arthropods. Pseudoniscus was regarded as part of the clade Planaterga. Fossils of the genus have been discovered in deposits of the Silurian period in the United Kingdom (Patrick Burn Formation), the United States and Estonia. Pseudoniscus is one of the two members of the family Pseudoniscidae, the other being Cyamocephalus.

The prosoma of Pseudoniscus covered by a carapace with recurved posterior margin and pointed genal spines. Most of the dorsal features on the carapace (e.g. ophthalmic ridges, cardiac lobe) are not significantly expressed. At least some species have a median spine in front of the carapace like the close-related Cyamocephalus. Unlike most other synziphosurines with opisthosoma subdivided into a wide preabdomen and narrow postabdomen, the 10-segmented opisthosoma of Pseudoniscus possess undivided, metameric segmentation similar to Pasternakevia. Within Pseudoniscus, P. roosevelti is one of the few synziphosurines that confirmed to have lateral compound eyes, while the remaining species lacking unambiguous evidence of it.
