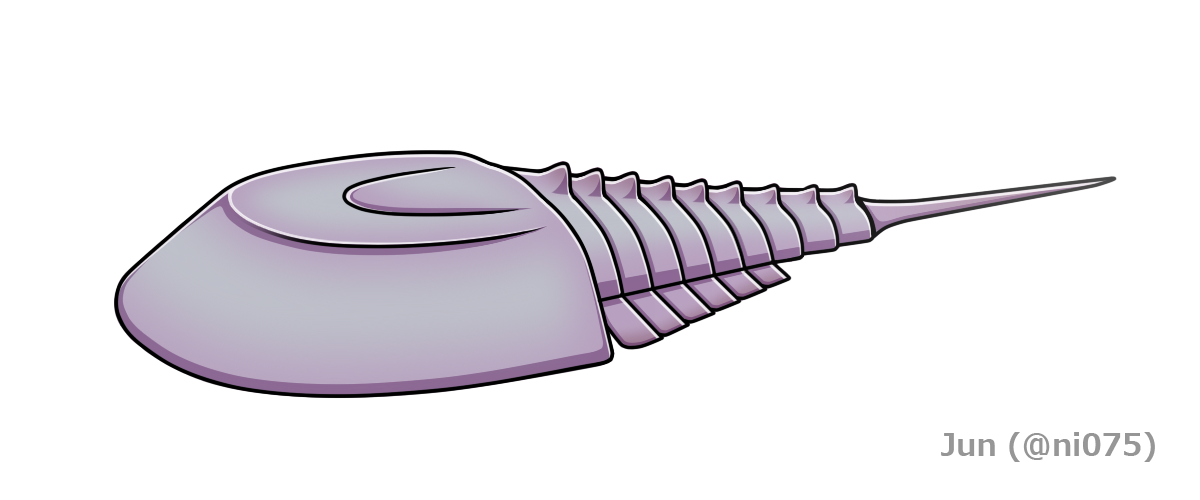
- Reconstruction of Anderella parva

Scientific classification
- Kingdom: Animalia
- Phylum: Arthropoda
- Subphylum: Chelicerata
- Clade: Euchelicerata
- Clade: Prosomapoda (?)
- Genus: †Anderella; Moore, McKenzie & Lieberman, 2007

Type species
- †Anderella parva Moore, McKenzie & Lieberman, 2007

= Anderella =

Anderella Temporal range: Mississippian

Extinct genus of chelicerate

Anderella is a genus of synziphosurine, a paraphyletic group of fossil chelicerate arthropods. Anderella was regarded as part of the clade Prosomapoda. Fossils of the single and type species, A. parva, have been discovered in deposits of the Carboniferous period in Montana, in the United States. Anderella is the first and so far (as of 2020) the only Carboniferous synziphosurine being described, making it the youngest member of synziphosurines. Anderella is also one of the few synziphosurine genera with fossil showing evidence of appendages, but the details are obscure due to their poor preservation.

The prosoma of Anderella possess a suboval carapace slightly longer than the externally 10-segmented opisthosoma (excluding telson). A row of axial nodes run through the opisthosomal tergites. The last 3 opisthosomal segments (which forming the postabdomen) are longer and lacking pleurae (lateral extensions).
