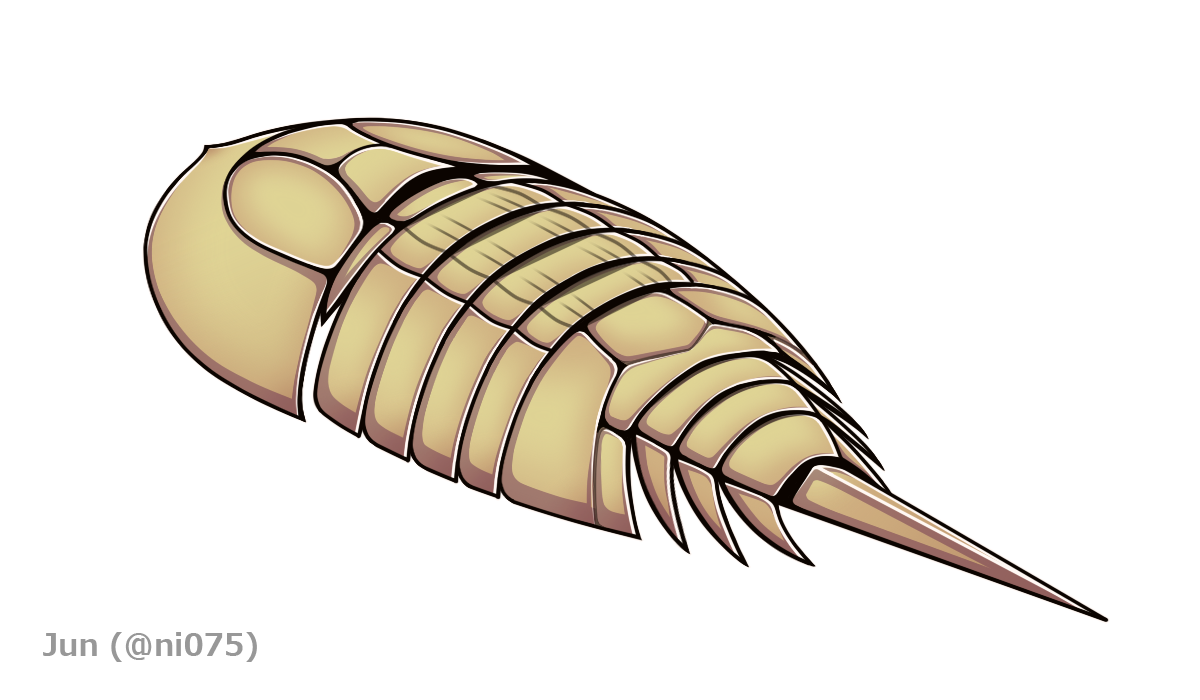
- Reconstruction of Cyamocephalus loganensis

Scientific classification
- Kingdom: Animalia
- Phylum: Arthropoda
- Subphylum: Chelicerata
- Clade: Prosomapoda
- Clade: Planaterga
- Family: †Pseudoniscidae
- Genus: †Cyamocephalus; Currie, 1927

Type species
- †Cyamocephalus loganensis Currie, 1927

= Cyamocephalus =

Cyamocephalus Temporal range: Silurian

Extinct genus of chelicerate

Cyamocephalus is a genus of synziphosurine, a paraphyletic group of fossil chelicerate arthropods. Cyamocephalus was regarded as part of the clade Planaterga. Fossils of the single and type species, C. loganensis, have been discovered in deposits of the Silurian-aged Patrick Burn Formation in Lesmahagow, Scotland (in the United Kingdom). Cyamocephalus is one of the two members of the family Pseudoniscidae, the other being Pseudoniscus. Cyamocephalus differ from Pseudoniscus by the fused tergites of 6th and 7th opisthosomal segments.
