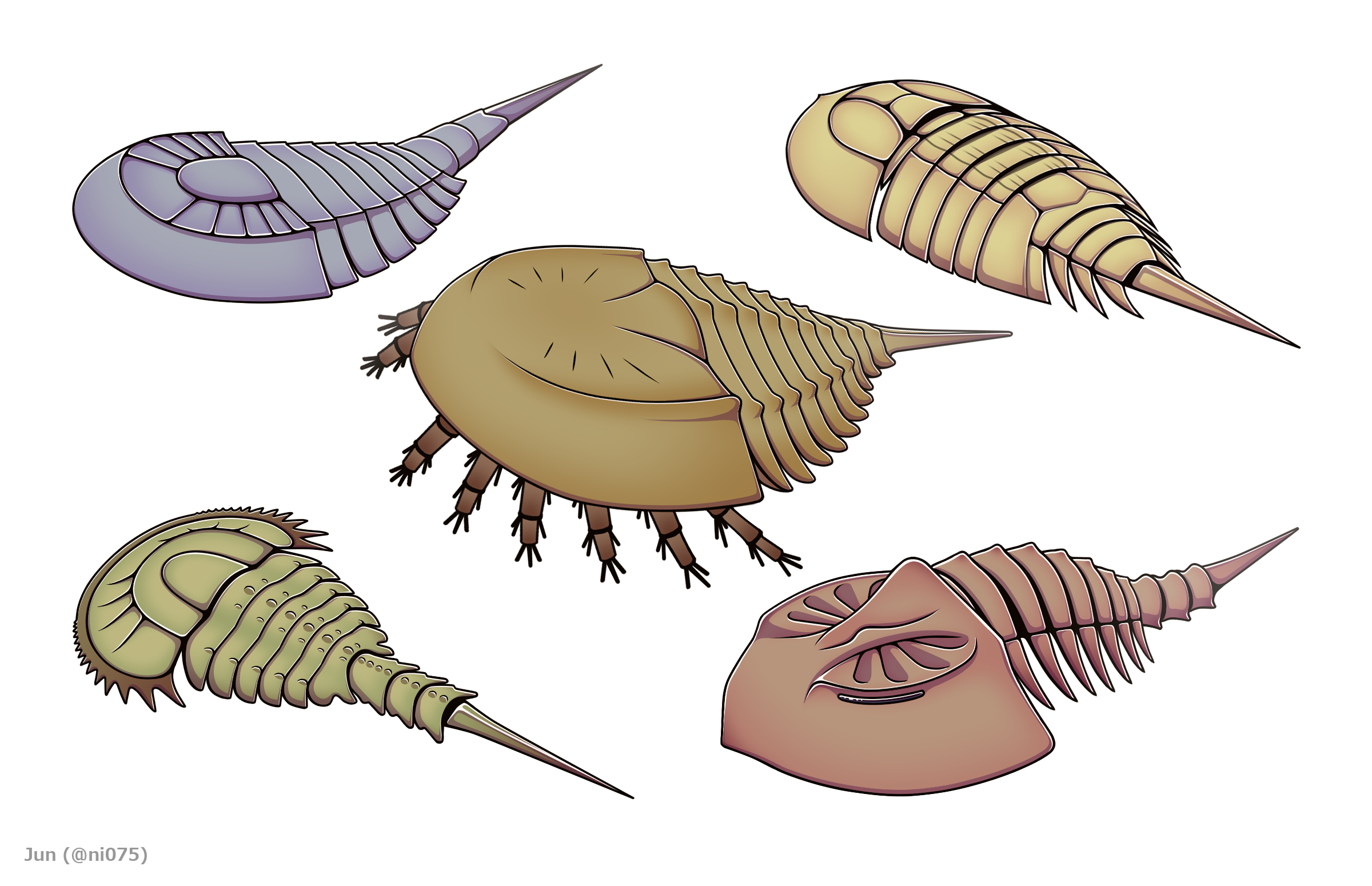
- Venustulus waukeshaensis (top left), Cyamocephalus loganensis (top right), Weinbergina opitzi (center), Limuloides limuloides (bottom left), and Legrandella lombardii (bottom right).

Scientific classification
- Kingdom: Animalia
- Phylum: Arthropoda
- Subphylum: Chelicerata
- Clade: Euchelicerata
- Suborder: †Synziphosurina; Packard 1886

Genera
- Anderella; Bembicosoma; Bunaia; Bunodes; Camanchia; Cyamocephalus; Legrandella; Limuloides; Pasternakevia; Pseudoniscus; Smotrychaspis; Venustulus; Weinbergina; Willwerathia

= Synziphosurina =

Synziphosurina Temporal range: Jiangshanian–Mississippian

Group of arthropods

Synziphosurina is a paraphyletic group of chelicerate arthropods previously thought to be basal horseshoe crabs (Xiphosura). It was later identified as a grade composed of various basal euchelicerates, eventually excluded from the monophyletic Xiphosura sensu stricto and only regarded as horseshoe crabs under a broader sense ('Xiphosura' sensu lato). Synziphosurines survived at least since early Ordovician to early Carboniferous in ages, with most species are known from the in-between Silurian strata.

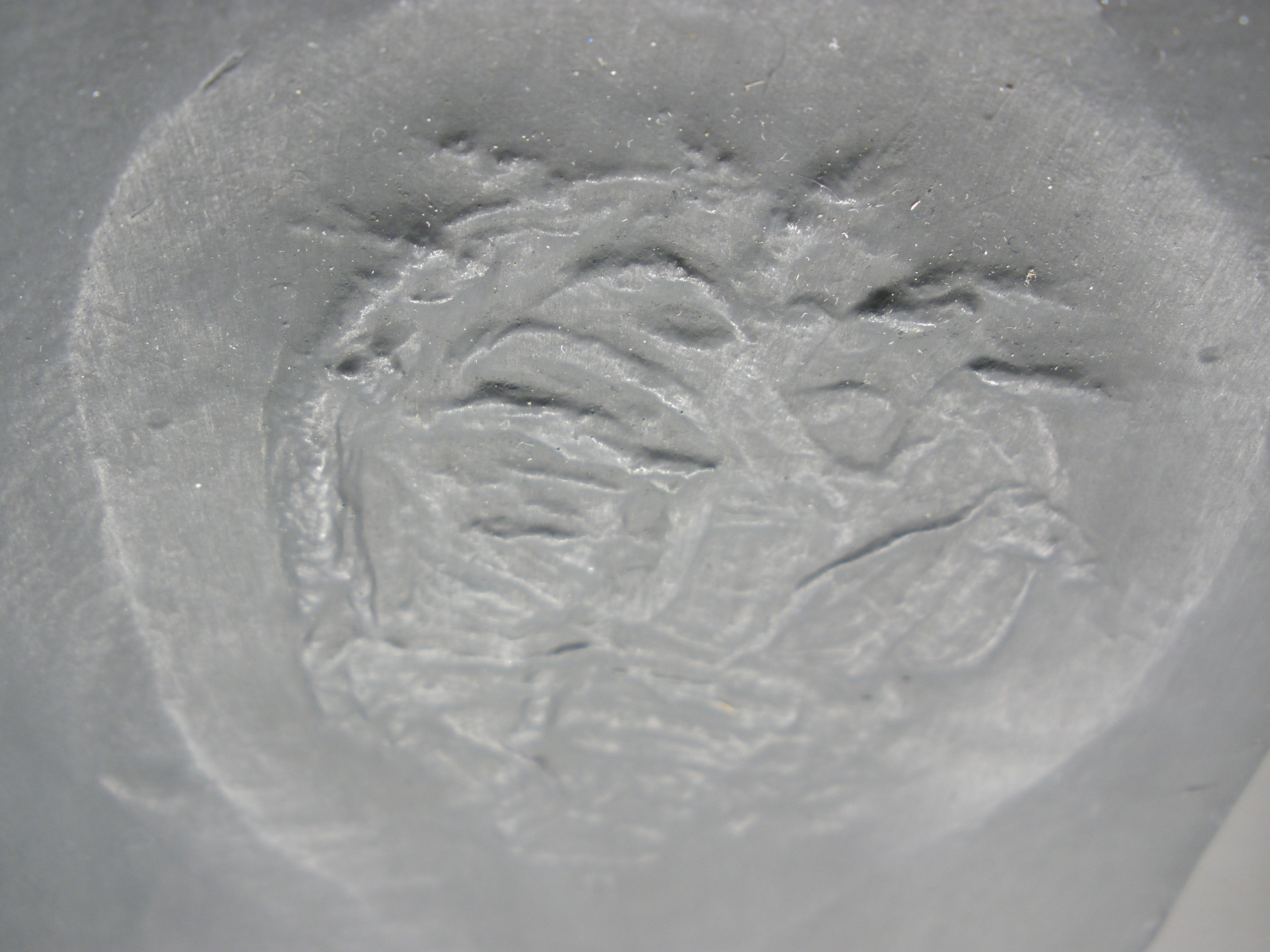
Fossil of Weinbergina opitzi with preserved ventral appendages.

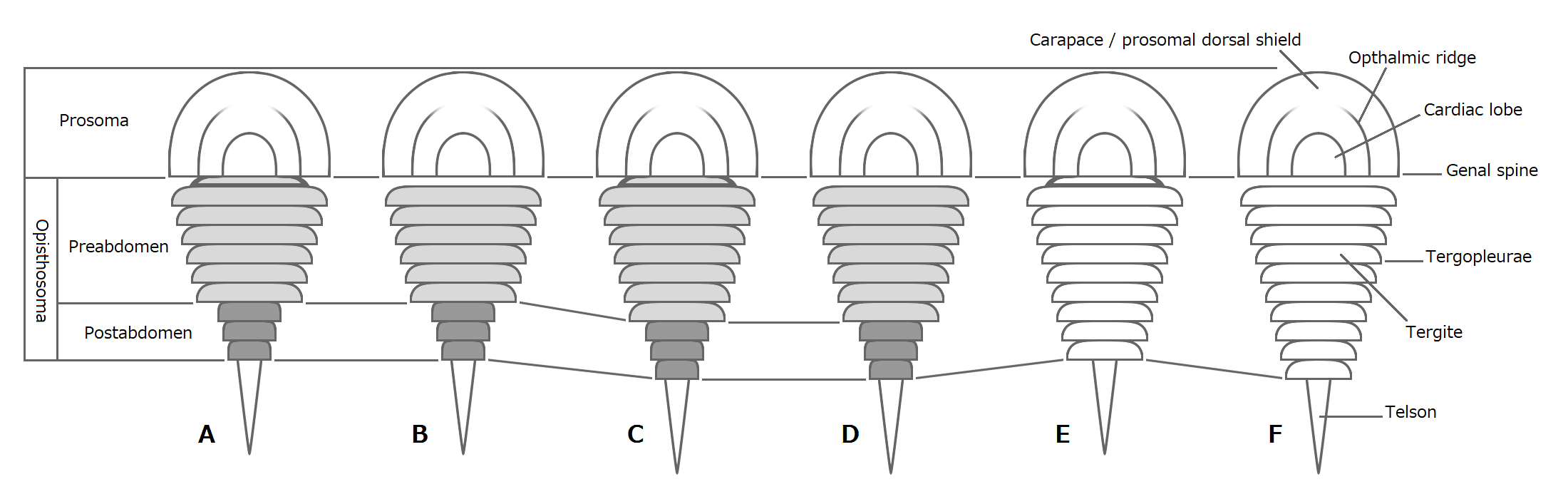
Dorsal morphology and variation of opisthosomal segmentation across synziphosurines.

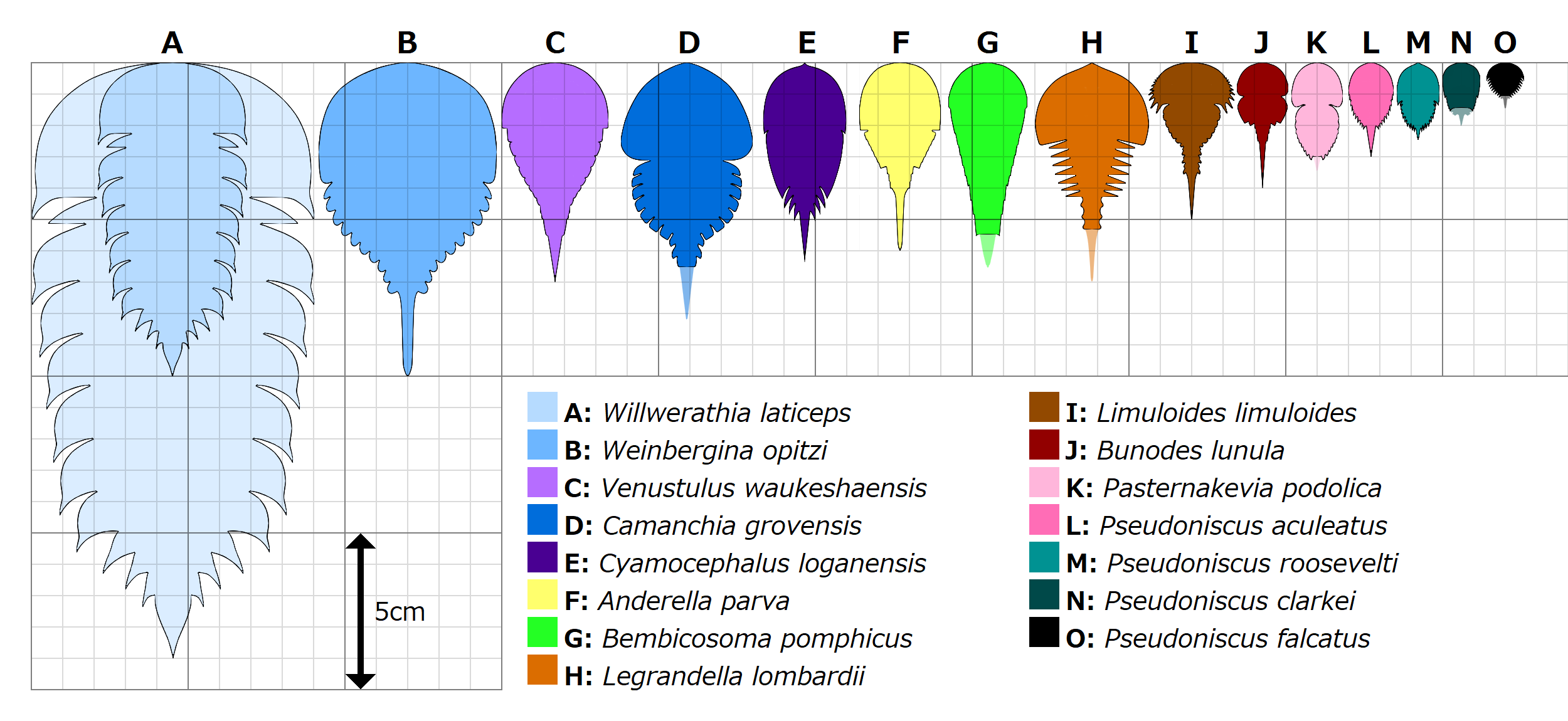
Size comparison of various synziphosurines.

While Weinbergina and Willwerathia being exceptionally large, most synziphosurines are small arthropods with body length ranging only about a few centimeters long.

The body of synziphosurine composed of a prosoma covered by a dome-like carapace (prosomal dorsal shield) and an opisthosoma with usually unfused 9-11 segments expressed by tergites. With the exception of Pseudoniscus and Pasternakevia, the last 3 opisthosomal segments precede the spine-like telson are specialized into a narrow postabdomen (pretelson), while the remaining wider segments referred to as preabdomen. A reduced anteriormost tergite (microtergite) originated from the first opisthosomal segment is observable at least in some genera. Most synziphosurines are possibly blind, with only a few species showing possible (e.g. Weinbergina opitzi) or clear (e.g. Legrandella lombardii) evidences of lateral compound eyes on their carapaces. Evidences of appendages are scarce, fragmentary known from Anderella parva, Camanchia grovensis and Venustulus waukeshaensis while exceptionally well-documented in Weinbergina opitzi. The prosoma possess a pair of chelicerae and at least 5 pairs of walking legs while the opisthosoma probably has 6 pairs of plate-like opercula.

As of 2020, at least 13 genera and 20 species were considered to be synziphosurines. The even basal euchelicerates Offacolus and Dibasterium, the questionable genus Borchgrevinkium, as well as the Dekatriata-related Houia and Winneshiekia, may also regarded as members of synziphosurines in some literatures.
