= Falcatamacaris =

Falcatamacaris Temporal range: Cambrian Stage 3
- Outline of F. bellua, with telson based on specimen in private collection

Scientific classification
- Kingdom: Animalia
- Phylum: Arthropoda
- Clade: †Artiopoda
- Genus: †Falcatamacaris; Ortega-Hernández, Lerosey-Aubril, Kier & Bonino, 2014
- Species: †F. bellua

Binomial name
- †Falcatamacaris bellua Ortega-Hernández, Lerosey-Aubril, Kier & Bonino, 2014

Extinct genus of arthropods

Falcatamacaris is an extinct genus of Cambrian artiopodan arthropod, only known from the type species F. bellua described in 2014, from the Guzhangian (Cambrian Stage 3) aged Weeks Formation in Utah. The holotype specimen is over 10 cm long (not including the absent telson). The trunk consists of 11 tergites, with crescent shaped pleural spines. Its placement within the Artiopoda was unresolved.
