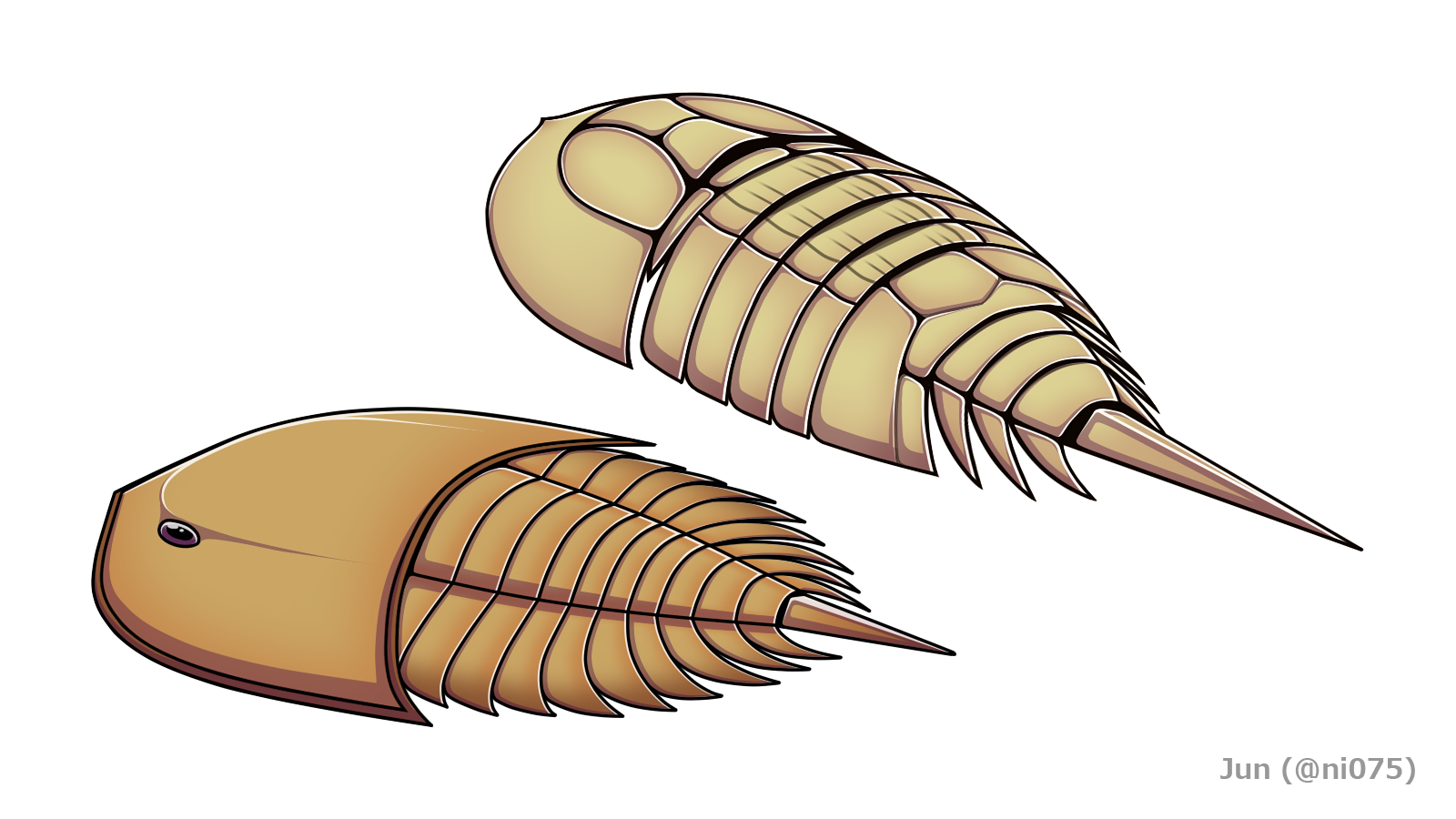
- Restoration of Pseudoniscus roosevelti and Cyamocephalus loganensis

Scientific classification
- Kingdom: Animalia
- Phylum: Arthropoda
- Subphylum: Chelicerata
- Clade: Prosomapoda
- Clade: Planaterga
- Family: †Pseudoniscidae; Packard, 1886

Type species
- †Pseudoniscus aculeatus Nieszkowski, 1859

Genera
- †Cyamocephalus; †Pseudoniscus

= Pseudoniscidae =

Pseudoniscidae Temporal range: Silurian

Extinct family of chelicerates

Pseudoniscidae is an extinct family of synziphosurine chelicerates that lived in the Silurian. Pseudoniscidae is classified inside the clade Planaterga, alongside Bunodidae and Dekatriata (chasmataspidids, eurypterids and arachnids). Pseudoniscidae is composed by two genera, Cyamocephalus and Pseudoniscus (the type genus).
