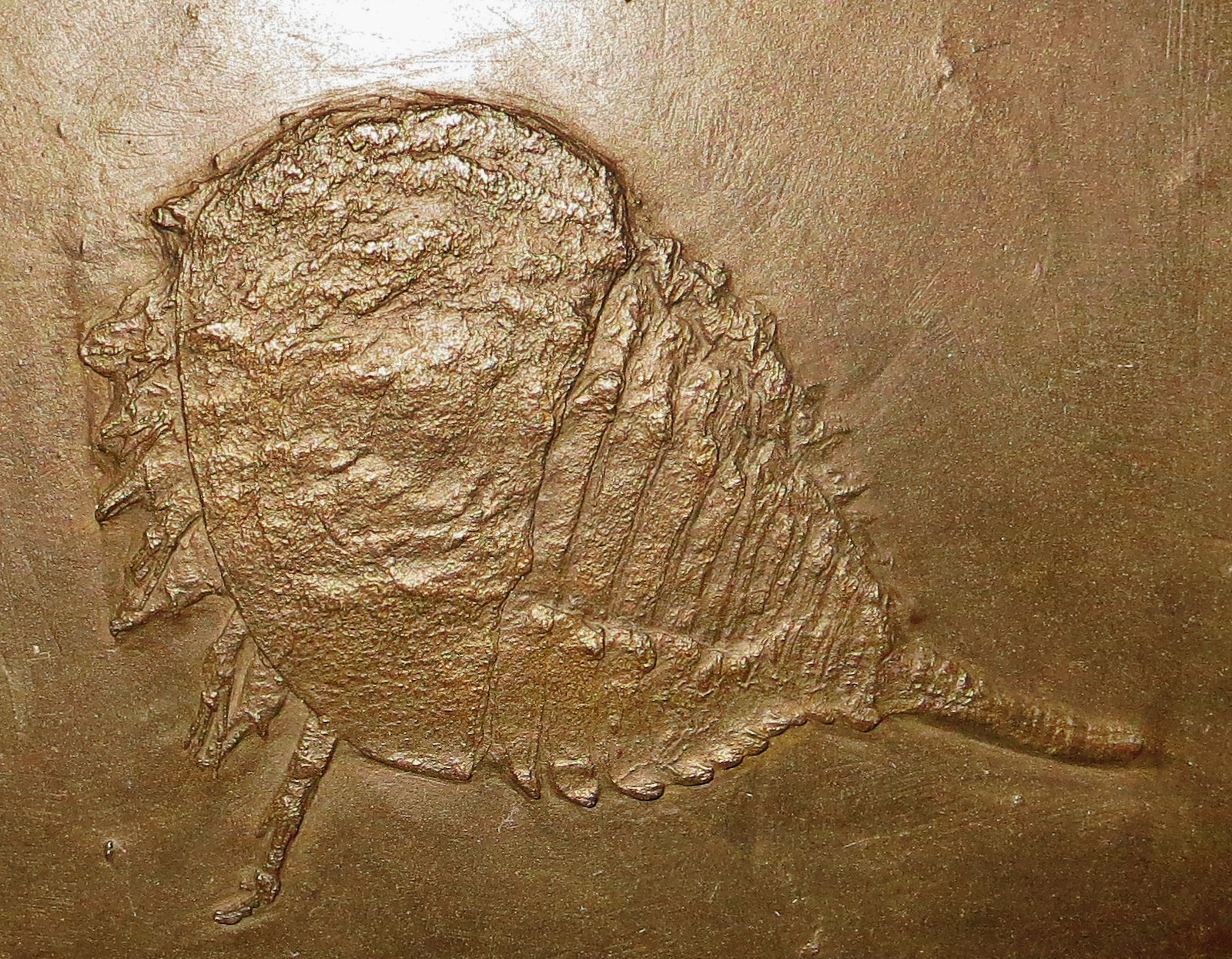
- Fossil of Weinbergina opitzi, Naturmuseum Senckenberg
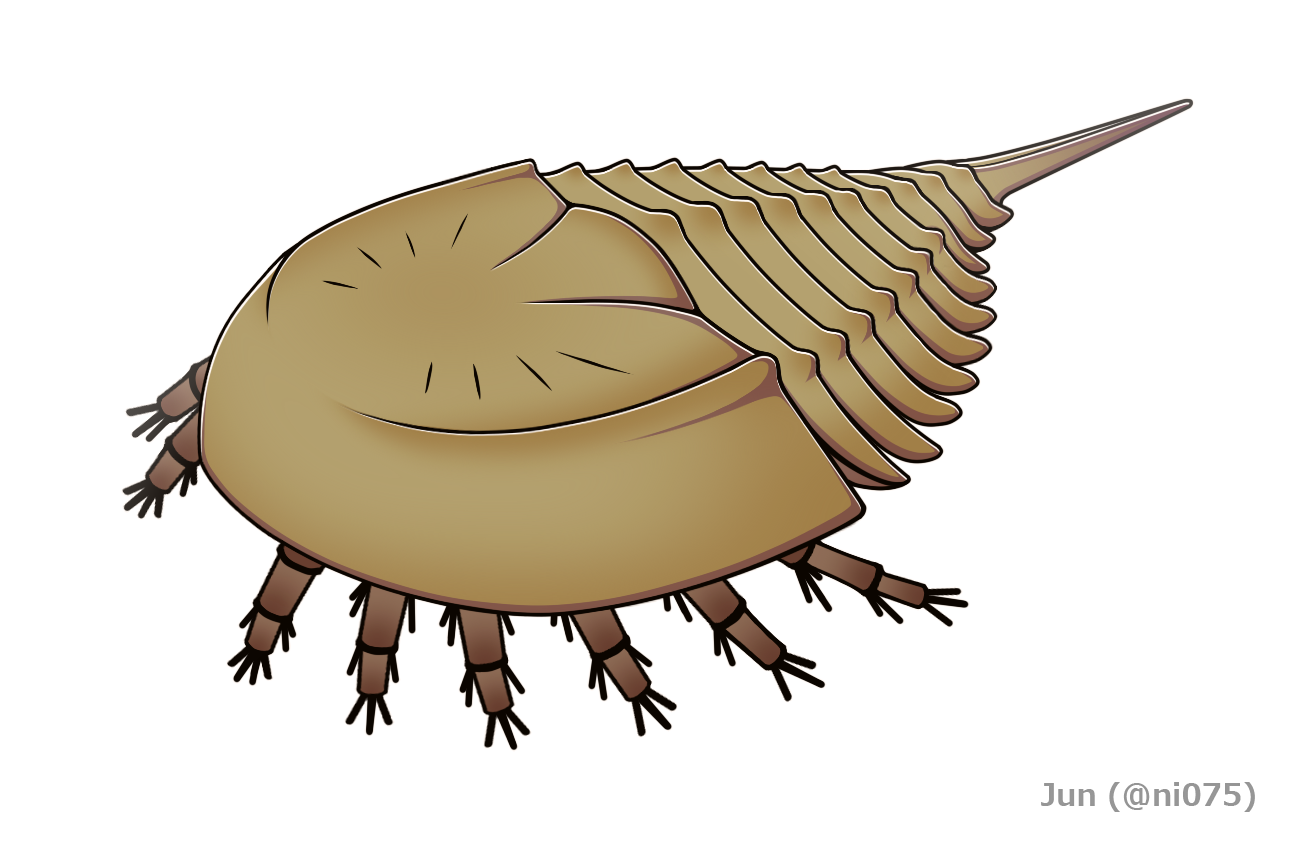
- Reconstruction

Scientific classification
- Kingdom: Animalia
- Phylum: Arthropoda
- Subphylum: Chelicerata
- Clade: Euchelicerata
- Genus: †Weinbergina; Richter & Richter, 1929

Type species
- †Weinbergina opitzi Richter & Richter, 1929

= Weinbergina =

Weinbergina Temporal range: latest Pragian to early Emsian 408–400 Ma

Extinct genus of chelicerate

Weinbergina is a genus of synziphosurine, a paraphyletic group of fossil chelicerate arthropods. Fossils of the single and type species, W. opitzi, have been discovered in deposits of the Devonian period in the Hunsrück Slate, Germany.

== Morphology ==
Weinbergina is a relatively large synziphosurine, ranging about 7 cm to 10 cm in full body length. The prosoma is covered by a semicircular carapace with blunt genal cornua (posterolateral corners). There is possible evidence of lateral eyes located just below the ophthalmic ridges. The opisthosoma is externally 10-segmented, expressed by tergites that possess blunt tergopleurae (lateral extension) and axial nodes. However, the opisthosoma is most likely 11-segmented in origin, with the first segment being highly reduced (a synapomorphy of euchelicerates) and possibly covered by the preceding carapace. The last 3 segments form a narrow postabdomen and lacking lateral nodes.

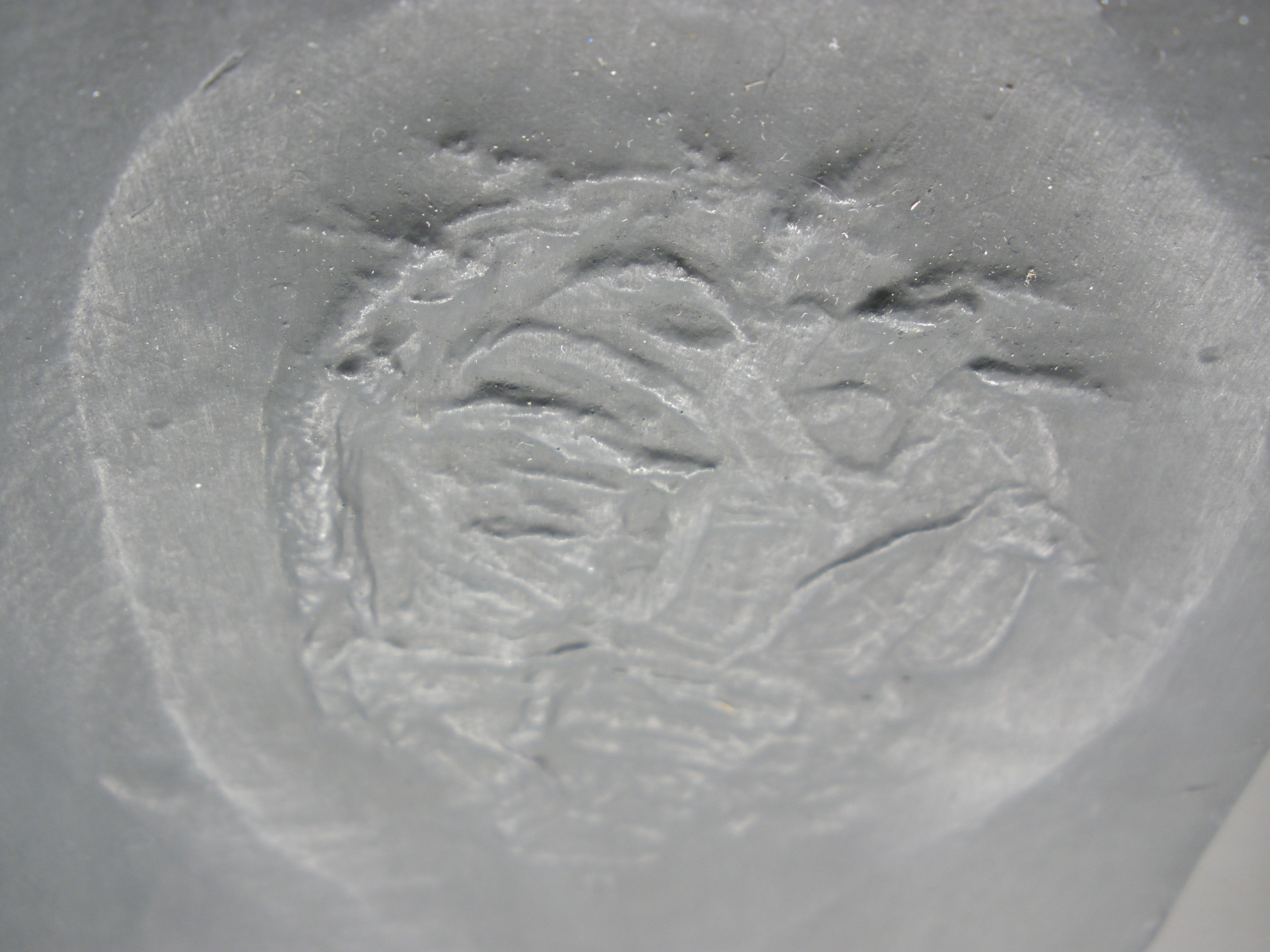
Fossil with preserved appendages

Compared to other synziphosurines with only scarce or no discovery of any evidence of appendages, the appendages of Weinbergina are exceptionally well-preserved in many described fossil materials. Underneath the carapace are small chelicerae and pairs of well-developed, 8-segmented walking legs. Each of the distal leg podomeres (segmental units) bore numerous spines-like projections, forming a snow-shoe-like termination. The opisthosoma possess (possibly 6) pairs of opercula with setose distal regions and possible evidence of book gills.

Based on the interpretation of Stürmer & Bergström (1981) and Moore, Briggs & Bartels (2005), Weinbergina is unusual in having 6 pairs of walking legs instead of 5 or less like those of other euchelicerates. The additional 6th leg pair was regarded to be originated from somite 7 (1st opisthosomal segment), thus homologous with the chilaria of horseshoe crab, metastoma of dekatriatan and 4th walking legs of sea spider. However, the twelve-legged interpretation is not universally accepted - for example, Weinbergina was originally described as ten-legged like extant horseshoe crab; Selden, Lamsdell & Qi (2015) noted that the structures previously identified as distal regions of walking legs may be in fact leg-like exopods like those of Offacolus and Dibasterium, while the actual terminations of walking legs (endopods) are chelate (pincer) like those of horseshoe crabs.

== Paleoecology ==
Weinbergina may have been a benthic animal with some degree of swimming ability, similar to modern horseshoe crabs. However, the lack of doublure (ventral thickening run through the margin of carapace) suggests that Weinbergina is not adapted for a sediment-dwelling lifestyle as seen in the modern horseshoe crab. Under the questionable 12-legged interpretation, the legs with snow-shoe-like terminations instead of chela are also more adapted for walking on fine-grained surface instead of searching food items beneath the sediment.

== Classification ==
With Weinbergina as type genus, Weinbergina, Legrandella and Willwerathia were once united under the single family Weinberginidae, an interpretation which is not recovered by later phylogenetic analysis. After the revision of relationship between synziphosurines and other euchelicerates done by Lamsdell 2013, Weinbergina was regarded as the basalmost member of Prosomapoda, a clade that included all euchelicerates except Offacolus and Dibasterium.
