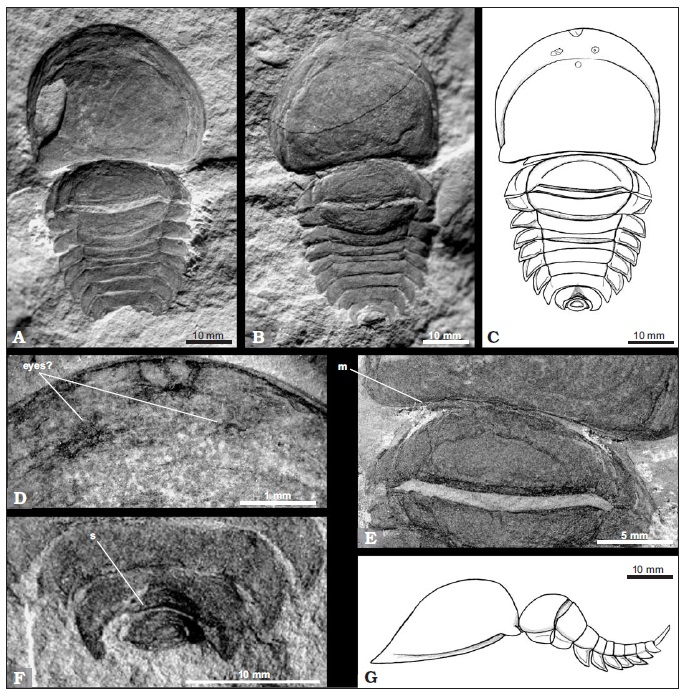
- Fossils and illustrations of P. podolica

Scientific classification
- Kingdom: Animalia
- Phylum: Arthropoda
- Subphylum: Chelicerata
- Clade: Prosomapoda
- Clade: Planaterga
- Genus: †Pasternakevia; Selden & Drygant, 1987

Type species
- †Pasternakevia podolica Selden & Drygant, 1987

= Pasternakevia =

Pasternakevia Temporal range: Ludlow

Extinct genus of chelicerate

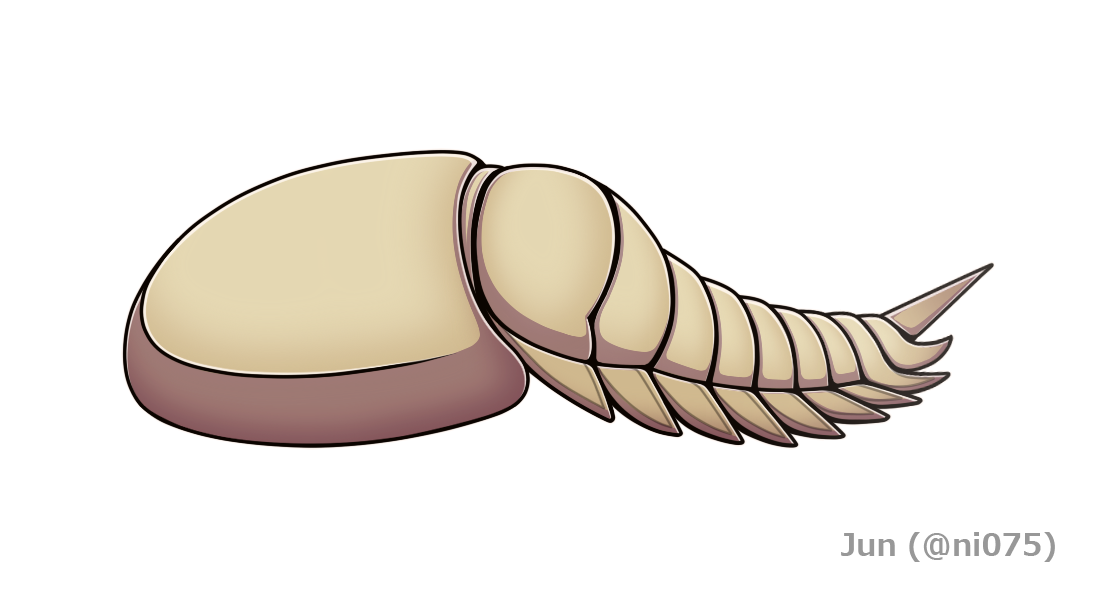
Reconstruction of Pasternakevia podolica

Pasternakevia is a genus of synziphosurine, a paraphyletic group of fossil chelicerate arthropods. Pasternakevia was regarded as part of the clade Planaterga. Fossils of the single and type species, P. podolica, have been discovered in deposits of the Silurian period in Podolia, Ukraine.

The prosoma of Pasternakevia covered by a smooth, semicircular carapace with rounded genal cornua (posterolateral corner of carapace). Within the 10-segmented opisthosoma, tergite of the first segment is reduced and usually hidden under the preceding carapace, while the second one is significantly arched and well-developed. All but the first tergite possess well-developed pleurae (lateral extension). A complete telson is yet to be discovered.
