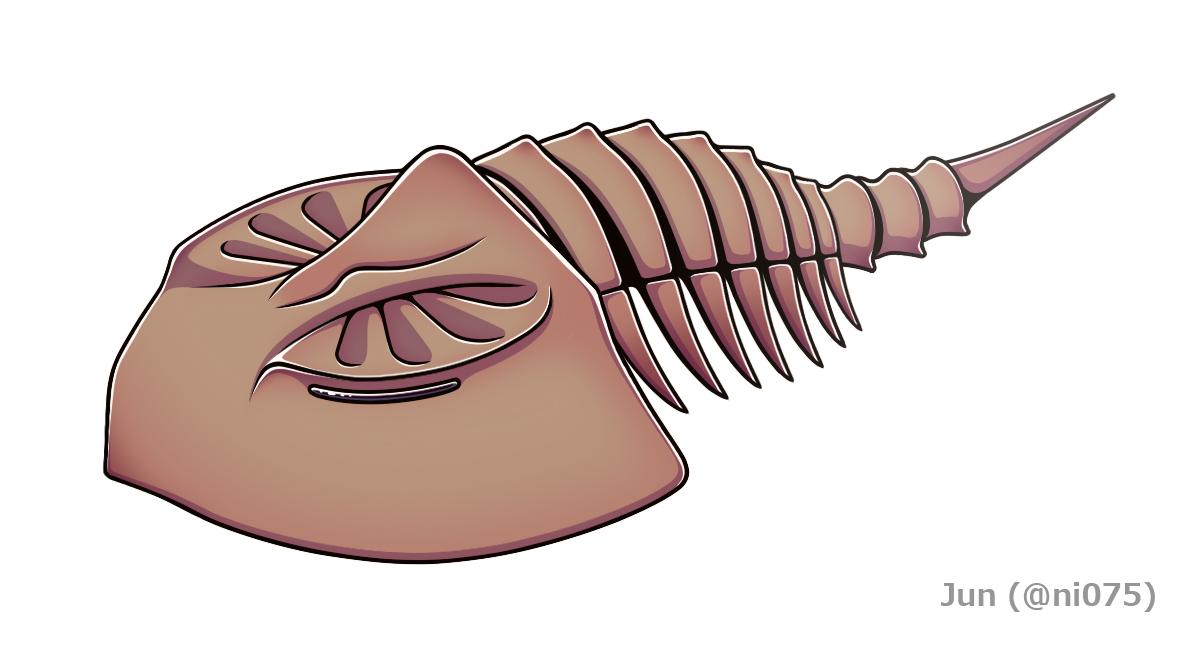
- Reconstruction of Legrandella lombardii
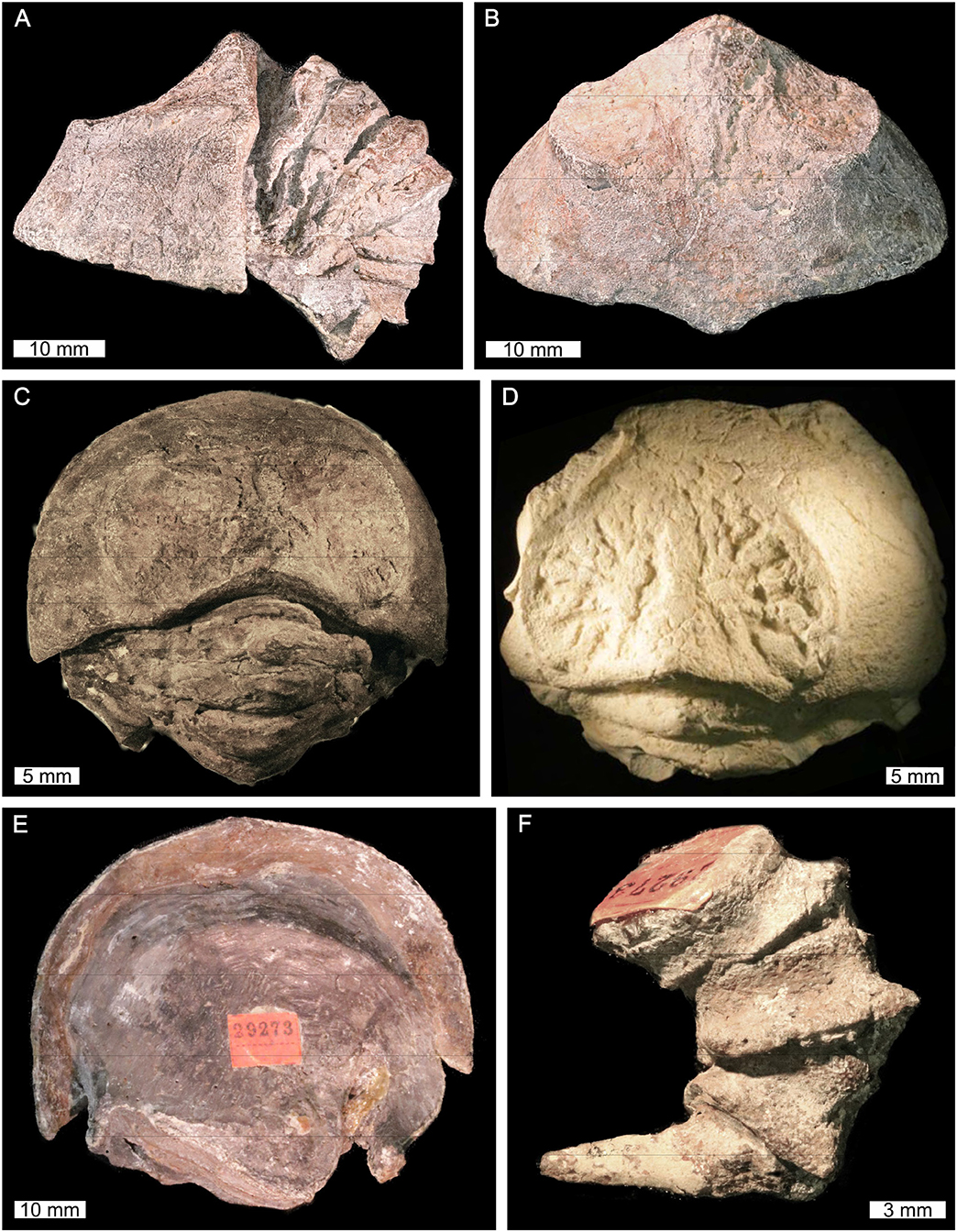
- Fossils of L. lombardii, holotype (A–C, E, F) and plastoparatype (D)

Scientific classification
- Kingdom: Animalia
- Phylum: Arthropoda
- Subphylum: Chelicerata
- Clade: Euchelicerata
- Clade: Prosomapoda
- Genus: †Legrandella; Eldredge, 1974

Type species
- †Legrandella lombardii Eldredge, 1974

= Legrandella =

Legrandella Temporal range: Devonian

Extinct genus of chelicerate

Legrandella is a genus of synziphosurine, a paraphyletic group of fossil chelicerate arthropods. Legrandella was regarded as part of the clade Prosomapoda. Fossils of the single and type species, L. lombardii, have been discovered in deposits of the Devonian period in Cochabamba, Bolivia.

The prosoma of Legrandella covered by a vaulted carapace with anterior projection, blunt genal cornua (posterolateral corners), humped cardiac lobe and pairs of radiated grooves. Alongside Pseudoniscus roosevelti, Legrandella lombardii is one of the few synziphosurine species that confirmed to have lateral compound eyes. The eyes are slit-like, located just below the ophthalmic ridges on each side of the carapace. The opisthosoma is externally 11-segmented, subdivided into a 8-segmented preabdomen and 3-segmented postabdomen. Tergite of the 1st preabdomimal segment is a reduced microtergite while the remaining 7 tergite possess axial nodes and spine-like tergopleurae (lateral extension). each of the postabdominal segment is cylindrical and bore reduced tergopleurae. The telson is triangular in cross section, but the distal region is yet to be discovered.
