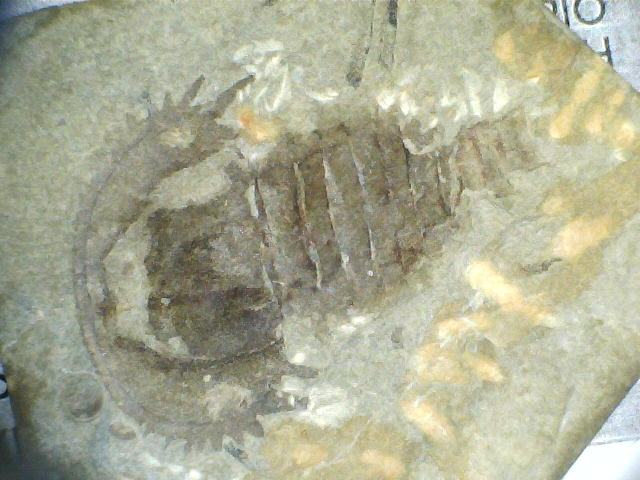
- Fossil of Limuloides limuloides, a bunodid
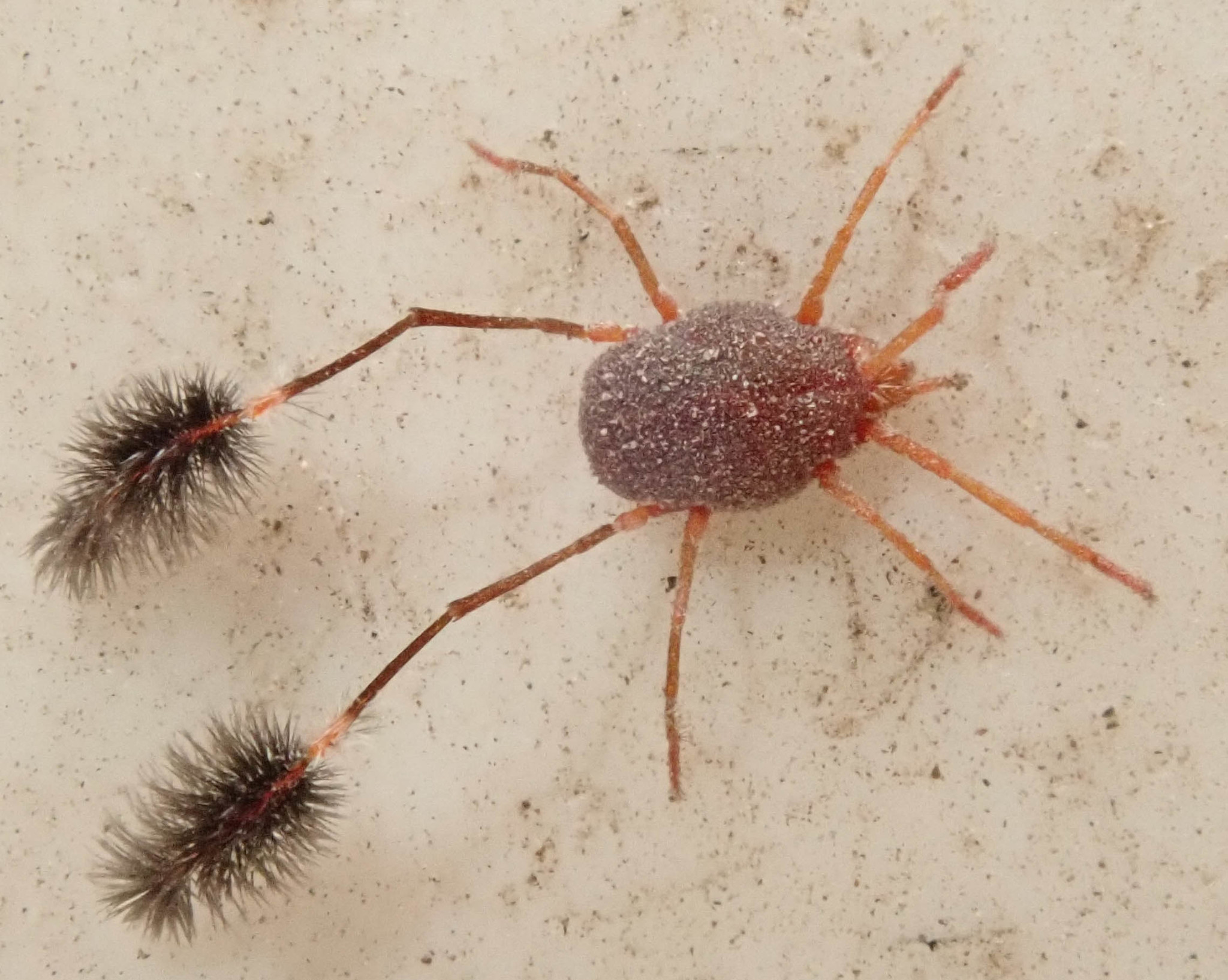
- Eatoniana namaquensis, a mite arachnid

Scientific classification
- Domain: Eukaryota
- Kingdom: Animalia
- Phylum: Arthropoda
- Subphylum: Chelicerata
- Clade: Prosomapoda
- Clade: Planaterga; Lamsdell, 2013

Groups
- †Bembicosoma; †?Bunaia; †Pasternakevia; †Bunodidae; †Pseudoniscidae; Dekatriata

= Planaterga =

Planaterga Temporal range: Ordovician–Recent

Clade of arthropods

Planaterga is a clade of prosomapod euchelicerates including several synziphosurid genera (mainly bunodids and pseudoniscids) and the group Dekatriata (which in turn includes arachnids, chasmataspidids and eurypterids). Planaterga is defined by the opisthosoma with tergites broadest at third or fourth and lacking enlarged axial nodes, carapace (prosomal dorsal shield) with reduced genal spines, as well as somite VII (first opisthosomal segment) with reduced appendages and microtergite.
