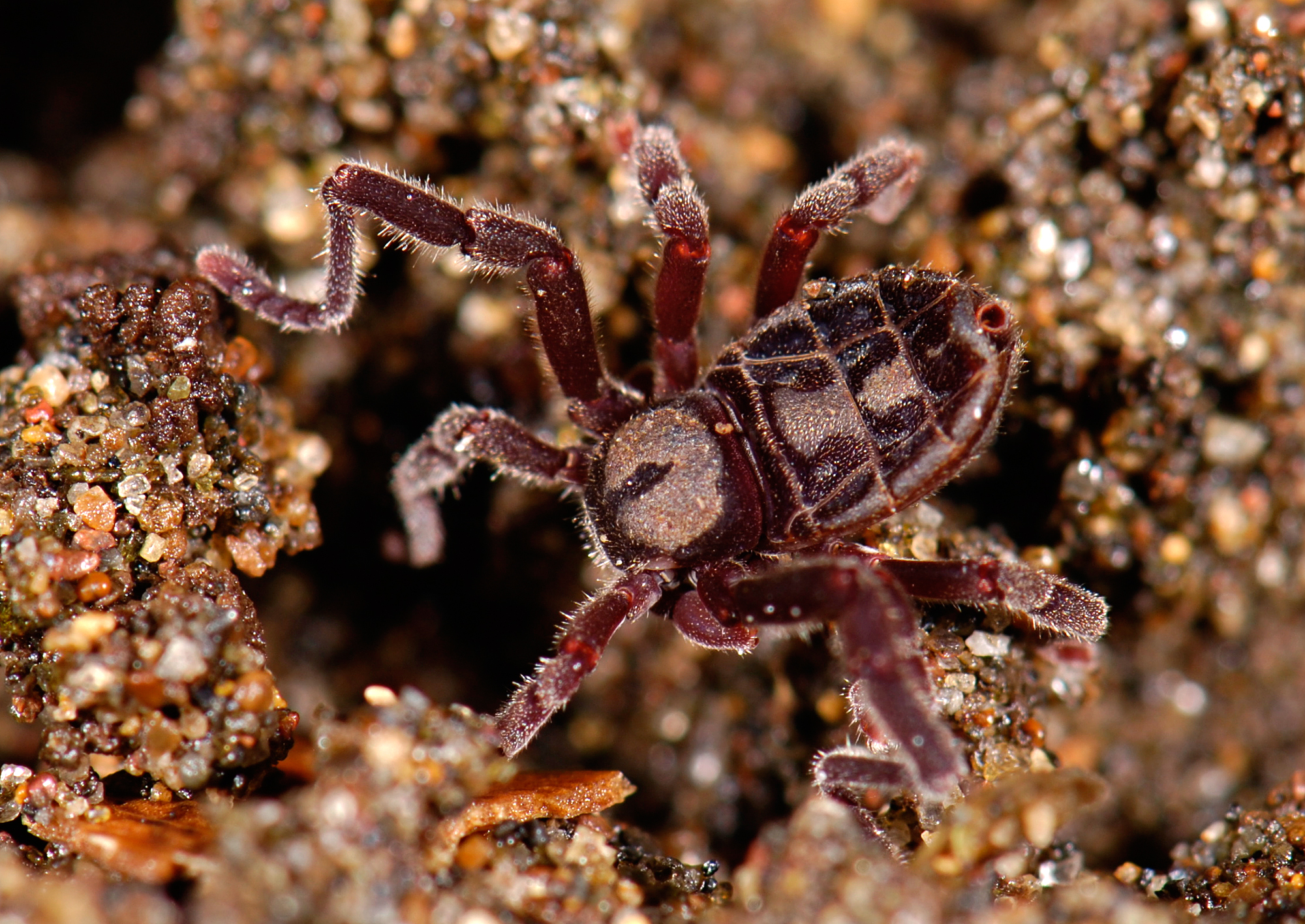
- Cryptocellus goodnighti, a ricinuleid arachnid

Scientific classification
- Domain: Eukaryota
- Kingdom: Animalia
- Phylum: Arthropoda
- Subphylum: Chelicerata
- Clade: Euchelicerata
- Clade: Prosomapoda; Lamsdell, 2013

Groups
- †?Borchgrevinkium; †Synziphosurina; Planaterga; Xiphosura

= Prosomapoda =

Prosomapoda Temporal range: Ordovician–Recent

Clade of arthropods

Prosomapoda is a clade of euchelicerates including the groups Xiphosura (horseshoe crabs) and Planaterga (a group comprising bunodids, pseudoniscids, chasmataspidids, eurypterids and arachnids), as well as several basal synziphosurid genera. The clade is defined by the lack of exopods (outer branches) of prosomal appendage II-V in the adult instar, where in contrast the exopods of appendage II-V are well-developed in the non-prosomapod euchelicerates Offacolus and Dibasterium.
