= Corynexochina =

Corynexochina Temporal range: Cambrian series 2–Furongian

Scientific classification
- Domain: Eukaryota
- Kingdom: Animalia
- Phylum: Arthropoda
- Class: †Trilobita
- Order: †Corynexochida
- Suborder: †Corynexochina; Kobayashi, 1935

Families
- Chengkouiidae Zhu, 1980; Corynexochidae Angelin, 1854; Dinesidae Lermontova, 1940; Dolichometopidae Walcott, 1916; Dorypygidae Kobayashi, 1935; Edelsteinaspididae Hupé, 1953; Jakutidae Suvorova, 1950; Oryctocephalidae Beecher, 1897; Zacanthoididae Swinnerton, 1915

Corynexochina is a poorly understood subdivision of the trilobite order Corynexochida.

== Taxonomy ==
- Corynexochidae

Abakania, Acontheus, Bonnaspis, Chatiania, Clavigellus, Corynexochella, Corynexochina, Corynexochus, Eochatiana, Eocorynexochus, Hartshillia, Hartshillina, Milaspis, Miranella, Olinaspis, Sanaschtykgolia, Shivelicus, Trinia.

- Dinesidae

Amginoerbia, Botomella, Chakasskia, Chakasskiella, Compsocephalus, Densocephalus, Dilataspis, Dinesus, Erbia, Erbiella, Erbina, Erbiopsidella, Erbiopsis, Ghwaiella, Paraerbia, Piriforma, Pokrovskiella, Proerbia, Pseudoerbia, Pseudoerbiopsis, Rondocephalus, Tingyuania, Tollaspis, Tumulina.

- Dokimocephalidae

Acrocephalina, Alekcinella, Anemocephalus, Anuloides, Apachia, Bellaspidella, Bellaspis, Beothuckia, Burnetiella, Calocephalites, Chalfontia, Conaspis, Crusoiina, Deckera, Dellea, Delleana, Didwudina, Dokimocephalus, Fastigaspis, Glyptometopsis, Glyptometopus, Iddingsia, Jingxiania, Kindbladia, Kiowaia, Kyphocephalus, Lorrettina, Obrucheviaspis, Pinctus, Plakhinella, Pseudosaratogia, Puanella, Ritella, Saimachia, Sulcocephalus, Taenicephalina, Tatulaspis, Tchuostachia, Whittingtonella, Wilsonarella, Wuhuia, Yangweizhouia.

- Dolichometopidae

Aegunaspis, Amphoton, Anoria, Asperocare, Athabaskia, Athabaskiella, Atypicus, Basanellus, Bathyuriscidella, Bathyuriscus, Borovikovia, Centonella, Chilometopus, Chilonorria, Clavaspidella, Corynexochides, Deiradonyx, Dolicholeptus, Dolichometopsis, Dolichometopus, Drozdoviella, Erratobalticus, Ezhuangia, Fuchouia, Glossopleura, ?Granularaspis, Guraspis, ?Hanburia, Hemirhodon, Horonastes, Itydeois, Kannoriella, Klotziella, Lianhuashania, Mendospidella, Neopoliellina, Parapoliella, Poliella, Poliellaspidella, Poliellaspis, Poliellina, Politinella, Polypleuraspis, Prosymphysurus, Pseudamphoton, Ptannigania, Saimixiella, Sestrostega, Shanghaia, Sinijanella, Suvorovaaspis, Undillia, Zhenpingaspis.

- Dorypygidae

Atdabanella, Basocephalus, Bonnaria, Bonnia, Bonniella, Bonnima, Bonnioides, Bonniopsis, Dorypygaspis, Dorypyge, Dorypygina, Dorypygoides, Duyunia, Fordaspis, Hicksia, Holteria, Holyoakia, Jiuquania, Kharausnurica, Kootenia, Kooteniella, Kooteniellina, Kootenina, Liokootenia, Mengzia, Metakootenia, Namiolenoides, Neolenus, Ogygopsis, Olenoides, Paraolenoides, Popigaia, Prokootenia, Protypus, Pulvillaspis, Rabutina, Saryaspis, Shipaiella, Strettonia, Tabatopygellina, Tadjikia, Tienzhuia, Tolanaspis.

- Edelsteinaspididae

Alacephalus, Edelsteinaspis, Gelasene, Keeleaspis, Labradoria, Labradorina, Laticephalus, Litaspis, Nehanniaspis, Neoredlichina, Nodiceps, Paleofossus, Polliaxis, Torosus, Venosus.

- Jakutidae

Argasalina, Bathyuriscellus, Bathyuriscopsis, Daldynia, Gibscherella, Jakutus, Janshinicus, Jucundaspis, Judaiella, Kobdus, Lenaspis, Malykania, Manaspis, Prouktaspis, Uktaspis, Vologdinaspis.

- Oryctocephalidae

Arthricocephalus, Balangia, Barklyella, Cheiruroides, Curvoryctocephalus, Duodingia, Duyunaspis, Eoryctocephalus, Euarthricocephalus, Feilongshania, Haliplanktos, Hunanocephalus, Kunshanaspis, Lancastria, Metabalangia, Metarthricocephalus, Microryctocara, Neocheiruroides, Opsiosoryctocephalus, Oryctocara, Oryctocephalina, Oryctocephalites, Oryctocephaloides, Oryctocephalops, Oryctocephalus, Oryctometopus, Ovatoryctocara, Paleooryctocephalus, Parachangaspis, Paracheiruroides, Protoryctocephalus, Sandoveria, Shabaella, Taijiangocephalus, Teljanzella, Tonkinella, Udjanella.

- Zacanthoididae

Albertella, Albertellina, Albertelloides, Chuchiaspis, Danjiangella, Delamarina, Eozacanthoides, Fieldaspis, Mendogaspis, Mexicaspis, Micmaecopsis, Panxinella, Paralbertella, Parkaspis, Prozacanthoides, Pseudozacanthopsis, Ptarmiganoides, Qingzhenaspis, Stephenaspis, Thoracocare, Tianshanocephalus, Ursinella, Vanuxernella, Xuzhouia, Zacanthoides, Zacanthopsina, Zacanthopsis.
