= William Harold Fritz =

Geologist

William Harold Fritz (August 24, 1928 – June 9, 2009) was a geologist who worked for the Geological Survey of Canada. He is known for his work in stratigraphy and on olenelloid trilobites.

== Biography ==
Fritz was born in Cathlamet, Washington, where his father practised medicine for over 50 years. He graduated from Wahkiakum High School in 1946. After Air Force service during the Korean War, he completed his PhD in geology at the University of Washington in 1960. He first worked for the Shell Oil Company in Alaska, then in 1964 he moved to Canada taking up a position as a research geologist with the Geological Survey. After retiring he and his wife Judie carried out geological work in Nevada. They had one son, Peter.

== Geological work ==
Fritz's work focussed mostly on the Cambrian period. In 1966 and 1967 he, along with Judie and Peter as well as other geologists, spent two summers working on the Burgess Shale in the Canadian Rockies, discovered by Walcott in 1909. They found many soft-bodied fossils in the layers described by Walcott, expanding the existing collection, and also explored other sites in the area. Other early work, including that for his PhD, was carried out in the Great Basin, in Nevada. There was not much information available about the area of study, so much structural and stratigraphic surveying had to be done, as well as the analysis of the fossil material, largely trilobites. The work led to the identification of a number of new species of trilobites, of lower and middle Cambrian age, as well as two new genera

Most of Fritz's work was in the Canadian Cordillera, particularly in the Mackenzie Mountains. His interest in trilobites continued, and in 1972 he published a major taxonomic paper which identified three biostratigraphic zones in the lower Cambrian based on the characteristic trilobites they contain. These zones, Falotaspis, Nevadella and Bonnia-Olenellus are still in use. Fritz published many stratigraphic sections in north-western Canada, and several further taxonomic papers on trilobites

Fritz was a member of the Precambrian-Cambrian Boundary Working Group. As well as work in Canada this involved visits to China and to Siberia.

After his retirement he returned to his old surveying area of the Great Basin, and continued to search for trilobites, with considerable success.

== New trilobite genera erected ==
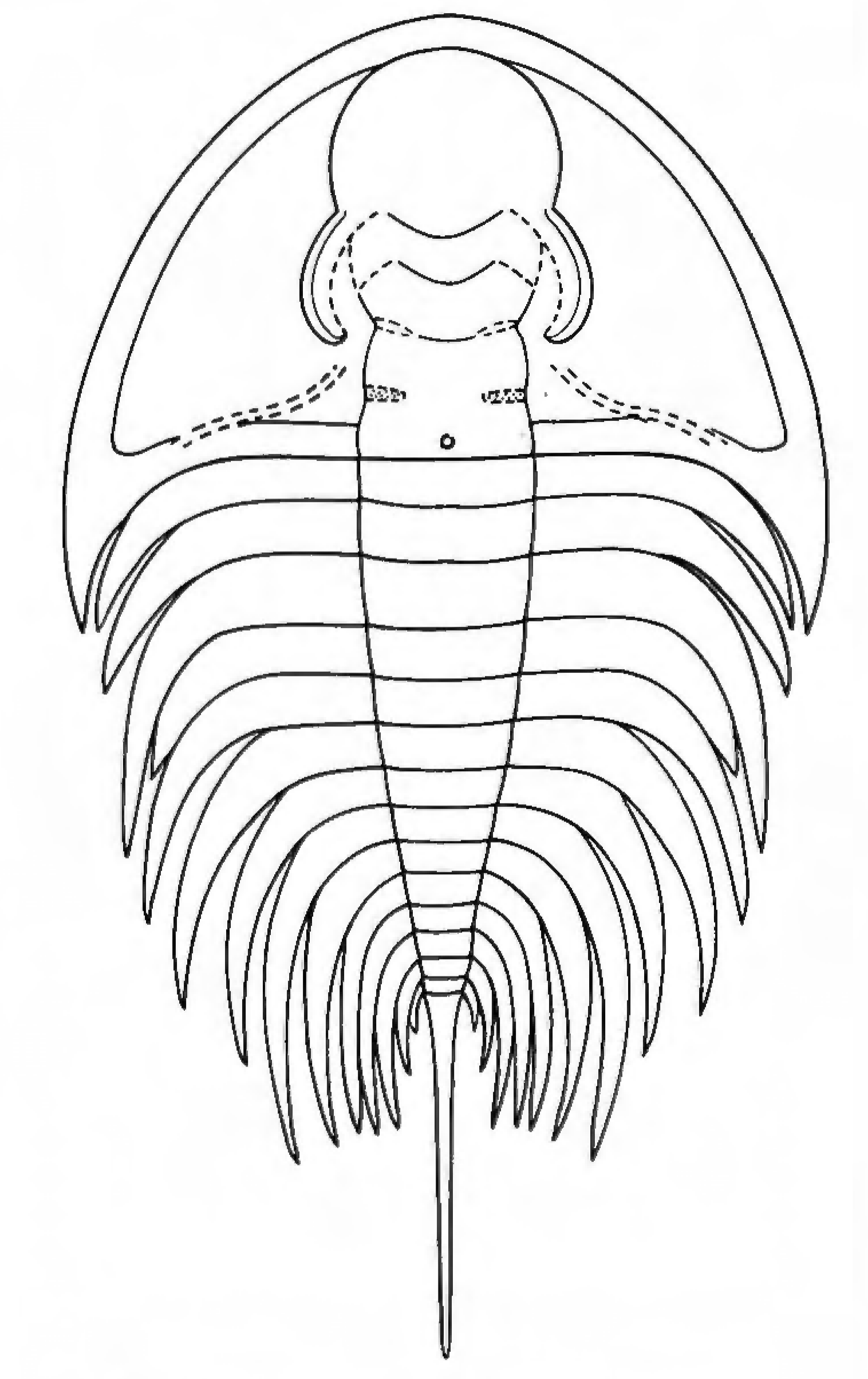
Mummaspis oblisooculatus, a new species named by Fritz in 1992

Index species for each genus indicated in brackets

Achlysopsis (liokata)

Albertelloides (mischi)

Bonnima (semidiscoidea)

Bradyfallotaspis (fusa)

Cirquella (nummularia)

Ekwipagetia (plicofimbria)

Gabriellus (lanceatus)

Geraldinella (corneiliana)

Holmiella (preancora)

Illtydaspis (quartetensis)

Keeleaspis (gratia)

Mummaspis (occidens)

Nehanniaspis (prima)

Palmettaspis (consorta)

Parafallotaspis (grata)

Sekwiaspis (artifrons)

Variopelta (laevis)

Yukonides (lacrinus)

== Selected bibliography ==
- Fritz, W.H. (1968). "Lower and early Middle Cambrian trilobites from the Pioche Shale, east-central Nevada" (PDF). Palaeontology. 11: 183–235.
- —— (1972). "Lower Cambrian trilobites from the Sekwi Formation type section, Mackenzie Mountains, northwestern Canada". Geological Survey of Canada, Bulletin 212: 1–113. doi:10.4095/100784.
- —— (1973). "Medial Lower Cambrian trilobites from the Mackenzie mountains northwestern Canada". Geological Survey of Canada, Paper 73-24. doi:10.4095/103470.
- —— (1976). "Ten stratigraphic sections from the Lower Cambrian Sekwi Formation, Mackenzie Mountains, northwestern Canada". Geological Survey of Canada, Paper 76-22. doi:10.4095/102628.
- —— (1978). "Fifteen stratigraphic sections from the Lower Cambrian of the Mackenzie Mountains, northwestern Canada". Geological Survey of Canada Paper 77-33. doi:10.4095/103391.
- —— (1979). "Eleven stratigraphic sections from the Lower Cambrian of the Mackenzie Mountains, northwestern Canada". Geological Survey of Canada Paper 78-23. doi:10.4095/105322.
- —— (1980). "International Precambrian-Cambrian Boundary Working Group's 1979 field study to Mackenzie Mountains, Northwest Territories, Canada". Current Research Part A / Recherches en Cours Partie A. 80-1a: 41–45. doi:10.4095/106180.
- —— (1991). "Lower Cambrian trilobites from the Illtyd Formation, Wernecke Mountains, Yukon Territory". Geological Survey of Canada, Bulletin 409: 1–84. doi:10.4095/134057.
- —— (1992). "Walcott's Lower Cambrian olenellid trilobite collection 61k, Mount Robson area, Canadian Rocky Mountains". Geological Survey of Canada, Bulletin 432: 1–69. doi:10.4095/134057.
- —— (1993). "New Lower Cambrian olenelloid trilobite genera Cirquella and Geraldinella from southwestern Canada". Journal of Paleontology. 67 (5): 856–868. Bibcode:1993JPal...67..856F. doi:10.1017/S0022336000037112. JSTOR 1306048. S2CID 133336696.
- —— (1995). "Esmeraldina rowei and associated Lower Cambrian trilobites (1f fauna) at the base of Walcott's Waucoban Series, southern Great Basin, USA". Journal of Paleontology. 69 (4): 708–723. Bibcode:1995JPal...69..708F. doi:10.1017/S002233600003523X. JSTOR 1306305. S2CID 131860193.
