= Olenoidestranans =

Olenoidestranans Temporal range: Dresbachian

Scientific classification
- Domain: Eukaryota
- Kingdom: Animalia
- Phylum: Arthropoda
- Class: †Trilobita
- Order: †Corynexochida
- Family: †Dorypygidae
- Genus: †Olenoidestranans; Meek, 1877

Olenoidestranans is an extinct genus from a well-known class of fossil marine arthropods, the trilobites. It lived from 501 to 490 million years ago during the Dresbachian faunal stage of the late Cambrian Period.
