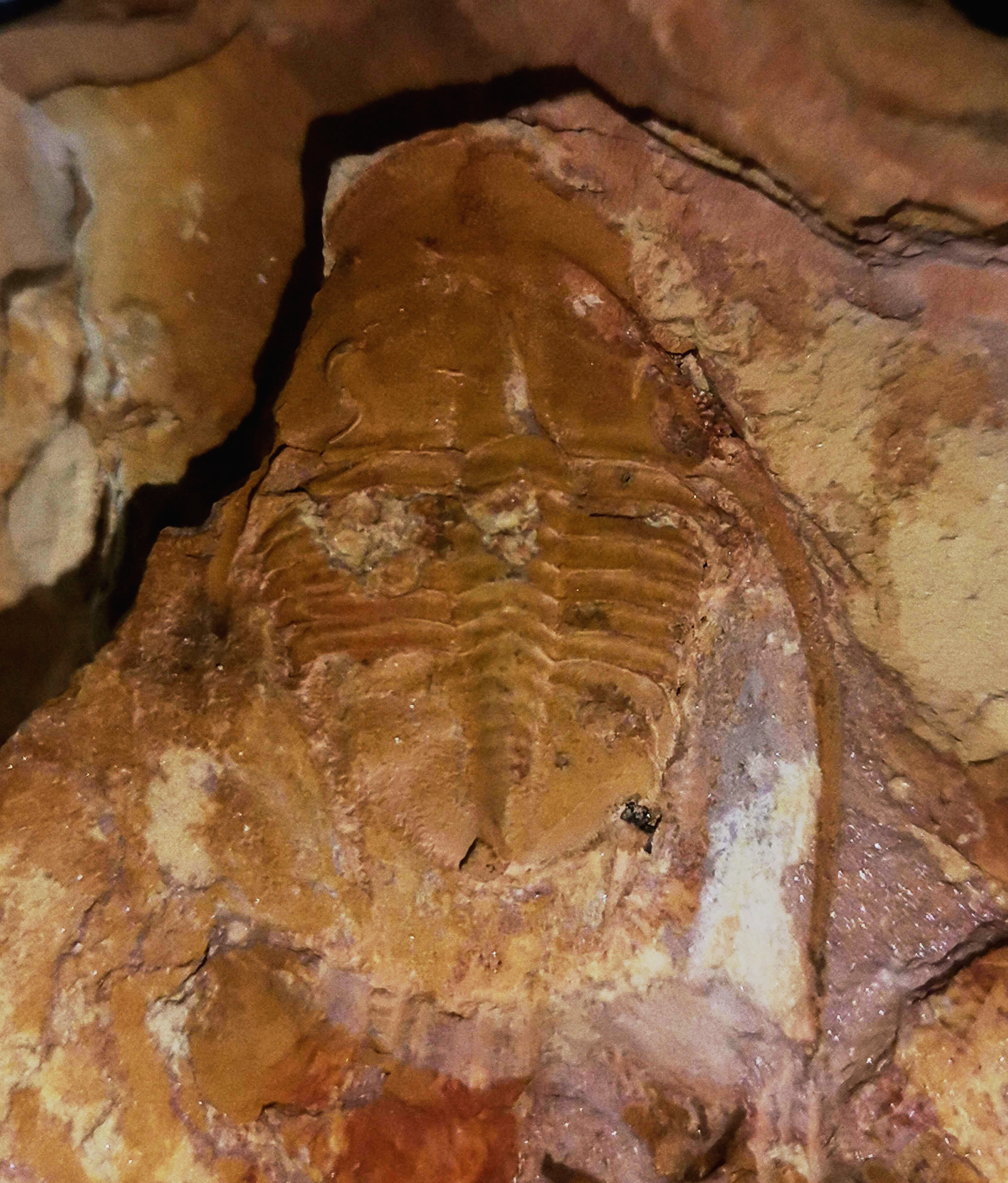
- Guangxiaspis guangxiensis fossil

Scientific classification
- Domain: Eukaryota
- Kingdom: Animalia
- Phylum: Arthropoda
- Class: †Trilobita
- Order: †Corynexochida
- Family: †Kaolishaniidae
- Genus: †Guangxiaspis; Zhou, 1977

Species
- G. guangxiensis; G. midonodus

= Guangxiaspis =

Guangxiaspis Temporal range: Furongian

Extinct genus of trilobites

Guangxiaspis is a genus of a Corynexochid trilobite belonging to the family Kaolishaniidae from the Furongian Sandu Formation, in Guole Township, Jingxi county, Guangxi province, South China.

== Morphology ==
Guangxiaspis bore prominent genal spines measuring about 1.6 times the exoskeletal length, and a pair of spines coming out of the first of seven pygidial segments which form a semi-circular pygidium with an axial elevation. The rostral plate is triangular in shape and is attached to the conterminant hypostome, this arrangement is similar to that seen in Shergoldia laevigata; however, Guangxiaspis does not exhibit the ventral median suture. The cephalon bears a wide librigenal doublure which corresponds to a long frontal region, glabella tapers slightly towards the anterior and is ornamented by 3 furrows, the eye ridges are prominent. Its thorax was composed of 10 segment. each bearing pleurae bending slightly backwards and generally not protruding beyond the exoskeleton outline. The length of the holaspid form of this trilobite ranges from about 15.5 mm to approximately 40 mm.
