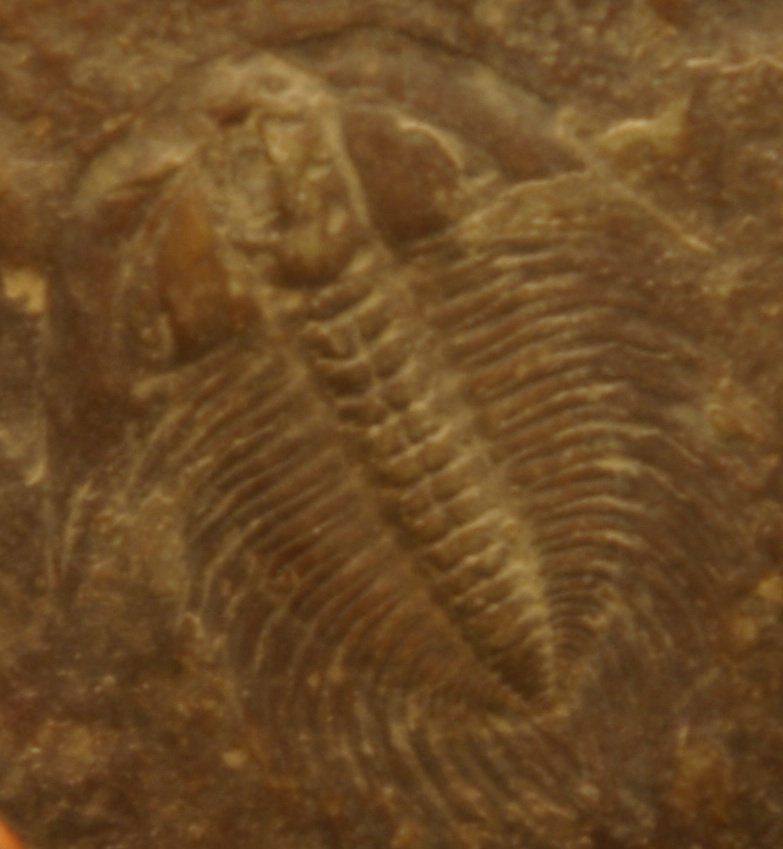
- Changaspis elongata, lower Cambrian, Guizhou province, China

Scientific classification
- Kingdom: Animalia
- Phylum: Arthropoda
- Clade: †Artiopoda
- Class: †Trilobita
- Order: †Corynexochida
- Family: †Oryctocephalidae
- Genus: †Changaspis; Lee in Chien, 1961

Species
- C. elongata Lee in Chien, 1961 (type) synonyms C. micropyge, C. placenta; C. longispina (Lee in Yegorova et al., 1963) synonym Pseudolancastria longispina; C. nangaoensis Lu and Chien in Yin and Li, 1978; C. transversa Zhou in Zhou et al. 1977

= Changaspis =

Changaspis Temporal range: first half of the Middle Cambrian

Extinct genus of trilobite

Changaspis is an extinct genus of trilobite that lived during the lower Cambrian in what is now China.

== Sources ==
- Trilobite info (Sam Gon III)
- Photo L. Placenta
