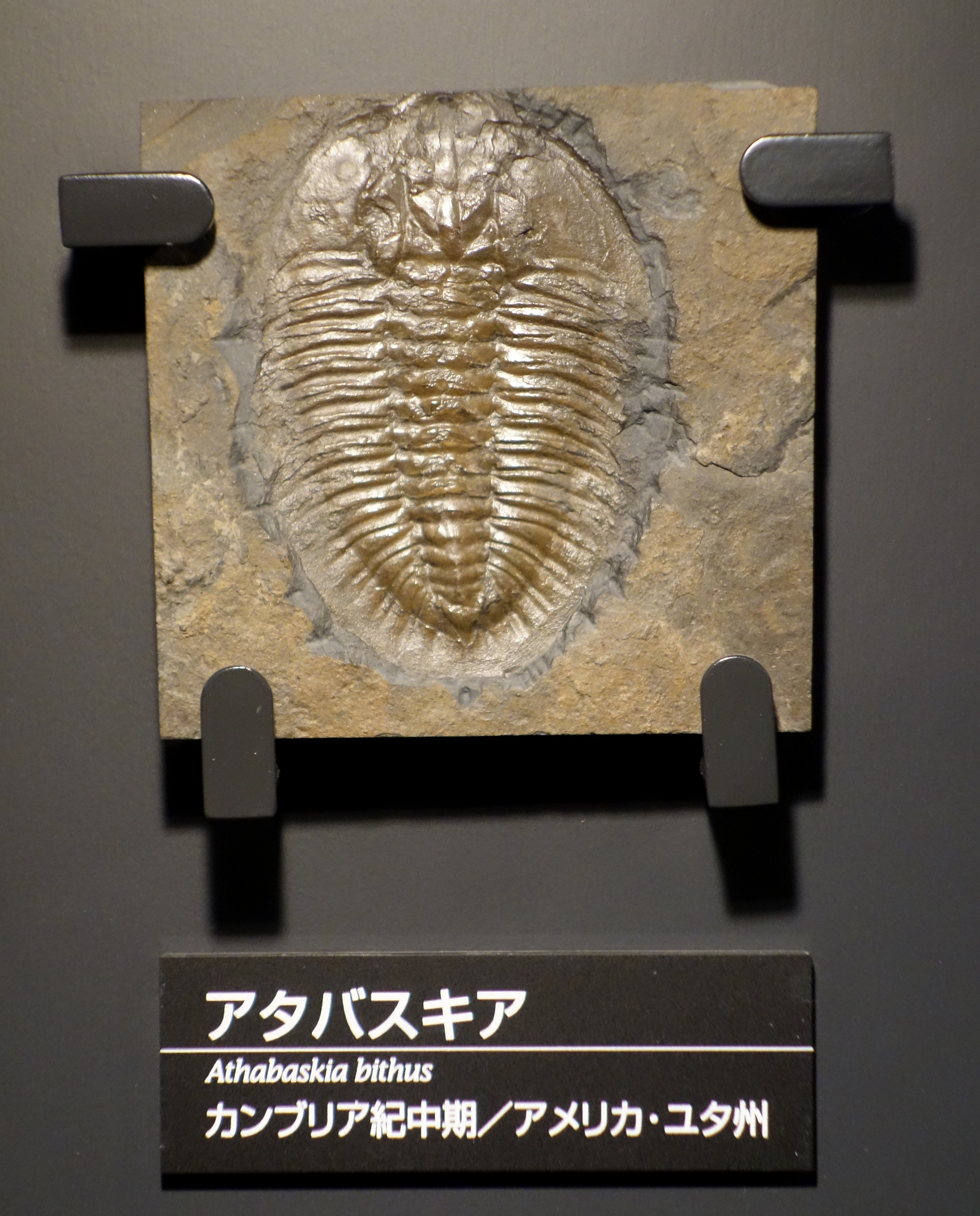
- Athabaskia bithus

Scientific classification
- Kingdom: Animalia
- Phylum: Arthropoda
- Clade: †Artiopoda
- Class: †Trilobita
- Order: †Corynexochida
- Suborder: †Corynexochina
- Family: †Dolichometopidae; Walcott, 1916

= Dolichometopidae =

Dolichometopidae Temporal range: Botomian–Dresbachian

Extinct family of trilobites

Dolichometopidae is a family of corynexochid trilobites that lived in the Cambrian, from the lower Botomian to the Dresbachian. It contains the following genera:

- Aegunaspis
- Amphoton
- Anoria
- Asperocare
- Athabaskia
- Athabaskiella
- Atypicus
- Basanellus
- Bathyuriscidella
- Bathyuriscus
- Borovikovia
- Centonella
- Chilometopus
- Chilonorria
- Clavaspidella
- Corynexochides
- Deiradonyx
- Dolicholeptus
- Dolichometopsis
- Dolichometopus
- Drozdoviella
- Erratobalticus
- Ezhuangia
- Fuchouia
- Glossopleura
- ?Granularaspis
- Guraspis
- ?Hanburia
- Hemirhodon
- Horonastes
- Itydeois
- Kannoriella
- Klotziella
- Lianhuashania
- Mendospidella
- Neopoliellina
- Parapoliella
- Poliella
- Poliellaspidella
- Poliellaspis
- Poliellina
- Politinella
- Polypleuraspis
- Prosymphysurus
- Pseudamphoton
- Ptannigania
- Saimixiella
- Sestrostega
- Shanghaia
- Sinijanella
- Suvorovaaspis
- Undillia
- Zhenpingaspis
