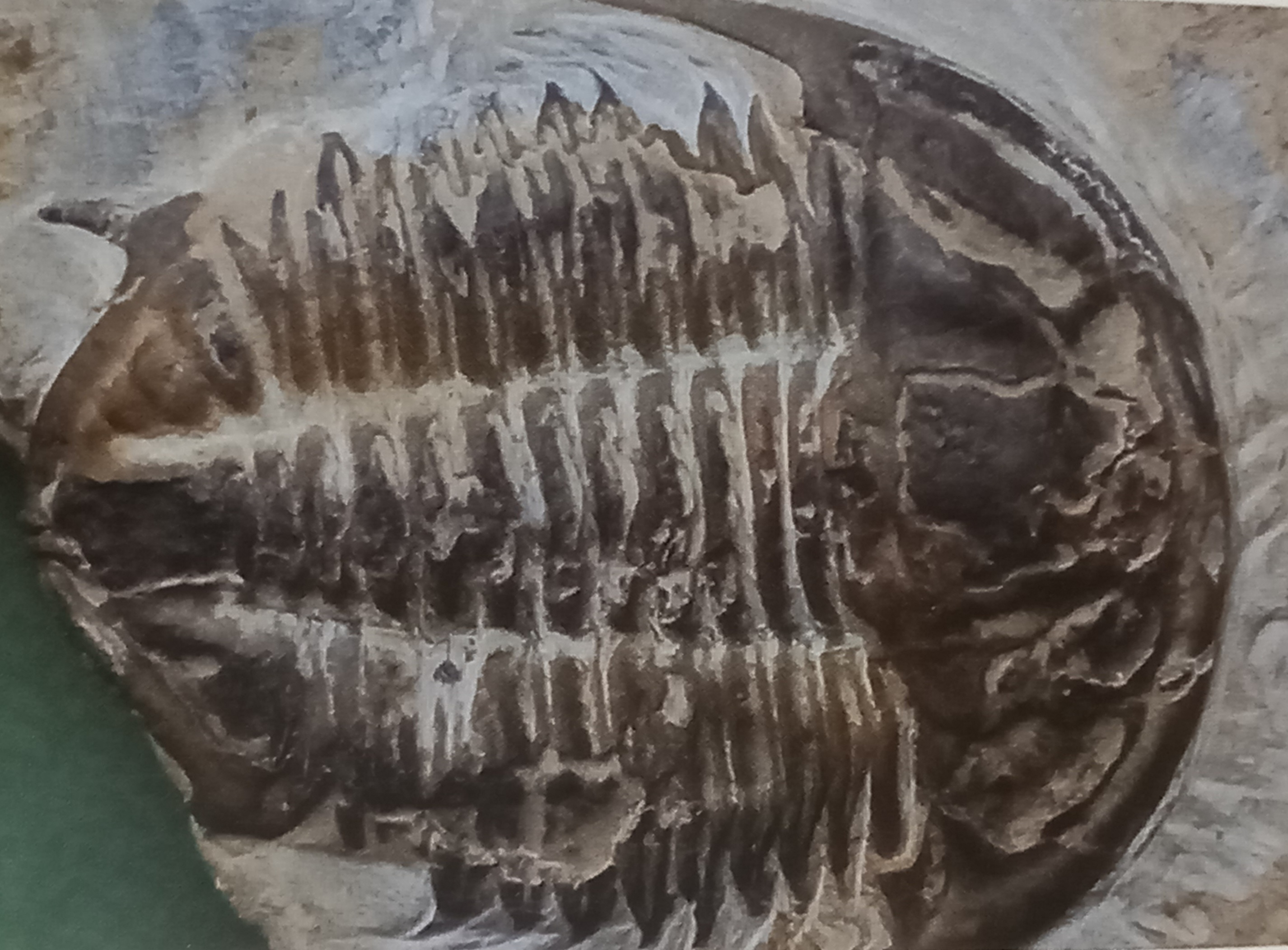
- Prochuangia from the Cambrian Darnjal Formation, Tabas, Iran

Scientific classification
- Domain: Eukaryota
- Kingdom: Animalia
- Phylum: Arthropoda
- Class: †Trilobita
- Order: †Corynexochida
- Family: †Leiostegiidae
- Genus: †Prochuangia; Kobayashi 1935

= Prochuangia =

Prochuangia Temporal range: 501.0–470 Ma (Note: Age of the Caradoc varies among sources)

Extinct genus of trilobites

Prochuangia is an extinct genus of trilobites reported from the Cambrian and Ordovician, It is reported from Iran, China, Australia, France, Türkiye, and Kazakhstan.

== Gallery ==
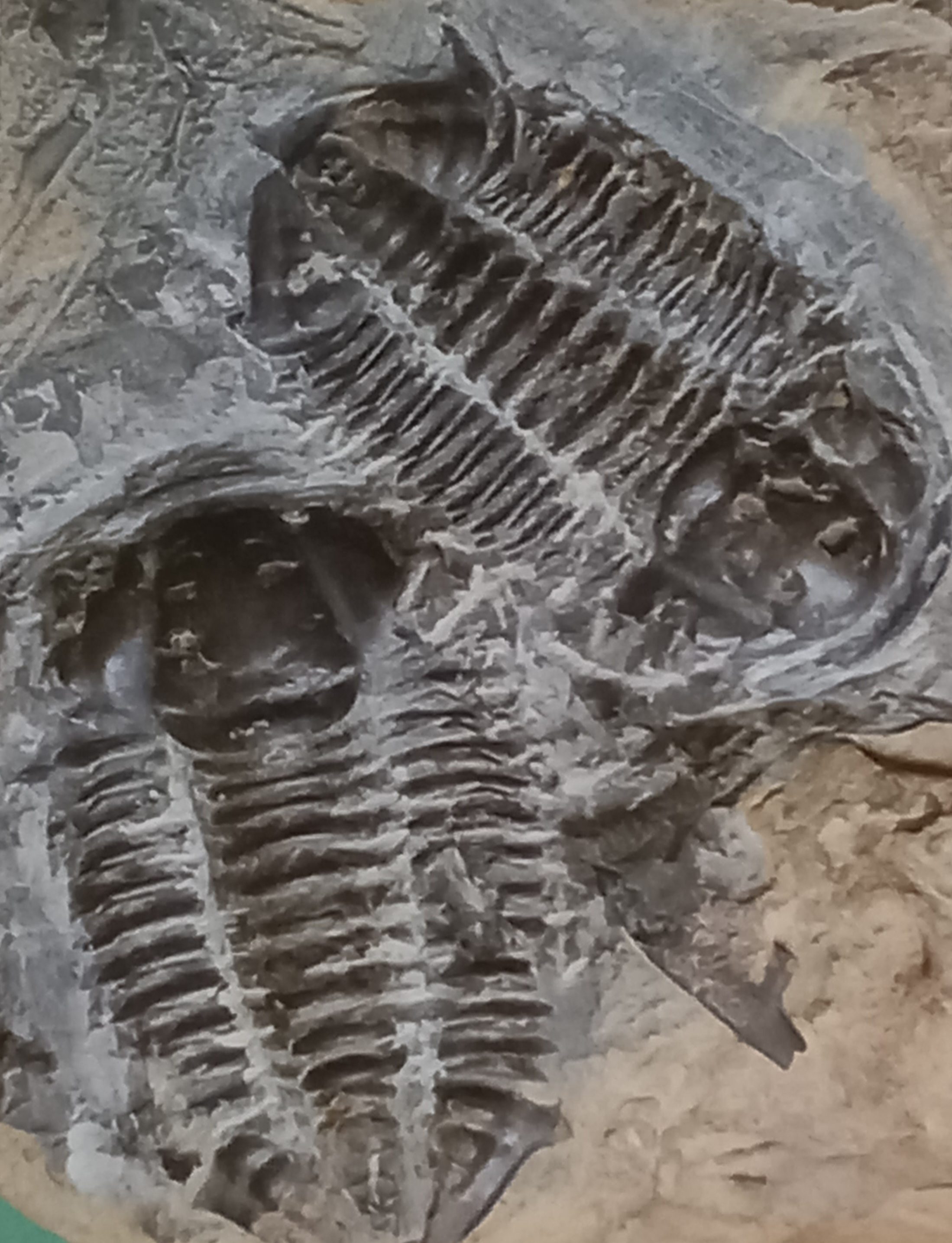

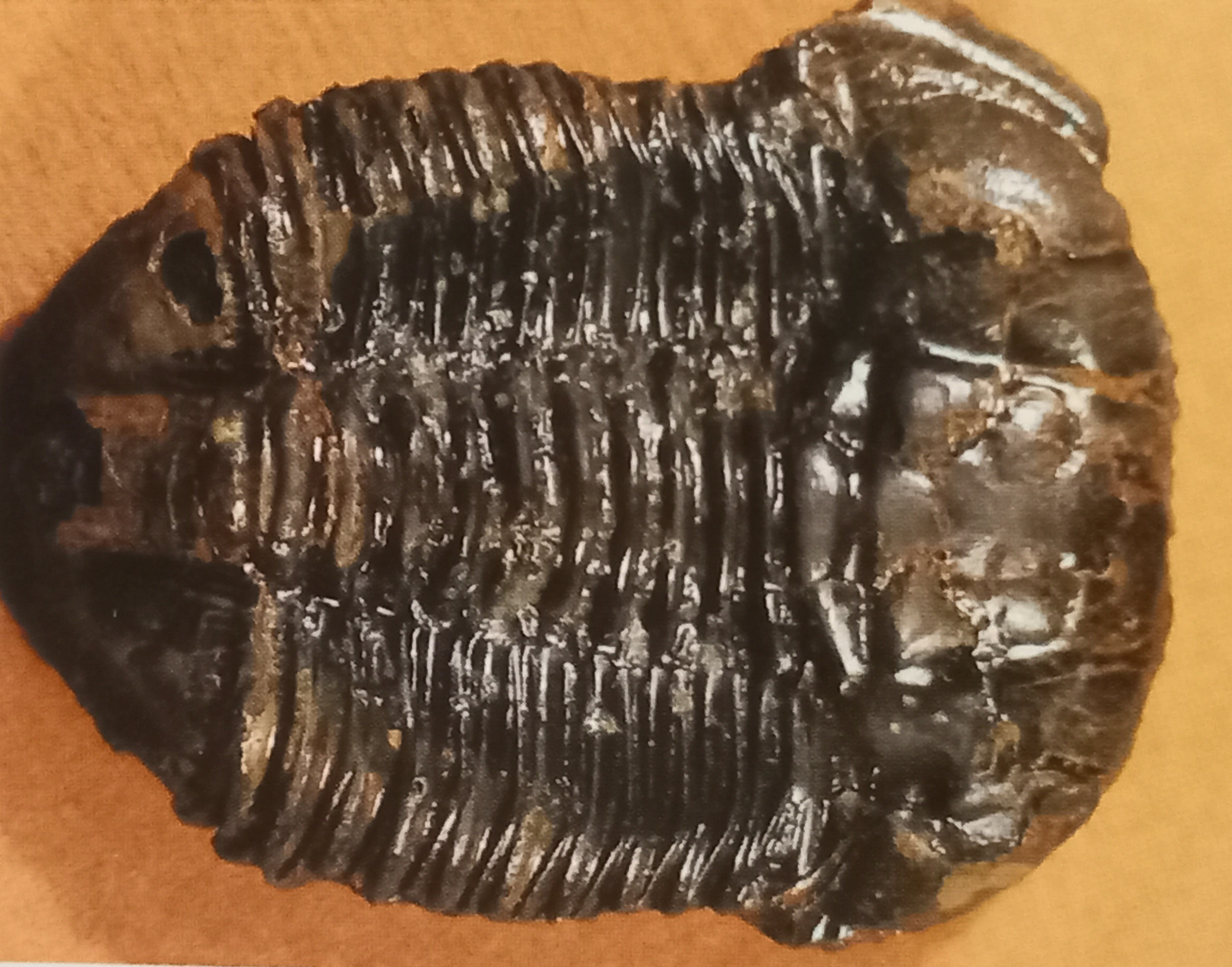
