= Szechuanella =

Szechuanella Temporal range: 500–460 Ma Cambrian and Ordovician

Scientific classification
- Kingdom: Animalia
- Phylum: Arthropoda
- Clade: †Artiopoda
- Class: †Trilobita
- Order: †Corynexochida
- Family: †Leiostegiidae
- Genus: †Szechuanella; Lu, 1962

Extinct genus of trilobites

Szechuanella is an extinct genus of corynexochid trilobite that lived marine environments from the middle Cambrian to the early Ordovician in what is now China.
