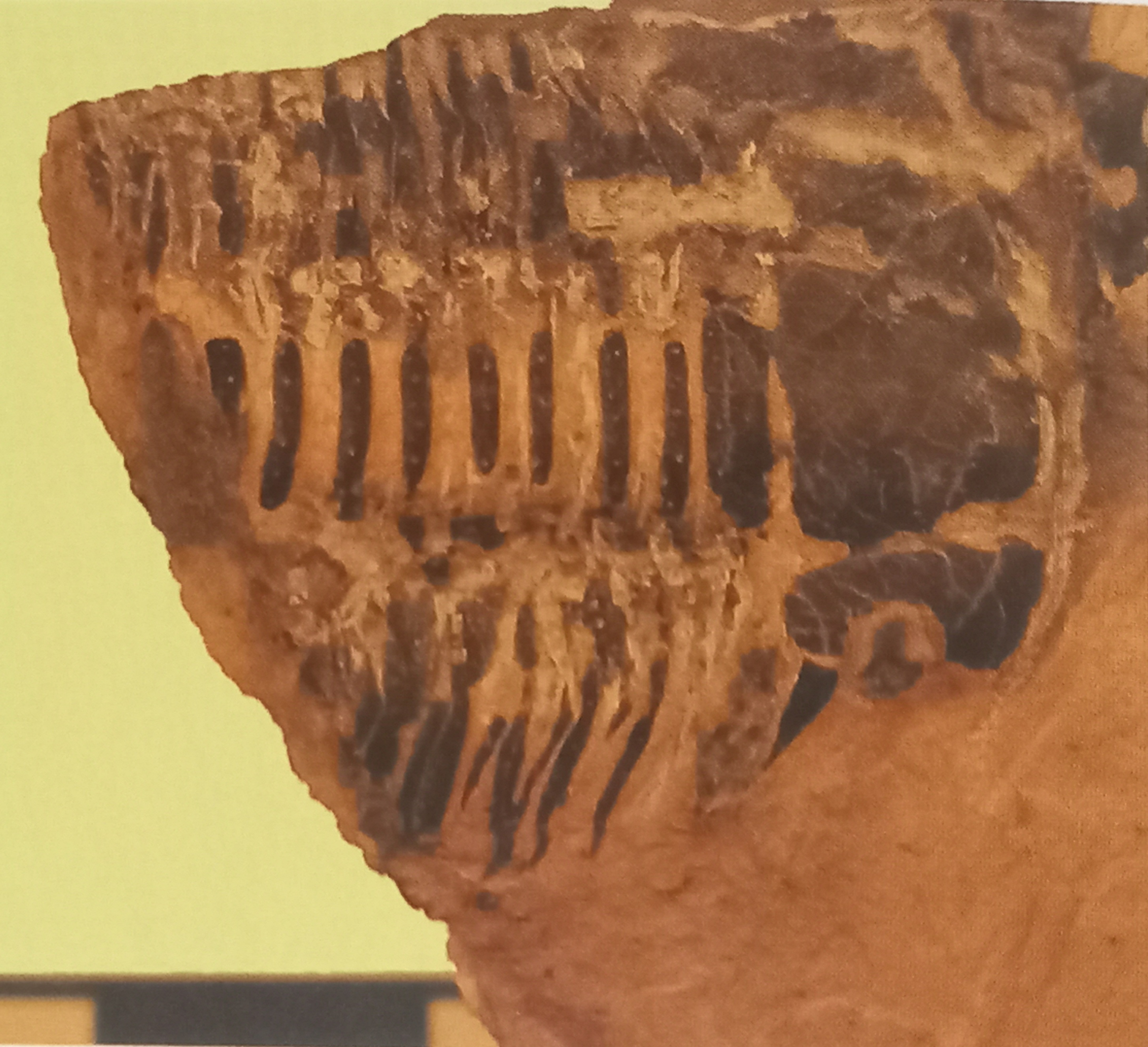
- Iranaspis fossil from the Shirgasht Formation of Tabas, Iran

Scientific classification
- Domain: Eukaryota
- Kingdom: Animalia
- Phylum: Arthropoda
- Clade: †Artiopoda
- Class: †Trilobita
- Order: †Corynexochida
- Family: †Leiostegiidae
- Genus: †Iranaspis; King, 1937

= Iranaspis =

Iranaspis Temporal range: 485.4–443.8 Ma

Extinct genus of trilobites

Iranaspis is an extinct genus of trilobites in the family Leiostegiidae. It has been reported from the Ordovician period from Iran.
