= Jakutidae =

Scientific classification
- Domain: Eukaryota
- Kingdom: Animalia
- Phylum: Arthropoda
- Class: †Trilobita
- Order: †Corynexochida
- Suborder: †Corynexochina
- Family: †Jakutidae; Suvorova, 1950

Extinct family of trilobites

Jakutidae is an extinct family of trilobite in the order Corynexochida.

== Genera ==
These genera belong to the family Jakutidae:

- † Bathyuriscellus Lermontova, 1951
- † Bathyuriscopsis Suvorova, 1960
- † Jakutus Lermontova, 1951
- † Judaiella Lermontova, 1951
- † Lenaspis Suvorova, 1959
- † Malykania Suvorova, 1958
- † Prouktaspis Repina, 1965
- † Uktaspis Korobov, 1963
