= Dinesidae =

Scientific classification
- Domain: Eukaryota
- Kingdom: Animalia
- Phylum: Arthropoda
- Class: †Trilobita
- Order: †Corynexochida
- Suborder: †Corynexochina
- Family: †Dinesidae; Lermontova, 1940

Extinct family of trilobites

Dinesidae is an extinct family of trilobite in the order Corynexochida.

== Genera ==
These genera belong to the family Dinesidae:

- † Aldanianus Özdikmen, 2006
- † Amginoerbia Chernysheva, 1967
- † Botomella Suvorova, 1958
- † Chakasskia Poletayeva, 1936
- † Chakasskinella Repina, 1964
- † Dilataspis Fedjanina, 1999
- † Dinesus Etheridge, 1896
- † Erbia Lermontova, 1940
- † Erbiella Fedyanina, 1962
- † Erbina Pokrovskaya, 1959
- † Erbiopsidella Pokrovskaya, 1959
- † Erbiopsis Lermontova, 1940
- † Haydenaspis Peng, Hughes, Heim, Sell, Zhu, Myrow & Parcha, 2009
- † Proerbia Lermontova, 1940
- † Pseudoerbia Repina, 1964
- † Rondocephalus Pokrovskaya, 1959
- † Tollaspis Kobayashi, 1935
