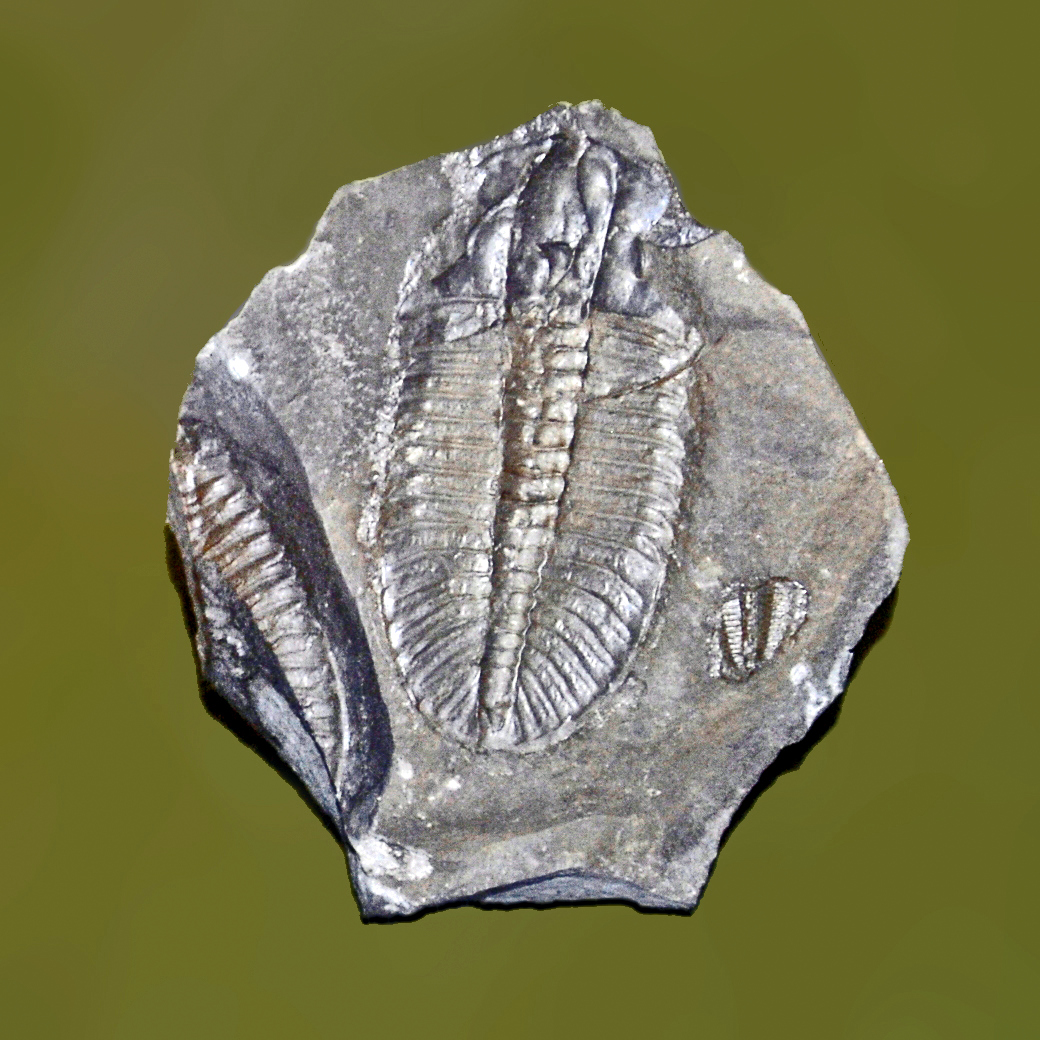
- Ogygopsis klotzi

Scientific classification
- Domain: Eukaryota
- Kingdom: Animalia
- Phylum: Arthropoda
- Class: †Trilobita
- Order: †Corynexochida
- Suborder: †Corynexochina
- Family: †Dorypygidae; Kobayashi 1935

= Dorypygidae =

Dorypygidae Temporal range: 516–498.5 Ma

Extinct family of trilobites

Dorypygidae is a family of trilobite belonging to the order Corynexochida.

== Genera ==
- Atdabanella Repina 1965
- Basocephalus Ivshin 1952
- Bonnaria Lochman 1956
- Bonnia Walcott 1916
- Bonniella Resser 1937
- Bonnima Fritz 1991
- Bonniopsis Poulsen 1946
- Dorypyge Dames 1883
- Dorypygina Lermontova 1940
- Fordaspis Lochman 1956
- Hicksia Delgado 1904
- Holteria Walcott 1924
- Holyoakia Palmer and Rowell 1995
- Kootenia Walcott 1899
- Kooteniella Lermontova 1940
- Kooteniellina Sivov 1955
- Liokootenia Qiu 1983
- Mengzia Lo 1974
- Metakootenia Qiu 1983
- Ogygopsis Walcott 1889
- Olenoides Meek 1877
- Olenoidestranans Meek 1877
- Paraolenoides Ivshin 1952
- Popigaia Egorova 1967
- Prokootenia Lermontova 1940
- Protypus Walcott 1986
- Shipaiella Zhang et al. 1980
- Strettonia Cobbold 1931
- Tabatopygellina Sivov 1955
- Tolanaspis Ivshin 1952
