= Chuangiopsis =

Chuangiopsis Temporal range: 485.4–443.8 Ma

Scientific classification
- Domain: Eukaryota
- Kingdom: Animalia
- Phylum: Arthropoda
- Class: †Trilobita
- Order: †Corynexochida
- Family: †Leiostegiidae
- Genus: †Chuangiopsis; Chang, 1974

Genus of trilobites

Chuangiopsis is a genus of trilobites.
