= Eochuangia =

Eochuangia Temporal range: Cambrian

Scientific classification
- Domain: Eukaryota
- Kingdom: Animalia
- Phylum: Arthropoda
- Class: †Trilobita
- Order: †Corynexochida
- Family: †Leiostegiidae
- Genus: †Eochuangia; Kobayashi, 1935

Extinct genus of trilobites

Eochuangia is an extinct genus from a well-known class of fossil marine arthropods, the trilobites. It lived during the Cambrian Period, which lasted from approximately 541 to 488 million years ago.
