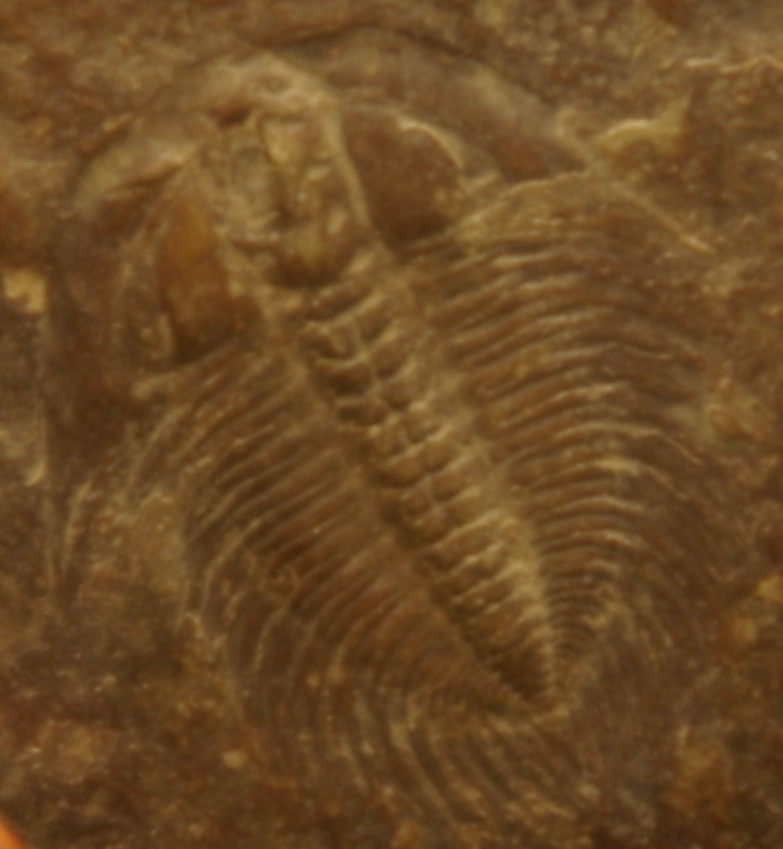
- Fossil of Changaspis Elongate, a member of Oryctocephalidae.

Scientific classification
- Domain: Eukaryota
- Kingdom: Animalia
- Phylum: Arthropoda
- Class: †Trilobita
- Order: †Corynexochida
- Suborder: †Corynexochina
- Family: †Oryctocephalidae; Beecher, 1897

= Oryctocephalidae =

Extinct family of trilobites

Oryctocephalidae is an extinct family of trilobite in the order Corynexochida. There are more than 20 genera and 60 described species in Oryctocephalidae.

== Genera ==
These 27 genera belong to the family Oryctocephalidae:

- † Arthricocephalus Bergeron, 1899
- † Changaspis Lee, 1963
- † Cheiruroides Kobayashi, 1935
- † Curvoryctocephalus Zhao & Yuan, 2001
- † Duyunaspis Chien & Lin, 1978
- † Feilongshania Qian & Lin, 1980
- † Goldfieldia Palmer, 1964
- † Hunanocephalus Lee, 1963
- † Kunshanaspis Zhang & Zhou, 1985
- † Metabalangia Qian & Yuan, 1980
- † Metarthricocephalus Zhao & Yuan, 2001
- † Microryctocara Sundberg & McCollum, 1997
- † Oryctocara Walcott, 1908
- † Oryctocephalina Tomashpolskaya, 1961
- † Oryctocephalites Resser, 1939
- † Oryctocephaloides Yuan, 1980
- † Oryctocephalops Lermontova, 1940
- † Oryctocephalus Walcott, 1886
- † Oryctometopus Tomashpol'skaya, 1964
- † Ovatoryctocara Chernysheva, 1962
- † Paleooryctocephalus Repina, 1964
- † Parachangaspis Liu, 1982
- † Protoryctocephalus Chow, 1974
- † Sandoveria Shergold, 1969
- † Shabaella Qian & Sun, 1977
- † Shergoldiella Geyer, 2006
- † Tonkinella Mansuy, 1922
