= Corynexochidae =

Scientific classification
- Domain: Eukaryota
- Kingdom: Animalia
- Phylum: Arthropoda
- Class: †Trilobita
- Order: †Corynexochida
- Suborder: †Corynexochina
- Family: †Corynexochidae; Angelin, 1854

Extinct family of trilobites

Corynexochidae Angelin, 1854, is an extinct family of trilobites within the order Corynexochida Kobayashi, 1935. According to Jell and Adrain (2002) there are at least 15 genera within the family Corynexochidae:

== Genera ==
- † Abakania Poletaeva, 1973
- † Acontheus Angelin, 1851
- † Bonnaspis Resser, 1936
- † Chatiania Yang, 1977
- † Clavigellus Geyer, 1994
- † Corynexochella Suvorova, 1964
- † Corynexochina Lermontova, 1940
- † Corynexochus Angelin, 1854
- † Eochatiania Yuan and Yin, 1998
- † Eocorynexochus Korobeinikova, 1965
- † Milaspis Sivov, 1960
- † Miranella Pokrovskaya, 1960
- † Sanaschtykgolia Poletaeva, 1960
- † Shivelicus Pokrovskaya, 1959
- † Stenochilina Ulrich, 1931
- † Trinia Poletaeva, 1956
