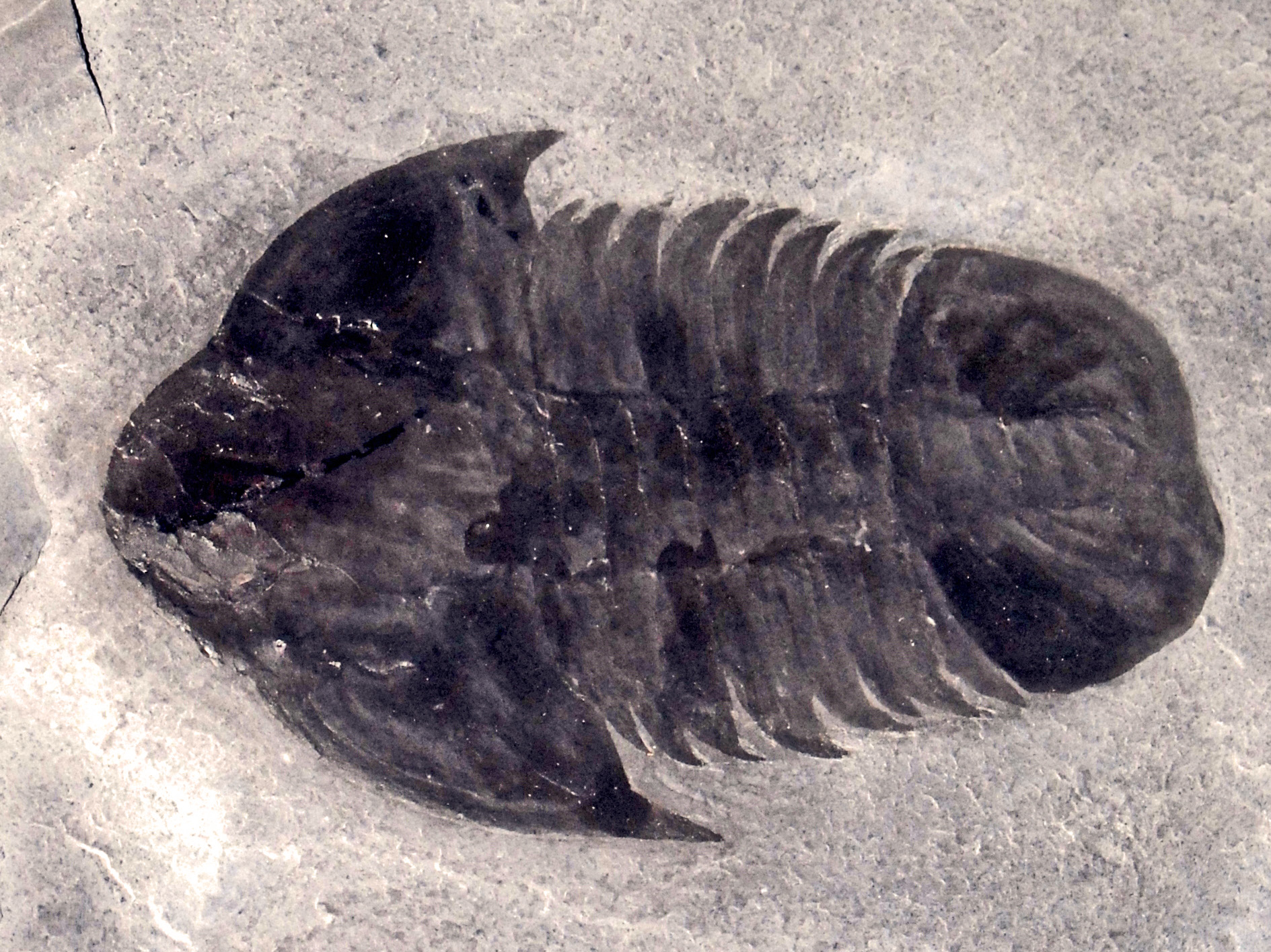
- Hemirhodon amplipyge

Scientific classification
- Kingdom: Animalia
- Phylum: Arthropoda
- Clade: †Artiopoda
- Class: †Trilobita
- Order: †Corynexochida
- Family: †Dolichometopidae
- Genus: †Hemirhodon; Raymond, 1937

= Hemirhodon =

Hemirhodon Temporal range: Cambrian

Genus of trilobites

Hemirhodon is a genus of trilobites that lived in the Cambrian, from the middle Cambrian to the Dresbachian.
