= Trinia (trilobite) =

Trinia Temporal range: Cambrian

Scientific classification
- Domain: Eukaryota
- Kingdom: Animalia
- Phylum: Arthropoda
- Class: †Trilobita
- Order: †Corynexochida
- Family: †Corynexochidae
- Genus: †Trinia; Poletaeva, 1956

Extinct genus of trilobite

Trinia Poletaeva, 1956, is an extinct genus from a well-known class of fossil marine arthropods, the trilobites. It lived during the Cambrian Period, which lasted from approximately 542 to 488 million years ago.
