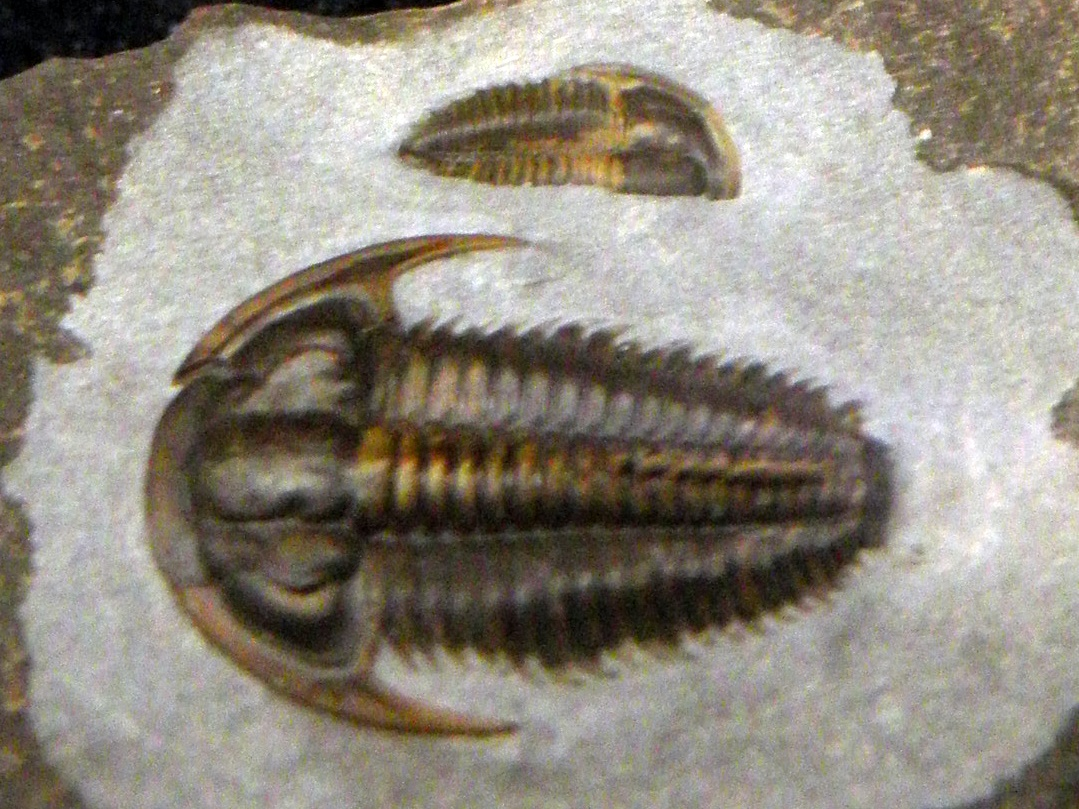
- Bathyuriscellus sinensis

Scientific classification
- Domain: Eukaryota
- Kingdom: Animalia
- Phylum: Arthropoda
- Class: †Trilobita
- Order: †Corynexochida
- Family: †Jakutidae
- Genus: †Bathyuriscellus; Lermontova, 1951

= Bathyuriscellus =

Bathyuriscellus Temporal range: Botomian

Bathyuriscellus is an extinct genus from a well-known class of fossil marine arthropods, the trilobites. It lived during the Botomian stage, which lasted from approximately 524 to 518.5 million years ago. This faunal stage was part of the Cambrian Period.
