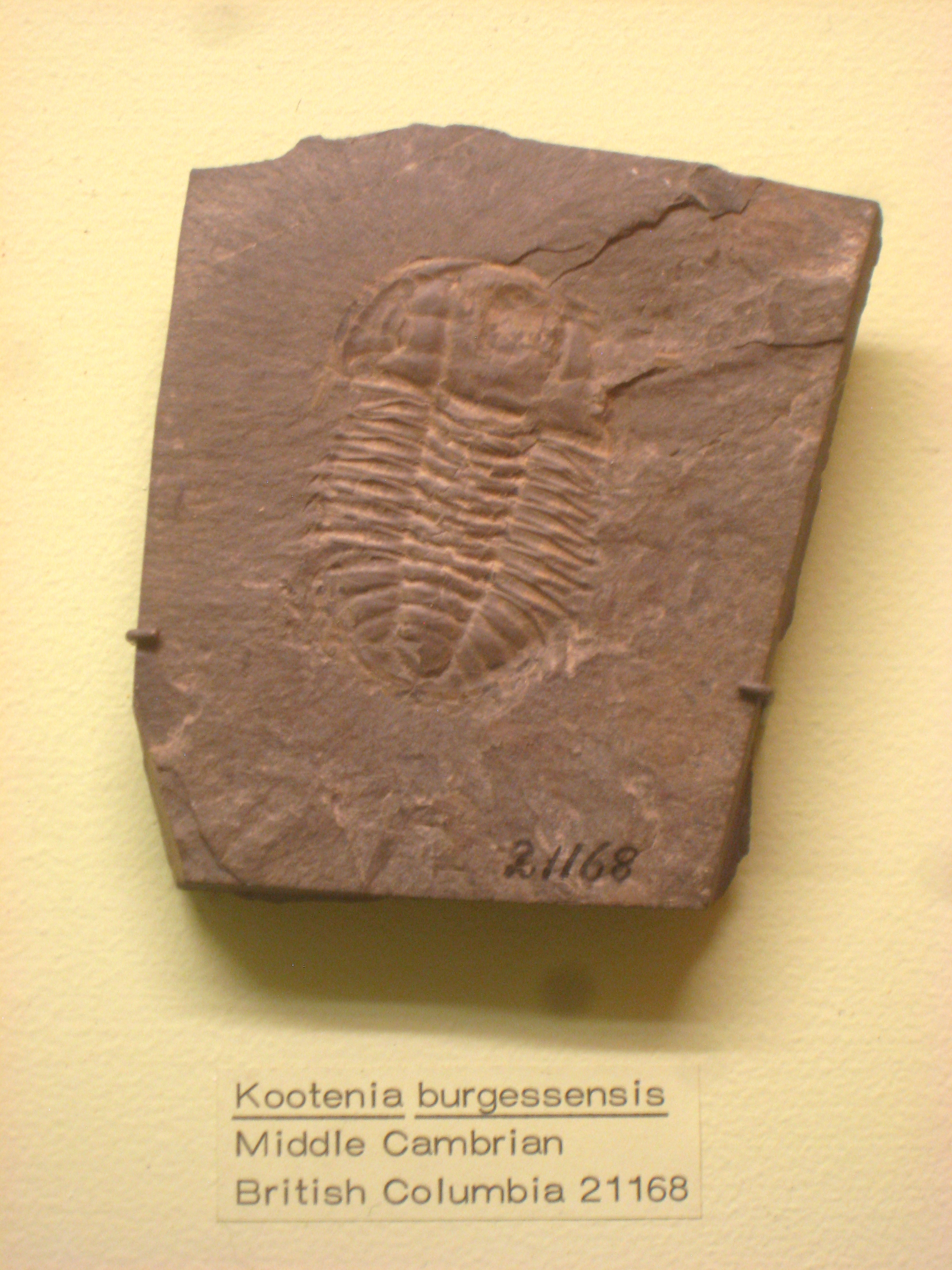
- Kootenia burgessensis

Scientific classification
- Kingdom: Animalia
- Phylum: Arthropoda
- Clade: †Artiopoda
- Class: †Trilobita
- Order: †Corynexochida
- Family: †Dorypygidae
- Genus: †Kootenia; Walcott, 1889

Species
- K. dawsoni Walcott, 1889 - Type species. K. aculacauda Fritz, 1968 ' K. brevispina Resser, 1939; K. burgessensis Whittington, 1975; K. convoluta Resser, 1939; K. crassa Fritz, 1968; K. crassinucha Fritz, 1968; K. diutina Fritz, 1972; K. fergusoni Gregory, 1903; K. germona K. marcoui K. mckeei K. modica Whitehouse, 1939; K. spencei Resser, 1939; K. styrax Palmer & Gatehouse, 1972, K. westergårdi Thorslund, 1949

= Kootenia =

Kootenia Temporal range: Middle Cambrian

Extinct genus of trilobites

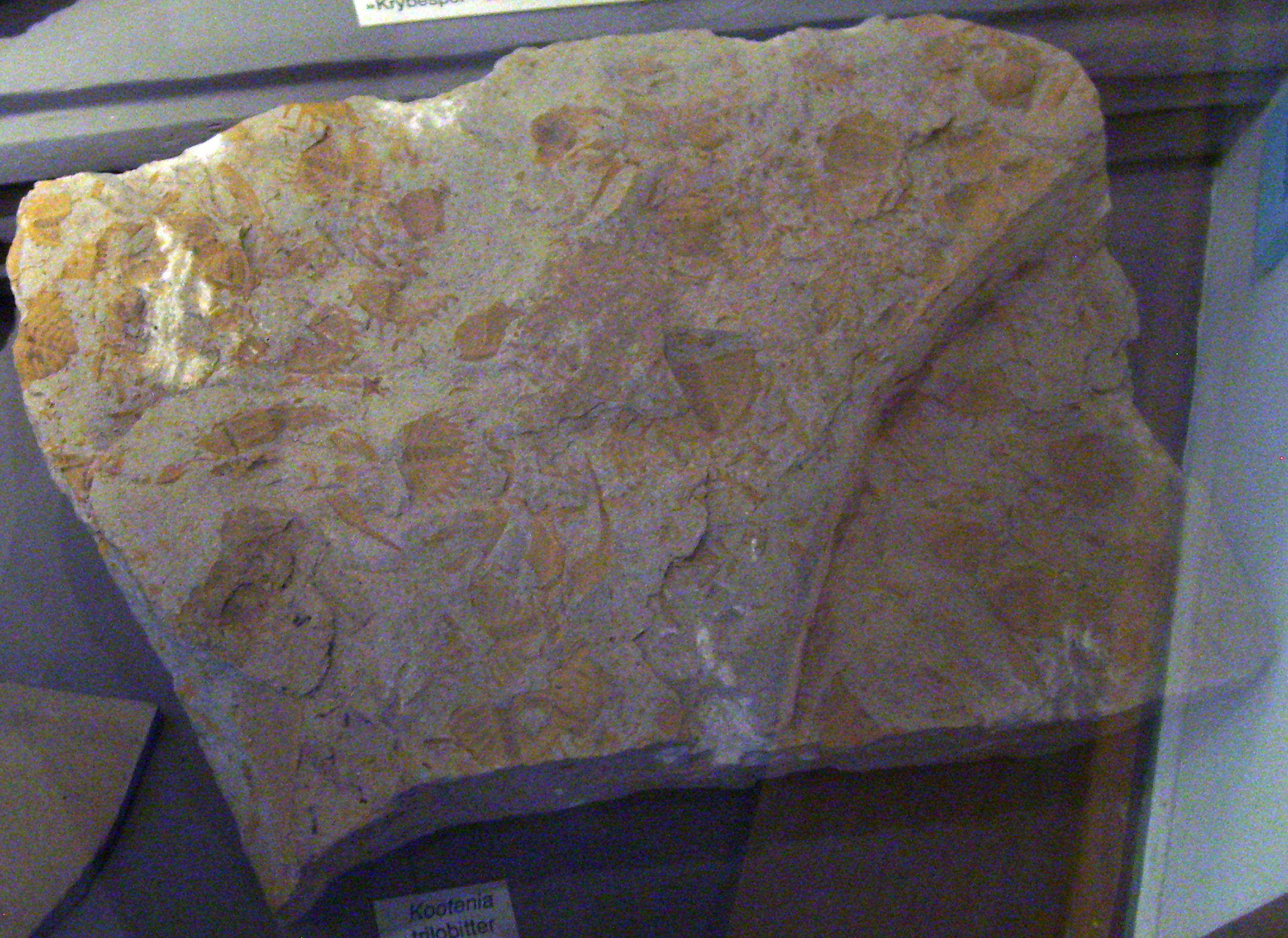
Kootenia assemblage at the Geological Museum in Copenhagen

Kootenia is a genus of trilobites of the family Dorypygidae. 118 specimens of Kootenia are known from the Greater Phyllopod bed, where they comprise 0.22% of the community. Its major characteristics are that of the closely related Olenoides, including medium size, a large glabella, and a medium-sized pygidium, but also a lack of the strong interpleural furrows on the pygidium that Olenoides has.

== Type species ==
Bathyuriscus (Kootenia) dawsoni Walcott, 1889. From the Burgess shale (the Stephen formation) of British Columbia.

== Synonyms ==
Kootenia is sometimes believed to be a junior synonym of Olenoides due to the marked similarities, and the fact that the main difference between them seems to be variable.
