= Amphotonella =

Amphotonella Temporal range: Cambrian

Scientific classification
- Kingdom: Animalia
- Phylum: Arthropoda
- Clade: †Artiopoda
- Class: †Trilobita
- Order: †Corynexochida
- Family: †Dolichometopidae
- Genus: †Amphotonella; Kobayashi, 1942

Amphotonella is an extinct genus from a well-known class of fossil marine arthropods, the trilobites. It lived during the Cambrian Period, which lasted from approximately 542 to 488 million years ago.
