= Edelsteinaspididae =

Scientific classification
- Domain: Eukaryota
- Kingdom: Animalia
- Phylum: Arthropoda
- Class: †Trilobita
- Order: †Corynexochida
- Suborder: †Corynexochina
- Family: †Edelsteinaspididae; Hupé 1953

Extinct family of trilobites

Edelsteinaspididae is an extinct family of trilobite in the order Corynexochida. There are about ten genera in Edelsteinaspididae.

== Genera ==
These genera belong to the family Edelsteinaspididae:

- † Alacephalus Repina, 1960
- † Edelsteinaspis Lermontova, 1940
- † Gelasene Palmer, 1968
- † Labradoria Resser, 1936
- † Laticephalus Pokrovskaya, 1959
- † Litaspis Suvorova, 1960
- † Nehanniaspis Fritz, 1972
- † Nodiceps Suvorova, 1959
- † Paleofossus Pokrovskaya, 1959
- † Polliaxis Palmer, 1968
