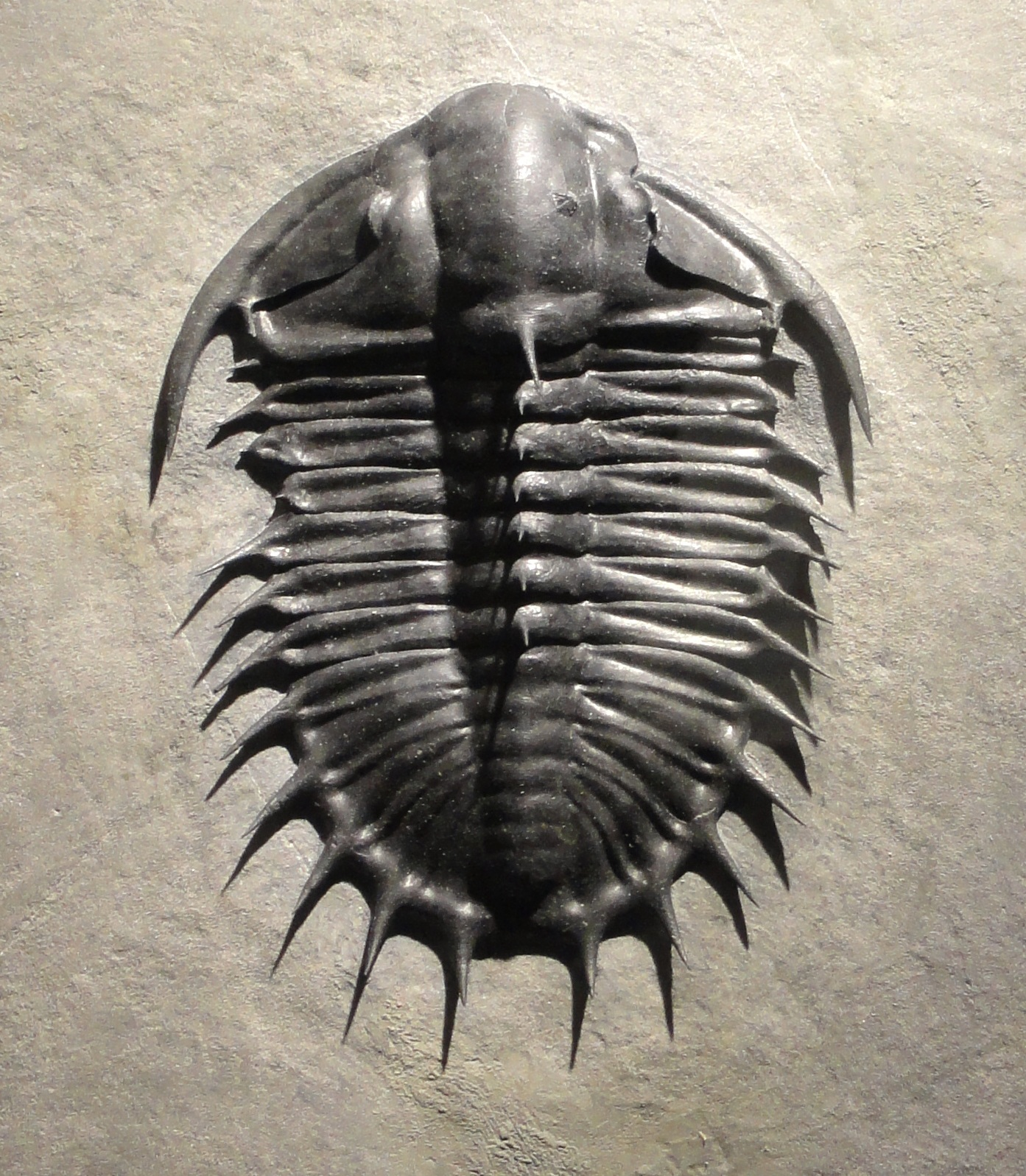
- Olenoides superbus from the Upper Marjum Formation
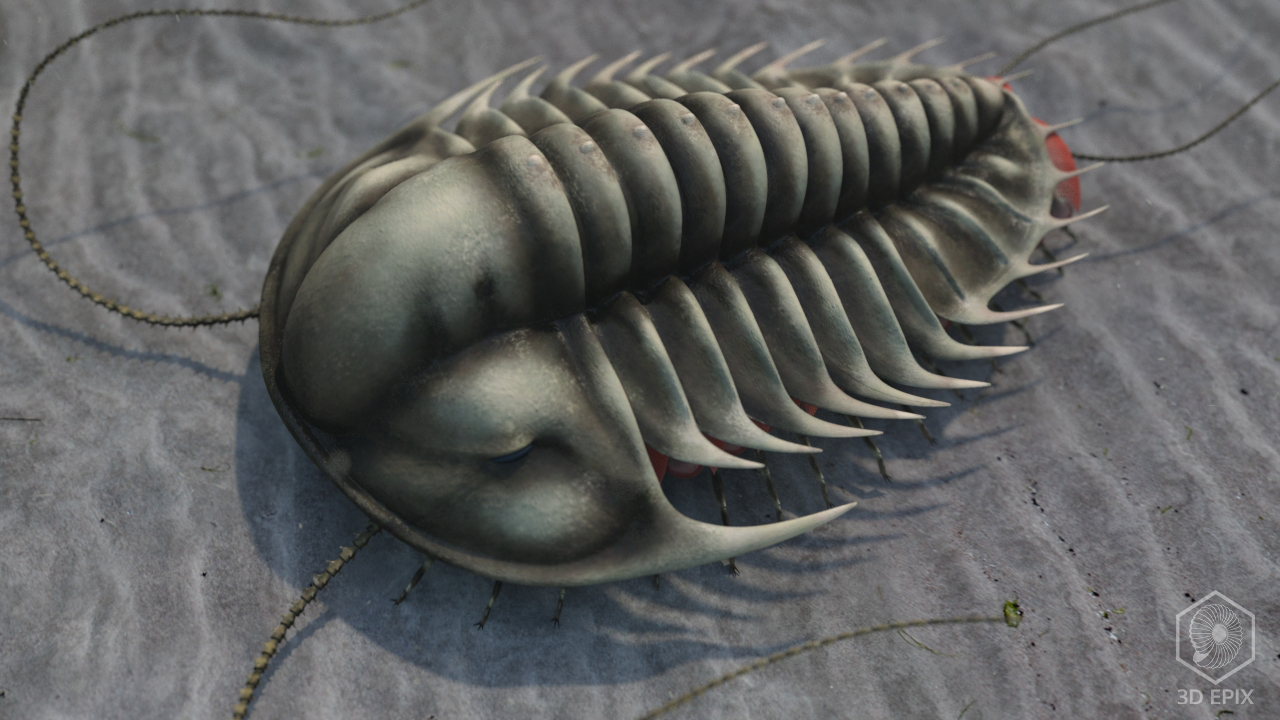
- 3D reconstruction of Olenoides serratus

Scientific classification
- Kingdom: Animalia
- Phylum: Arthropoda
- Clade: †Artiopoda
- Class: †Trilobita
- Order: †Corynexochida
- Family: †Dorypygidae
- Genus: †Olenoides; Meek, 1877

= Olenoides =

Olenoides Temporal range: upper Middle to lower Upper Cambrian

Genus of trilobites

Olenoides is a genus of trilobite from the Cambrian period. Its fossils can be found with soft body parts intact in the Burgess Shale in Canada. Fossils of this genus can also be found in the Wheeler Shale and Marjum Formation of Utah in the United States of America, among other localities. Species within this genus range in size, with most being medium-sized trilobites (Olenoides serratus from the Burgess Shale can be up to 9 centimeters in length). Specimens of Olenoides superbus, pictured on the right, an especially large species, can reach sizes of well over 10 centimeters in length. Olenoides is part of the order Corynexochida, which is among the most ancient trilobite orders.

== Etymology ==
Olenoides – from Olenus, in Greek mythology a man who, along with his wife Lethaea, was turned to stone. Olenus was used for a trilobite genus name in 1827; the suffix -oides(“resembling”) was added later.

== Discussion ==
Olenoides followed the basic structure of all trilobites — a cephalon (head shield), a thorax with seven jointed parts, and finally a semicircular pygidium. Its antennae were long, and curved back along its sides. Its thin legs show that it was no swimmer, instead crawling along the sea floor in search of prey. This is also evidenced by fossil tracks that have been found. Conspicuous W-shaped wounds, often partially healed, on Olenoides specimens may be due to predation by Anomalocaris.

Its major characteristics are a large parallel-sided glabella, deep interpleural furrows on the pygidium, and slender pygidial spines, as well as the fact that it is the most common limb-bearing trilobite species in the Burgess Shale.

Specimens have been found in the Marjumian of the United States (Utah and New York). General Cambrian fossils have been found in Canada (British Columbia and Newfoundland), Greenland, Kazakhstan, Russia, and the USA (Idaho, Nevada for which O. nevadensis is named, New York, Pennsylvania for which O. pennsylvanicus is named, Virginia, Utah, and Wyoming).

213 specimens of Olenoides are known from the Greater Phyllopod bed, where they comprise 0.4% of the community. The Burgess Shale's preservative qualities have helped Olenoides become one of the best known of trilobites.

== Synonyms ==
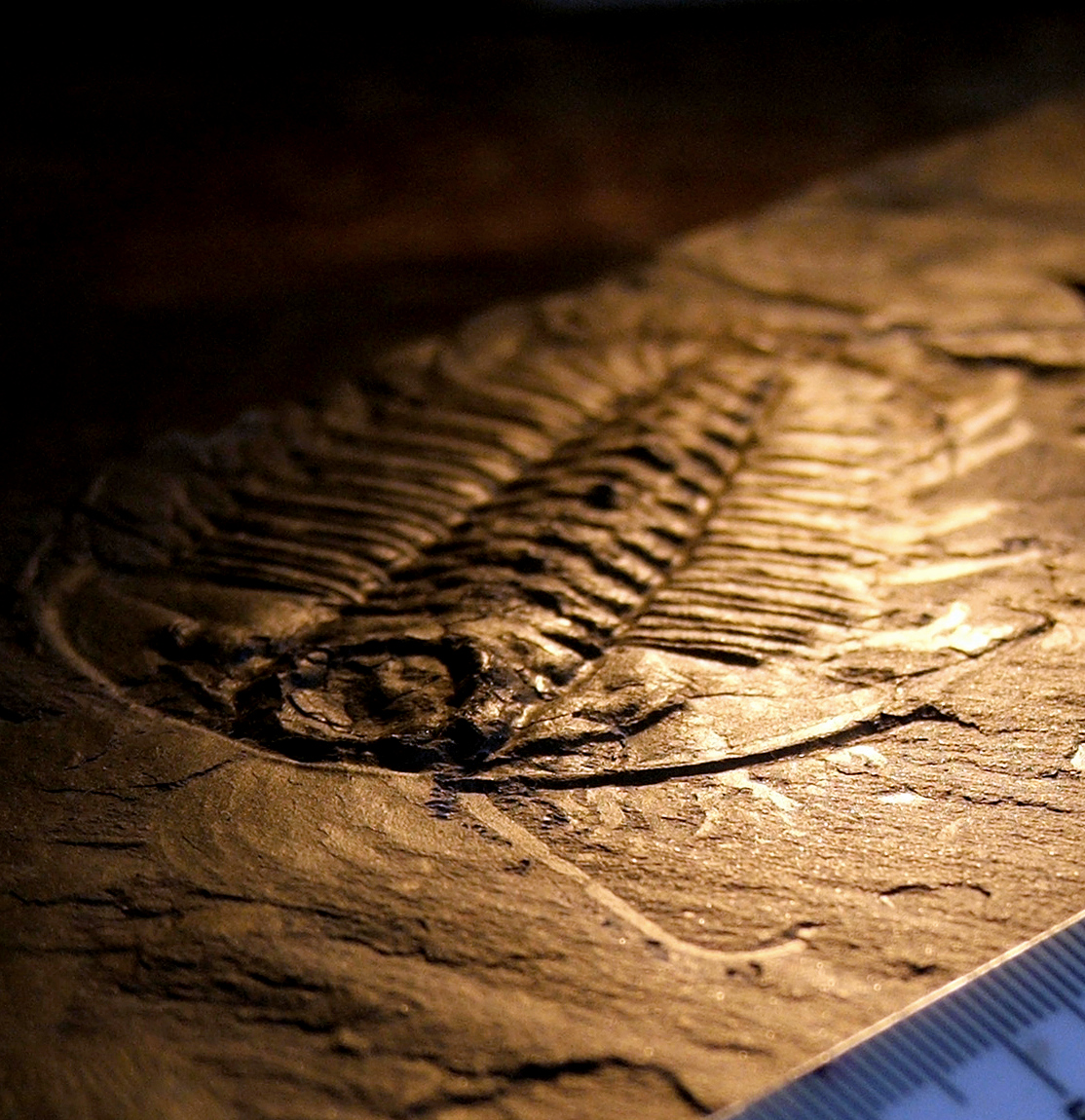
An exceptionally well preserved Olenoides serratus from the Burgess Shale. The antennae and legs are preserved as reflective carbon film

Olenoides was formerly known as Neolenus. Species of Kootenia are no longer considered different enough from those in Olenoides to warrant placement in a separate genus.

== Species ==
- O. nevadensis
- O. sassikaspa
- O. serratus
- O. superbus
- O. dawsoni (formerly placed in Kootenia)
- O. burgessensis (formerly placed in Kootenia)
- O. buttsi (unrecognized)
- O. convexus (unrecognized)
- O. incertus (unrecognized)
- O. pennsylvanicus (unrecognized)

== Description ==
Olenoides is an average size trilobite (up to 9 cm long), broadly oval in outline. Its cephalon is semi-circular. The glabella is parallel-sided, rounded at its front and almost reaches the anterior border. Narrow occular ridges curve backwards from the front of the glabella to the small, outwardly-bowed eyes. The librigenae narrow backward into straight, slender genal spines that reach as far as the third thorax segment. Thorax consists of seven segments that end in needle-like spines. pygidium) has six axial rings that decrease in size backwards and four or five pairs of rearward pointing marginal spines. Cephalon, thorax and pygidium are of approximately equal length.

Olenoides serratus is one of about twenty species of which the non-calcified parts are known, due to so-called soft tissue preservation. The antennae are the most anterior pair of appendages in trilobites. In O. serratus, these are attached about halfway the immediately adjacent to the hypostome, and appear from the dorsal side under the cephalon in front of the side of the glabella. They were flexible, having a tubular shape that became narrower towards anterior and composed of between 40 and 50 segments that are each shorter than wide. Olenoides serratus is the only known trilobite with cerci, uniramous appendages on ventral side of last pygidial segment, and these are shaped like the antennas.

== See also ==
- Paleobiota of the Burgess Shale
