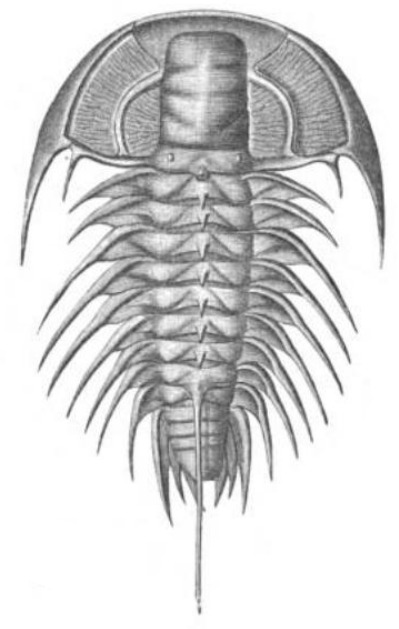
- Zacanthoides typicalis by C.D Walcott (1886)

Scientific classification
- Domain: Eukaryota
- Kingdom: Animalia
- Phylum: Arthropoda
- Clade: †Artiopoda
- Class: †Trilobita
- Order: †Corynexochida
- Family: †Zacanthoididae
- Genus: †Zacanthoides; Walcott, 1888

= Zacanthoides =

Zacanthoides is an extinct Cambrian genus of corynexochid trilobite. It was a nektobenthic predatory carnivore. Its remains have been found in Canada (British Columbia, especially in the Burgess Shale, and Newfoundland), Greenland, Mexico, and the United States (Alaska, Nevada, Utah, Vermont, and Idaho for which Z. idahoensis is named). Its major characteristics are a slender exoskeleton with 9 thoracic segments, pleurae with long spines, additional spines on the axial rings, and a pygidium that is considerably smaller than its cephalon.

== Species ==
- Zacanthoides idahoensis
- Zacanthoides kelsayae
- Zacanthoides romingeri (type species)
- Zacanthoides holopygus (unrecognized)
- Zacanthoides gilberti (unrecognized)

== Synonyms ==
Embolimus is a synonym.
