= Fuchouia =

Scientific classification
- Kingdom: Animalia
- Phylum: Arthropoda
- Clade: †Artiopoda
- Class: †Trilobita
- Order: †Corynexochida
- Family: †Dolichometopidae
- Genus: †Fuchouia; Resser & Endo, 1935

Extinct genus of trilobites

Fuchouia is an extinct genus of trilobite in the family Dolichometopidae. There are about 11 described species in Fuchouia.

== Species ==
These 11 species belong to the genus Fuchouia:

- † Fuchouia bulba Peng et al., 2004
- † Fuchouia chiai Lu, 1957
- † Fuchouia elongata Lu & Qian, 1974
- † Fuchouia kuruktagensis Zhang, 1981
- † Fuchouia manchuriensis (Walcott)
- † Fuchouia oratolimba Yang, 1977
- † Fuchouia prompta (Zhou, 1974)
- † Fuchouia quadrata Endo & Resser
- † Fuchouia quadratoglabella Yang et al., 1993
- † Fuchouia sixinensis Peng et al., 2004
- † Parafuchouia prompta (Zhou, 1974)
