= Abakania =

Abakania Temporal range: Botomian

Scientific classification
- Kingdom: Animalia
- Phylum: Arthropoda
- Clade: †Artiopoda
- Class: †Trilobita
- Order: †Corynexochida
- Family: †Corynexochidae
- Genus: †Abakania; Poletaeva, 1973

Species
- A. superba Poletaeva, 1973 (type); A. crassa Romanenko, 1999; A. usitata

Genus of trilobites

Abakania is an extinct genus of corynexochid trilobite in the family Corynexochidae. It lived during the Botomian stage, which lasted from approximately 524 to 518.5 million years ago. This faunal stage was part of the Cambrian Period.

== Distribution ==
- A. superba occurs in the Lower Cambrian of the Russian Federation (Botomian, Sanashtykgol Spring, Sanashtykgol Formation, Altai-Sayan region, 49.4° N, 136.4° E).
- A. crassa is present in the Lower Cambrian of the Russian Federation (Botomian, Kiya River section, Poliellaspis-zone, Usa Formation, Kemorovo, Kuznetsk Alatau, 56.0° N, 88.0° E).
