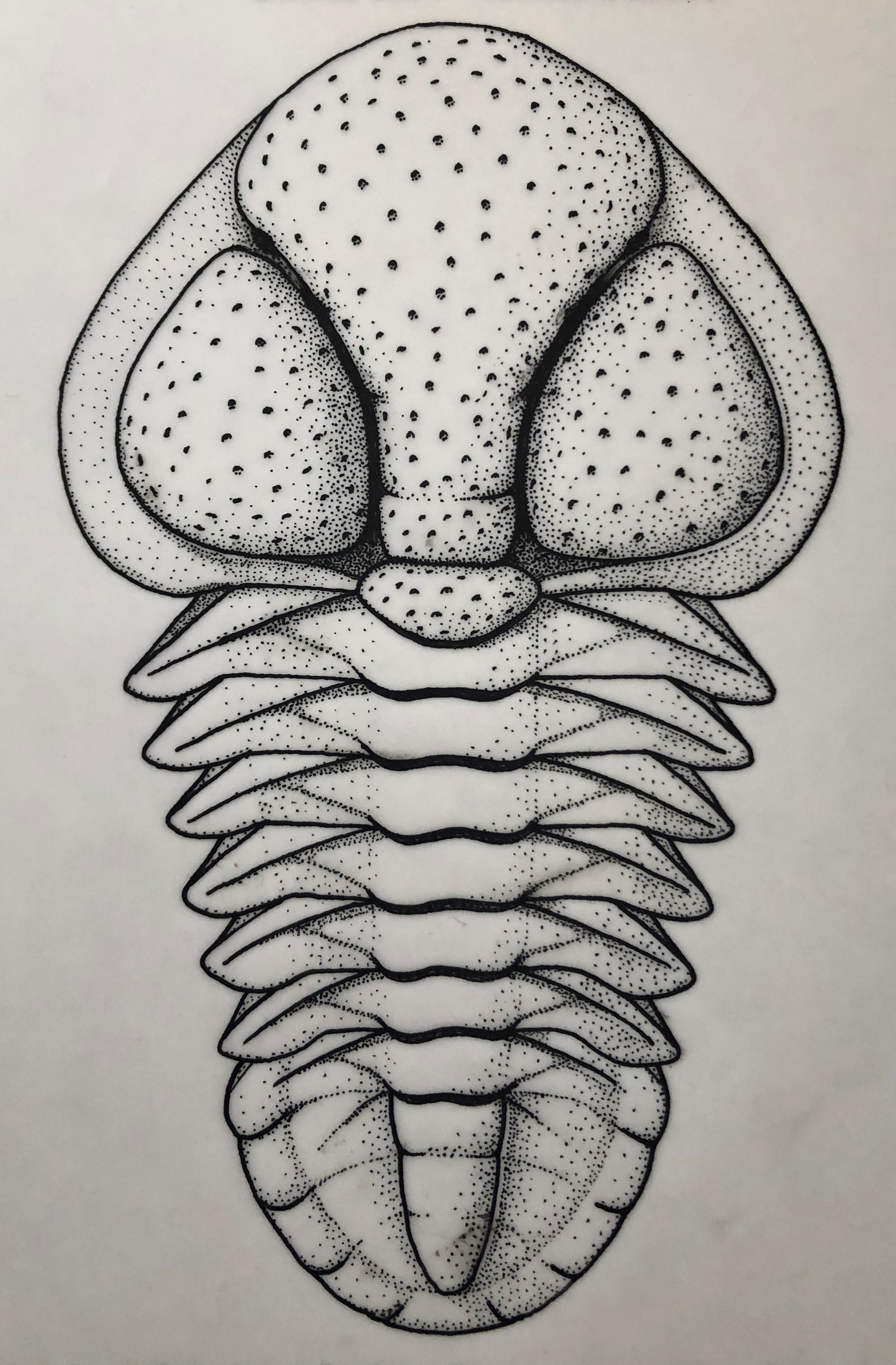

Scientific classification
- Kingdom: Animalia
- Phylum: Arthropoda
- Clade: †Artiopoda
- Class: †Trilobita
- Order: †Corynexochida
- Family: †Corynexochidae
- Genus: †Acontheus; Angelin, 1851

= Acontheus =

Acontheus Temporal range: Cambrian

Extinct genus of trilobites

Acontheus is a genus of trilobites belonging to the family Corynexochidae, order Corynexochida, and is geographically widespread having been recorded from middle Cambrian strata in Sweden, Newfoundland, Germany, Siberia, Antarctica, Queensland, China and Wales.

Acontheus appears confined to the Drumian and Guzhangian Stages, uppermost two of three Stages subdividing the middle Cambrian Miaolingian Series and, if species assignments are correct, the genus ranges in terms of the Scandinavian sequence from at least the Hypagnostus parvifrons Biozone in Wales to the Lejopyge laevigata Biozone at various locations elsewhere.

== Taxonomy ==
Acontheus has been placed in the subfamily Acontheinae (See Cotton, 2001, p. 194).

Cotton (op. cit.) also erected Tribe HARTSHILLINI within the Acontheinae to accommodate the highly derived genera Hartshillia Illing, 1916 and Hartshillina Lake, 1940.

Öpik (1982, p. 77) placed Acontheinae in the Dolichometopidae “by virtue of the similarities in pygidial structure between Fuchouia (Dolichometopidae) and Acontheus tenebrarum". However, Acontheus tenebrarum, Öpik (1982, pl. 32, fig. 5) from a late part of the V-Creek Limestone of Queensland and Zone of Doryagnostus notalibrae (= the Zone of Pytchagnostus punctuosus associated with Goniagnostus nathorsti) has since been excluded from the genus (Jago et al.., 2011).

== Diagnosis ==
Small heteropygous Corynexochidae lacking eyes and dorsal sutures (Westergärd, 1950, p. 9; Hutchinson, 1962, p. 109, Pl. 16, figures 8a-b, 9; Jago et al.., 2011, p. 29), although according to some authors including species with proparian sutures and possibly small palpepral lobes (see Remarks). Cephalon slightly parabolic in outline with rounded or acute genal angles; genae convex, subcircular to subtriangular in outline; lateral borders wide. Cephalic exoskeleton punctate or smooth. Thorax of 6 segments in species illustrated; pleurae bent strongly downwards abaxially, tips sharply rounded; pleural furrows straight, linked to posterior corners of axial rings by shallower oblique furrows. Axial furrows indistinctly defined. Pygidial axis composed of three (or four?) rings and a terminal piece. Pleural fields usually separated by axis; four pairs of pleural or interpleural furrows extend to margin; border broad with uniform convexities; margin entire.

Genus Acontheus Angelin, 1851 [= Aneucanthus Angelin 1854 (Obj.); Aneuacanthus Barrande, 1856 (Obj.)].

Characteristics of Acontheus are as for the subfamily.

Type species: By monotypy, A. acutangulus Angelin, 1851, from the Zone of Solenopleura s.l. brachymetopa (Andrarum Limestone), Andrarum, Scania (species redescribed and assigned to new subfamily Acontheinae by Westergård, 1950, p. 9, pl.18, figs.4-6).

== Other species currently assigned ==
The genus needs revision and discovery of new material may lead to reassignment of certain species.

- Acontheus cf. acutangulus, from the Guzhangian (probably lower Lejopyge laevigata Zone), Northern Victoria Land, Antarctica (Jago et al. 2011).
- Acontheus inarmatus, from the Paradoxides davidis Zone, southeastern Newfoundland (Hutchinson, 1962).
- Acontheus inarmatus minutus, from the Drumian Stage, Franconian Forest (German: Frankenwald), Germany. (Sdzuy, 2000; Geyer, 2010).
- Acontheus patens, from the late middle Cambrian of Siberia (Lazarenko, 1965).
- Acontheus sp. nov. (figured above), from the Hypagnostus parvifrons Biozone (Menevia Formation) of Porth-y-rhaw, St. David's, Wales (mentioned by Cotton, 2001, p. 170, and listed Tables 1 & 2 and Text Figs. 2 & 3; also recorded from Locs. PR-4 & PR-13 of Rees et al., 2014, pp. 26, 27). According to Westergärd (1950, p. 9) the pygidium of A. acutangulus is apparently almost as large as its cephalon, whereas A. sp. nov. is distinctly heteropygous.
- Acontheus burkeanus, from the Lejopyge laevigata I Zone of Queensland, Australia (Öpik, 1961).
- Acontheus rusticus Repina (in Repina et al., 1975, p. 131, pl. 15, figs. 12–15) and A. verus Repina (in Repina et al. 1975, p. 132, pl. 16, figs. 1–3) from the Middle Cambrian of Turkestan may be more appropriately assigned to Corynexochella Suvorova, 1964, based on features of their cranidia (according to Dean and Özgül, 1994, p. 15).
- Acontheus limbatus Egorova (in Egorova et al., 1982) is excluded and has been reallocated to Clavigellus [Type species, C. annulus Geyer (1994, p. 1314, fig. 6)].

== Ontogeny ==
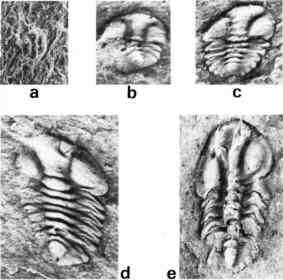
Ontogenetic stages of Acontheus from the Menevia Formation (H. parvifrons Biozone) of Porth-y-rhaw, St. David's, Wales: (a) Protaspis; (b) Meraspis degree 1; (c) Meraspis degree 2; (d) & (e) Holaspides with six thoracic segments.

Growth stages of Acontheus from the Menevia Formation (H. parvifrons Biozone) of Porth-y-rhaw, St. David's, are housed in the National Museum of Wales, Cardiff - collection prefix 80.34G.

== Remarks ==
Hutchinson (1962, p. 109) noted that the ‘cranidium’ of A. inarmatus resembles that of the much larger Acontheus acutangulus Angelin, but differs in that the glabella is more strongly expanded frontally, glabellar furrows are weaker, genal spines are lacking (unless a marginal suture had removed the posterolateral border with genal spine) and the glabella and cheeks are punctate rather than smooth. He also credibly remarked that “according to modern usage, these differences are great enough to warrant generic distinction between the two forms” but nevertheless preferred to retain them in the same genus. Opik (1982, p. 77) remarked that “Acontheus inarmatus Hutchinson, 1962 from Newfoundland and A. patens Lazarenko, 1965 from East Siberia are congeneric and distinguished by rounded (not spinose) cephalic corners” and, that “at all events the absence of eyes in Acontheus justifies an independent status for its subfamily”. This therefore places A. patens in the same clan as A. inarmatus, A. inarmatus minutus and A. sp. nov.

The cephalon of Acontheus sp. nov. particularly resembles that of A. inarmatus, but differs in having larger genae and the glabella less expanded frontally; in A. inarmatus the maximum glabellar width is approximately twice that of each gena (tr.) whereas in the Welsh form the corresponding ratio numbers between 1.5 and 1.75. Punctation of the exoskeleton is also slightly less coarse than in A. inarmatus, and the occipital ring is less elevated and without a median node. The thorax and pygidium of A. inarmatus are unknown.

A. inarmatus minutus Sdzuy (2000, pl.3 fig. 5; Heuse et al., p. 113. Fig. 4, illustration 16), possibly based on an immature specimen, is clearly related to both A. inarmatus and A. sp. nov.; the subspecies especially resembles A. inarmatus in the marked forward expansion of its glabella and small genae, but from the illustrations there is no clear evidence of lateral glabellar furrows as seen in Hutchinson's species. A. sp. nov. has larger genae and the glabella less expanded frontally than in minutus.

The pygidial axis in Acontheus cf. acutangulus (Jago et al., 2011, fig. 7, N-S) is narrower (tr.) than in the Swedish species and terminates slightly short of the posterior border furrow, whereas in both A. acutangulus Angelin, 1851 and A. sp. nov., the axis actually meets the border furrow and separates the pleural fields, as also observed in Clavigellus annulus Geyer (1994, figs. 6–8).

In their ‘Revised diagnosis’ of Acontheus, Jago et al. (2011, p. 29) stated that pygidial pleural furrows are “wide, deep, extend to border with marked posterior deflection where they cross border furrow. Interpleural furrows effaced”. In Acontheus sp. nov., however, it is clearly the interpleural furrows that give the pygidial border its lobed character and, without rearward deflection as observed in the type species, A. cf, acutangulus, Jago et al. (op. cit.) and Clavigellus annulatus, Geyer (op.cit.).

Jago et al. (op. cit., p. 31), also speculated “it is possible that A. burkeanus (Öpik, 1961, p.135, pl. 10, figs. 1-7; text-fig. 46) is a junior synonym of A. acutangulus, but better specimens of both species are required before this can be determined”. However, the assignation of “A”. bukeanus (Öpik, 1961, p. 135, pl. 10, figs. 1–7; text-fig. 46) from the Ptychagnostus cassis Zone [= S. brachymetopa Zone] of Queensland, is somewhat tenuous. The pygidium is of similar design to that of the type species and if compared on its own could be regarded as congeneric, differing specifically from other forms in having one more rib and axial ring. The cephalon, however, displays characteristics somewhat intermediate between Corynexochus Angelin, 1854, [= Karlia Walcott, 1889] and Acontheus . The fragmentary “cranidium” on which Öpik based his reconstruction (pl. 10, fig. 1) appears to possess a straight lateral margin which he tentatively suggested to be a proparian suture that separates a narrow librigena. The specimen appears also to have an ocular ridge extending possibly to a small palpebral lobe, though Öpik did not represent eyes in his reconstruction (text-fig. 46). Perhaps these features represent a difference at the generic level that will be more apparent when better preserved material and other parts of the exoskeleton become known.
