= Hunanocephalus =

Hunanocephalus Temporal range: Early Botomian

Scientific classification
- Kingdom: Animalia
- Phylum: Arthropoda
- Clade: †Artiopoda
- Class: †Trilobita
- Order: †Corynexochida
- Family: †Oryctocephalidae
- Genus: †Hunanocephalus; Lee, 1963

Extinct genus of trilobites

Hunanocephalus is an extinct genus from a well-known class of fossil marine arthropods, the trilobites. It lived during the early part of the Botomian stage, which lasted from approximately 524 to 518.5 million years ago. This faunal stage was part of the Cambrian Period.
