= Sinijanella =

Sinijanella Temporal range: Botomian

Scientific classification
- Domain: Eukaryota
- Kingdom: Animalia
- Phylum: Arthropoda
- Class: †Trilobita
- Order: †Corynexochida
- Family: †Dolichometopidae
- Genus: †Sinijanella; Repina, 1965

Genus of trilobites

Sinijanella is a genus of corynexochid trilobites that lived during the early part of the Botomian stage of the Cambrian Period. , which lasted from approximately 524 to 518.5 million years ago.
