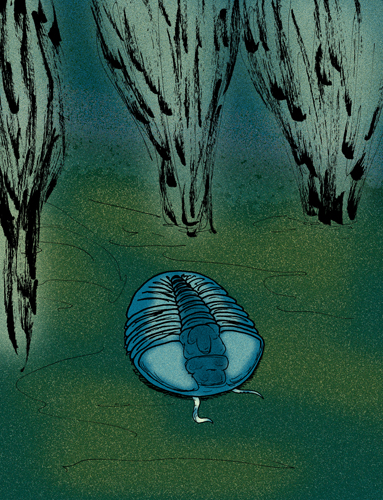
- artist's reconstruction

Scientific classification
- Domain: Eukaryota
- Kingdom: Animalia
- Phylum: Arthropoda
- Class: †Trilobita
- Order: †Corynexochida
- Family: †Dolichometopidae (?)
- Genus: †Hanburia; Walcott, 1916
- Species: †H. gloriosa

Binomial name
- †Hanburia gloriosa Walcott, 1916

= Hanburia gloriosa =

Hanburia gloriosa Temporal range: Burgess Shale

Extinct genus of trilobites

Hanburia gloriosa is a corynexochid trilobite known from the Middle Cambrian Burgess Shale. Four specimens of Hanburia gloriosa are known from the Greater Phyllopod bed, where they comprise < 0.1% of the community.
