= Nehanniaspis =

Nehanniaspis Temporal range: Late Atdabanian

Scientific classification
- Domain: Eukaryota
- Kingdom: Animalia
- Phylum: Arthropoda
- Class: †Trilobita
- Order: †Corynexochida
- Family: †Edelsteinaspididae
- Genus: †Nehanniaspis; Fritz, 1972

Nehanniaspis is an extinct genus from a well-known class of fossil marine arthropods, the trilobites. Nehanniaspis lived during the late Atdabanian stage, which lasted during the early part of the Cambrian Period, approximately 524 to 530 million years ago
