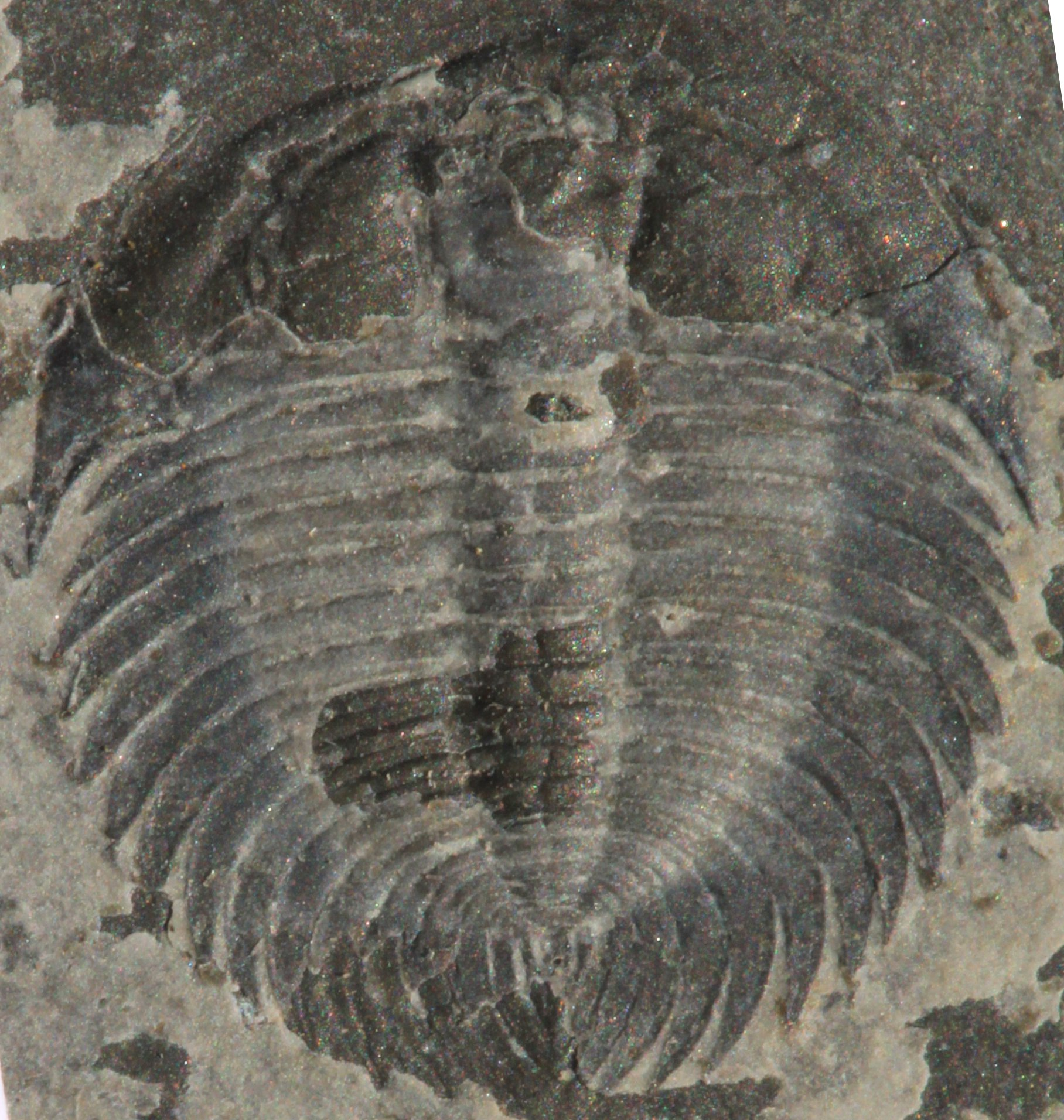
- Changaspis elongata, from China.

Scientific classification
- Kingdom: Animalia
- Phylum: Arthropoda
- Clade: †Artiopoda
- Class: †Trilobita
- Order: †Corynexochida; Kobayashi, 1935

Suborders
- Corynexochina; Illaenina; Leiostegiina

= Corynexochida =

Corynexochida Temporal range: Early Cambrian – Late Devonian, 520–372 Ma

Extinct order of trilobites

Corynexochida is an order of trilobites that lived from the Lower Cambrian to the Late Devonian. Like many of the other trilobite orders, Corynexochida contains many species with widespread characteristics.

== Description ==
The middle region of the cephalon (the glabella) is typically elongate, with the sides often spreading forward (pestle-shaped). Some species have glabellae that are effaced, meaning they are smooth and show little detail. The glabellar furrows (when not effaced) typically have a splayed arrangement. In most species, the hind pair on either side of the cephalon become spines that point sharply backwards, and the spinose tips of the anterior pairs of thoracic segments tend to become more and more forward directed toward the pygidium. The eyes are typically large. Pygidia are typically large, competing in size with the cephalon in some species.

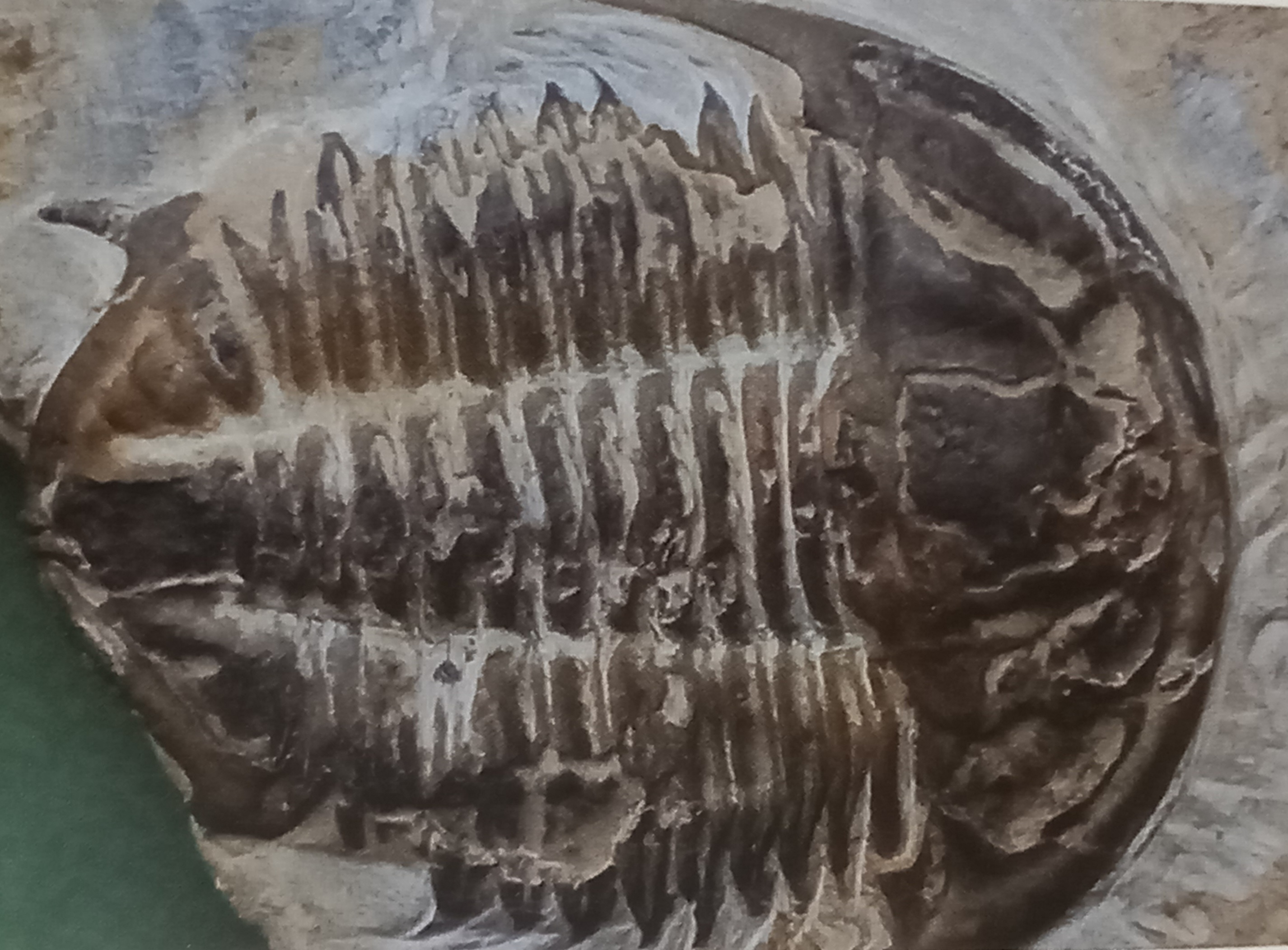
Fossil Prochuangia from the Cambrian period of Darnjal Formation, Tabas, Iran

The tips of the thoracic segments of many Corynexochida species are spine-like (though in some species they are flush with the sides and smooth). The thorax can have 2-12 segments (rarely more), but they more typically have 7–8.

== Taxonomy ==
=== Corynexochina ===
- Corynexochidae

Abakania, Acontheus, Bonnaspis, Chatiania, Clavigellus, Corynexochella, Corynexochina, Corynexochus, Eochatiana, Eocorynexochus, Hartshillia, Hartshillina, Milaspis, Miranella, Olinaspis, Sanaschtykgolia, Shivelicus, Trinia.

- Dinesidae

Amginoerbia, Botomella, Chakasskia, Chakasskiella, Compsocephalus, Densocephalus, Dilataspis, Dinesus, Erbia, Erbiella, Erbina, Erbiopsidella, Erbiopsis, Ghwaiella, Paraerbia, Piriforma, Pokrovskiella, Proerbia, Pseudoerbia, Pseudoerbiopsis, Rondocephalus, Tingyuania, Tollaspis, Tumulina.

- Dokimocephalidae

Acrocephalina, Alekcinella, Anemocephalus, Anuloides, Apachia, Bellaspidella, Bellaspis, Beothuckia, Burnetiella, Calocephalites, Chalfontia, Conaspis, Crusoiina, Deckera, Dellea, Delleana, Didwudina, Dokimocephalus, Fastigaspis, Glyptometopsis, Glyptometopus, Iddingsia, Jingxiania, Kindbladia, Kiowaia, Kyphocephalus, Lorrettina, Obrucheviaspis, Pinctus, Plakhinella, Pseudosaratogia, Puanella, Ritella, Saimachia, Sulcocephalus, Taenicephalina, Tatulaspis, Tchuostachia, Whittingtonella, Wilsonarella, Wuhuia, Yangweizhouia.

- Dolichometopidae

Aegunaspis, Amphoton, Anoria, Asperocare, Athabaskia, Athabaskiella, Atypicus, Basanellus, Bathyuriscidella, Bathyuriscus, Borovikovia, Centonella, Chilometopus, Chilonorria, Clavaspidella, Corynexochides, Deiradonyx, Dolicholeptus, Dolichometopsis, Dolichometopus, Drozdoviella, Erratobalticus, Ezhuangia, Fuchouia, Glossopleura, ?Granularaspis, Guraspis, ?Hanburia, Hemirhodon, Horonastes, Itydeois, Kannoriella, Klotziella, Lianhuashania, Mendospidella, Neopoliellina, Parapoliella, Poliella, Poliellaspidella, Poliellaspis, Poliellina, Politinella, Polypleuraspis, Prosymphysurus, Pseudamphoton, Ptannigania, Saimixiella, Sestrostega, Shanghaia, Sinijanella, Suvorovaaspis, Undillia, Zhenpingaspis.

- Dorypygidae

Atdabanella, Basocephalus, Bonnaria, Bonnia, Bonniella, Bonnima, Bonnioides, Bonniopsis, Dorypygaspis, Dorypyge, Dorypygina, Dorypygoides, Duyunia, Fordaspis, Hicksia, Holteria, Holyoakia, Jiuquania, Kharausnurica, Kootenia, Kooteniella, Kooteniellina, Kootenina, Liokootenia, Mengzia, Metakootenia, Namiolenoides, Neolenus, Ogygopsis, Olenoides, Paraolenoides, Popigaia, Prokootenia, Protypus, Pulvillaspis, Rabutina, Saryaspis, Shipaiella, Strettonia, Tabatopygellina, Tadjikia, Tienzhuia, Tolanaspis.

- Edelsteinaspididae

Alacephalus, Edelsteinaspis, Gelasene, Keeleaspis, Labradoria, Labradorina, Laticephalus, Litaspis, Nehanniaspis, Neoredlichina, Nodiceps, Paleofossus, Polliaxis, Torosus, Venosus.

- Jakutidae

Argasalina, Bathyuriscellus, Bathyuriscopsis, Daldynia, Gibscherella, Jakutus, Janshinicus, Jucundaspis, Judaiella, Kobdus, Lenaspis, Malykania, Manaspis, Prouktaspis, Uktaspis, Vologdinaspis.

- Oryctocephalidae

Arthricocephalus, Balangia, Barklyella, Cheiruroides, Curvoryctocephalus, Duodingia, Duyunaspis, Eoryctocephalus, Euarthricocephalus, Feilongshania, Haliplanktos, Hunanocephalus, Kunshanaspis, Lancastria, Metabalangia, Metarthricocephalus, Microryctocara, Neocheiruroides, Opsiosoryctocephalus, Oryctocara, Oryctocephalina, Oryctocephalites, Oryctocephaloides, Oryctocephalops, Oryctocephalus, Oryctometopus, Ovatoryctocara, Paleooryctocephalus, Parachangaspis, Paracheiruroides, Protoryctocephalus, Sandoveria, Shabaella, Taijiangocephalus, Teljanzella, Tonkinella, Udjanella.

- Zacanthoididae

Albertella, Albertellina, Albertelloides, Chuchiaspis, Danjiangella, Delamarina, Eozacanthoides, Fieldaspis, Mendogaspis, Mexicaspis, Micmaecopsis, Panxinella, Paralbertella, Parkaspis, Prozacanthoides, Pseudozacanthopsis, Ptarmiganoides, Qingzhenaspis, Stephenaspis, Thoracocare, Tianshanocephalus, Ursinella, Vanuxernella, Xuzhouia, Zacanthoides, Zacanthopsina, Zacanthopsis.

=== Illaenina ===
- Illaenidae

Alloillaenus, Bumastoides, Dysplanus, Ectillaenus, Harpillaenus, Hyboaspis, Illaenus, Nanillaenus, Ninglangia, Octillaenus, Ordosaspis, Parillaenus, Platillaenus, Ptilillaenus, Quadratillaenus, Snajdria, Spinillaenus, Stenopareia, Trigoncekovia, Ulugtella, Vysocania, Wuchuanella, Zbirovia, Zdicella, Zetillaenus.

- Panderiidae

Hemibarrandia, Ottenbyaspis, Panderia, Pogrebovites.

- Styginidae

Alceste, Altaepeltis, Amphoriops, Ancyropyge, Andegavia, Arctipeltis, Australoscutellum, Avascutellum, Bojoscutellum, Boreoscutellum, Breviscutellum, Bronteopsis, Brontocephalina, Brontocephalus, Bubupeltina, Bumastella, Bumastus, Calycoscutellum, Cavetia, Cekovia, Chichikaspis, Chugaevia, Ciliscutellum, Cornuscutellum, Craigheadia, Cybantyx, Decoroscutellum, Delgadoa, Dentaloscutellum, Dulanaspis, Ekwanoscutellum, Eobronteus, Eokosovopeltis, Eoscutellum, Exastipyx, Excetra, Failleana, Flexiscutellum, Goldillaenoides, Goldillaenus, Hallanta, Hidascutellum, Illaenoides, Illaenoscutellum, Izarnia, Japonoscutellum, Kirkdomina, Kobayashipeltis, Kolihapeltis, Kosovopeltis, Kotysopeltis, Lamproscutellum, Leioscutellum, Ligiscus, Liolalax, Litotix, Meitanillaenus, Meridioscutellum, Meroperix, Metascutellum, Microscutellum, Mulciberaspis, Neoscutellum, Octobronteus, Opoa, Ottoaspis, Paracybantyx, Paralejurus, Paraphillipsinella, Perischoclonus, Phillipsinella, Planiscutellum, Platyscutellum, Poroscutellum, Protobronteus, Protostygina, Pseudoeobronteus, Pseudostygina, Quyuania, Radioscutellum, Raymondaspis, Rhaxeros, Sangzhiscutellum, Scabriscutellum, Scutellum, Septimopeltis, Spiniscutellum, Stygina, Styginella, Tenuipeltis, Thaleops, Theamataspis, Thomastus, Thysanopeltella, Thysanopeltis, Tosacephalus, Turgicephalus, Unicapeltis, Uraloscutellum, Waisfeldaspis, Weberopeltis, Xyoeax.

- Tsinaniidae

Blandiaspis, Dictyella, Esseigania, Guluheia, Jiwangshania, Leiaspis, Lonchopygella, Paradictyites, Shergoldia, Taipaikia, Tsinania, Zhujia.

=== Leiostegiina ===
- Cheilocephalidae

Aksayaspis, Cheilocephalus, Emsurella, Lecanoaspis, Macelloura, Oligometopus, Parakoldinia, Pseudokingstonia, Pseudokoldinia.

- Illaenuridae

Ambonolium, Illaenurus, Lecanopyge, Minicephalus, Olenekella, Platydiamesus, Polyariella, Rasettaspis, Rasettia, Resseraspis, Tatonaspis, Yurakia.

- Kaolishaniidae

Anhuiaspis, Ceronocare, Donggouia, Eokaolishania, Eoniansuyia, Eotingocephalus, Hapsidocare, Hemikaolishania, Kabutocrania, Kaolishania, Kaolishaniella, Liaotropis, Mansuyia, Mansuyites, Mimana, Palacorona, Palemansuyia, Parakaolishania, Pararnansuyella, Peichiashania, Prolloydia, Shidiania, Taianocephalus, Tangjiaella, Tingocephalus, Tugurelluin, Wayaonia.

- Leiostegiidae

Aedotes, Aethochuangia, Agerina, Alloleiostegium, Ampullatocephalina, Annamitella, Aspidochuangia, Baoshanaspis, Brackebuschia, Cholopilus, Chosenia, Chuangia, Chuangiella, Chuangina, Chuangioides, Chuangiopsis, Chuangites, Constrictella, Eochuangia, Euleiostegium, Evansaspis, Gonicheirurus, Iranaspis, Iranochuangia, Jinanaspis, Kepisis, Leiostegium, Leptochuangia, Linguchuangia, Lloydia, Madaoyuites, Manitouella, Marcouella, Meropalla, Paraaojia, Paraleiostegium, Paraonychopyge, Paraszechuanella, Perischodory, Plethopeltella, Pseudocalymene, Pseudoleiostegium, Reubenella, Sailoma, Shanchengziella, Sobovaspis, Szechuanella, Tinaspis, Xinhuangaspis, Yaopuia, Yarmakaspis, Yinjiangia, Prochuangia

- Ordosiidae

Delinghaspis, Kontrastina, Nidanshania, Ordosia, Paralevisia, Plesioinouyella, Poshania, Pseudotaitzuia, Taitzuia, Taitzuina, Tylotaitzuia, Wanshania, Xundiania.

- Pagodiidae

Arcifimbria, Bienella, Datsonia, Girandia, Idamea, Lichengaspis, Lotosoides, Oreadella, Pagodia, Pagodioides, Phoreotropis, Prochuangia, Ptychopleurites, Sagitaspis, Sagitoides, Seletoides, Wittekindtia.

- Shirakiellidae

Neoshirakiella, Pseudotaishania, Shirakiella, Yantaiella.
