= 2025 in arthropod paleontology =

In 2025, several new arthropod fossil taxa, including arachnids, crustaceans, trilobites, and other arthropods (for insects, see 2025 in paleoentomology) were announced or described. Other significant arthropod paleontological discoveries and events also occurred in 2025.

== Chelicerates ==
=== Arachnids ===
==== Amblypygi ====
Name	Novelty	Status	Authors	Age	Type locality	Location	Notes	Image
Phrynus luisdearmasi	Sp. nov	Valid	Dunlop & Bartel	Miocene (probably Burdigalian)	Dominican amber	Dominican Republic	A species of Phrynus.	
Phrynus poinari	Nom. nov	Valid	Dunlop & Bartel	Miocene	Mexican amber	Mexico	A species of Phrynus; a replacement name for Phrynus mexicana Poinar & Brown (2004).	

==== Araneae ====
Name	Novelty	Status	Authors	Age	Type locality	Location	Notes	Image
Balticonesticus rectus	Sp. nov	Valid	Wunderlich	Eocene	Baltic amber	Europe (Baltic Sea region)	A scaffold web spider.	
Baltplanarchaea	Gen. et comb. nov	Valid	Wunderlich	Eocene	Baltic amber	Europe (Baltic Sea region)	A spider belonging to the family Planarchaeidae. The type species is "Planarchaea" oblonga Wunderlich (2017).	
Burmesarchaea spinicaput	Sp. nov	Valid	Wunderlich	Cretaceous	Kachin amber	Myanmar	A spider belonging to the family Archaeidae.	
Cornuanandrus scutatus	Sp. nov	Valid	Wunderlich	Eocene	Baltic amber	Europe (Baltic Sea region)	A spider belonging to the family Synotaxidae.	
Furczarqa	Gen. et sp. nov	Valid	Wunderlich	Cretaceous	Kachin amber	Myanmar	A spider belonging to the family Zarqaraneidae. The type species is F. incerta.	
Fushunpalpimanus	Gen. et sp. nov	Valid	Wunderlich	Eocene	Fushun amber	China	A spider belonging to the family Palpimanidae. The type species is F. exuviae.	
Heteronesticus acuminatus	Sp. nov	Valid	Wunderlich	Eocene	Baltic amber	Europe (Baltic Sea region)	A scaffold web spider.	
Heteronesticus bitterfeldensis	Sp. nov	Valid	Wunderlich	Eocene	Bitterfeld amber	Germany	A scaffold web spider.	
Longthorax	Nom. nov	Valid	Wunderlich	Cretaceous	Kachin amber	Myanmar	A spider belonging to the family Tetrablemmidae; a replacement name for Longithorax Wunderlich (2017).	
Microlininus	Nom. nov	Valid	Wunderlich	Eocene	Baltic amber	Europe (Baltic Sea region)	A replacement name for Microlinus Wunderlich (2004).	
?Mimetus flexuosus	Sp. nov	Valid	Wunderlich	Eocene	Baltic amber	Europe (Baltic Sea region)	A possible species of Mimetus.	
Parvispinina	Nom. nov	Valid	Wunderlich	Cretaceous	Kachin amber	Myanmar	A spider belonging to the family Zarqaraneidae; a replacement name for Parvispina Wunderlich (2015).	
Pectenzodarion	Gen. et sp. nov	Valid	Wunderlich	Eocene	Baltic amber	Europe (Baltic Sea region)	An ant spider. The type species is P. unicum.	
Planarchaea humilis	Sp. nov	Valid	Wunderlich	Cretaceous	Kachin amber	Myanmar	A spider belonging to the family Planarchaeidae.	
Planarchaea longipalpitibia	Sp. nov	Valid	Wunderlich	Cretaceous	Kachin amber	Myanmar	A spider belonging to the family Planarchaeidae.	
Planarchaea petersi	Sp. nov	Valid	Wunderlich	Cretaceous	Kachin amber	Myanmar	A spider belonging to the family Planarchaeidae.	
Planarchaea quinquespinae	Sp. nov	Valid	Wunderlich	Cretaceous	Kachin amber	Myanmar	A spider belonging to the family Planarchaeidae.	
Succinitaxus pusillus	Sp. nov	Valid	Wunderlich	Eocene	Baltic amber	Europe (Baltic Sea region)	A spider belonging to the family Synotaxidae.	
Succinitaxus strepitus	Sp. nov	Valid	Wunderlich	Eocene	Baltic amber Bitterfeld amber	Baltic Sea region Germany	A spider belonging to the family Synotaxidae.	

===== Spider research =====
- A female spider belonging to the genus Parvosegestria interpreted as preserved guarding her clutch of eggs and offspring partly free from their cover is described of a piece of Cretaceous Kachin amber by Wunderlich (2025).
- Córdova-Tabares, Estrada-Ruiz & Riquelme (2025) report the first discovery of a ray spider specimen in the Mexican amber.

==== Ixodida ====
Name	Novelty	Status	Authors	Age	Type locality	Location	Notes	Image
Amblyomma arawakan	Sp. nov	Valid	Chitimia-Dobler & Martins in Milde et al.	Miocene	Dominican amber	Dominican Republic	A hard tick, a species of Amblyomma.	

==== Pseudoscorpiones ====
Name	Novelty	Status	Authors	Age	Type locality	Location	Notes	Image
Echinochelifer	Gen. et sp. nov		Feng et al.	Cretaceous	Kachin amber	Myanmar	A member of the family Cheliferidae. The type species is E. curvatus.	
Lechytia finniae	Sp. nov		Hagen et al.	Late Cretaceous (Cenomanian)	Kachin amber	Myanmar	A species of Lechytia.	
Palaeochiridium	Gen. et sp. nov	Valid	Turbanov et al.	Cretaceous		Myanmar	A member of the family Pseudochiridiidae. The type species is P. insolitum.	

==== Sarcoptiformes ====
Name	Novelty	Status	Authors	Age	Type locality	Location	Notes	Image
Azarliodes	Gen. et comb. nov		Arillo & Gutiérrez	Early Cretaceous	Lebanese amber	Lebanon	A mite belonging to the family Neoliodidae; a new genus for "Neoliodes" andreneli Arillo et al. (2019).	
Histiogaster altilis	Sp. nov	Valid	Kolesnikov et al.	Eocene	Rovno amber	Ukraine	A species of Histiogaster.	
Paralycus ekaterinae	Sp. nov	Valid	Kolesnikov et al.	Eocene (Priabonian)	Rovno amber	Ukraine	A member of Oribatida belonging to the family Pediculochelidae.	
Paralycus primus	Sp. nov	Valid	Kolesnikov et al.	Late Cretaceous (Cenomanian)	Kachin amber	Myanmar	A member of Oribatida belonging to the family Pediculochelidae.	
Plesioglyphus	Gen. et sp. nov	Valid	Sendi et al.	Early Cretaceous (Barremian)	Lebanese amber	Lebanon	A member of the family Schizoglyphidae. The type species is P. lebanotermi.	

===== Sarcoptiform research =====
- Klimov et al. (2025) revise Protospeleorchestes pseudoprotacarus, Paraprotacarus hirsti and Palaeotydeus devonicus from the Devonian Rhynie chert (United Kingdom) and interpret them all as junior synonyms of Protacarus crani, assigned by the authors to the new family Protoacaridae within Endeostigmata; the authors also study the diversification timeline of acariform mites, and argue that the crown group of Acariformes originated during the Cambrian, at the time of colonization of lands by bryophytes.

==== Scorpiones ====
Name	Novelty	Status	Authors	Age	Type locality	Location	Notes	Image
Archaeoananteroides carusoi	Sp. nov	Valid	Lourenço in Lourenço & Velten	Cretaceous	Kachin amber	Myanmar	A scorpion belonging to the superfamily Buthoidea and the family Ananteridae.	
Betaburmesebuthus groehni	Sp. nov	Valid	Lourenço in Lourenço & Velten	Cretaceous	Probably Kachin amber	Myanmar	A scorpion belonging to the superfamily Buthoidea and the family Palaeoburmesebuthidae.	
Betaburmesebuthus petersi	Sp. nov	Valid	Lourenço in Lourenço & Velten	Cretaceous	Probably Kachin amber	Myanmar	A scorpion belonging to the superfamily Buthoidea and the family Palaeoburmesebuthidae.	
Burmesescorpiops wunpawng	Sp. nov	Valid	Lourenço, Dan & Zawgyi	Cretaceous	Kachin amber	Myanmar	A scorpion belonging to the family Palaeoeuscorpiidae.	
Cretaceoushormiops petersi	Sp. nov	Valid	Lourenço in Lourenço & Velten	Cretaceous	Kachin amber	Myanmar	A scorpion belonging to the family Protoischnuridae.	
Jeholia	Gen. et sp. nov	Valid	Xuan et al.	Early Cretaceous	Yixian Formation	China	A member of Buthida of uncertain affinities. The type species is J. longchengi.	
Palaeoburmesebuthus sarahmeyerae	Sp. nov	Valid	Lourenço in Lourenço & Velten	Cretaceous	Kachin amber	Myanmar	A scorpion belonging to the superfamily Buthoidea and the family Palaeoburmesebuthidae.	
Palaeobutheolus	Gen. et 2 sp. nov	Valid	Lourenço in Lourenço & Velten	Cretaceous	Kachin amber	Myanmar	A scorpion, possibly a member of the family Buthidae. The type species is P. andreschmidti; genus also includes P. staxi.	
Paratrilineatus	Gen. et sp. nov	Valid	Lourenço in Lourenço & Velten	Cretaceous	Kachin amber	Myanmar	A scorpion belonging to the superfamily Buthoidea and the family Palaeotrilineatidae. The type species is P. schmidti.	
Serratochaerilobuthus barbarae	Sp. nov	Valid	Lourenço & Velten	Cretaceous	Kachin amber	Myanmar		

===== Scorpion research =====
- Callaghan & Boyce (2025) argue that a footless posture does not provide strong support for an aquatic habitat in fossil scorpions by itself, interpret the fossil evidence as overall supporting terrestrial origin of total group of Scorpiones.
- Xuan et al. (2025) revise scorpions from the family Chaerilobuthidae known from the Cretaceous Kachin amber from Myanmar, reinterpret Chaeriloiurus and Serratochaerilobuthus as junior synonyms of the genus Chaerilobuthus, and rerank the family Chaerilobuthidae itself as a subfamily belonging to the family Pseudochactidae.

==== Trombidiformes ====
Name	Novelty	Status	Authors	Age	Type locality	Country	Notes	Images
Caeculus aeternus	Sp. nov		Porta et al.	Eocene	Baltic amber	Europe (Baltic Sea region)	A member of the family Caeculidae.	
Cretachyzeria	Gen. et sp. nov	Valid	Liu, Fan & Ren	Late Cretaceous (Cenomanian)	Kachin amber	Myanmar	A member of the family Chyzeriidae. The type species is C. macroseta.	
Punkochyzeria	Gen. et 3 sp. nov	Valid	Kolesnikov, Turbanov & Vorontsov	Cretaceous	Kachin amber	Myanmar	A member of the family Chyzeriidae. Genus includes new species P. minaevi, P. makolae and P. khoyi.	
Scleroerythraeus	Gen. et sp. nov		Costa et al.	Eocene	Baltic amber	Russia (Kaliningrad Oblast)	An erythraeid mite. Genus includes new species S. ferox.	

===== Trombidiform research =====
- New caeculid specimens, including the first fossil caeculid larva, are described from the Cretaceous Kachin amber from Myanmar by Gerbe et al. (2025).

==== Uropygi ====
Name	Novelty	Status	Authors	Age	Type locality	Country	Notes	Images
Mesothelyphonus xiaoae	Sp. nov		Wu et al.	Cretaceous	Kachin amber	Myanmar	A whip scorpion.	

==== Other arachnids ====
===== Other arachnid research =====
- Santos et al. (2025) describe fossil material of Gzhelian trigonotarbids: Aphantomartus sp. from the Bierzo Coalfield and Aphantomartus areolatus from the Villablino Coalfield (Spain), associated with plant remains indicating that the studied arachnids likely lived in humid evergreen forests.

=== Eurypterids ===
Name	Novelty	Status	Authors	Age	Type locality	Country	Notes	Images
Athenepterus	Gen. et comb. nov	Valid	Lamsdell	Silurian (Přídolí)		United Kingdom	A member of the family Hardieopteridae. The type species is "Eurypterus" megalops Salter (1859); genus also includes A. sigmoidalis (Kjellesvig-Waering, 1971).	
Barusopterus	Gen. et comb. nov	Valid	Lamsdell	Silurian (Ludlow)		United States (Indiana)	A member of Dolichopteroidea belonging to the family Strobilopteridae. The type species is "Onychopterus" limuloides Kjellesvig-Waering (1948).	
?Carcinosoma aurorae	Sp. nov	Valid	Van Roy, Richards & Ortega-Hernández	Ordovician (Tremadocian)	Fezouata Formation	Morocco		
Cruinnopterus	Gen. et comb. nov	Valid	Lamsdell	Silurian (Llandovery–Wenlock)		Canada (Ontario); United Kingdom	A member of the family Carcinosomatidae. The type species is "Eurypterus" scorpioides Woodward (1868); genus also includes C. scotica (Laurie, 1899).	
Hunanopterus	Fam. et gen. et comb. nov	Valid	Lamsdell	Silurian (Llandovery–Přídolí)		China	A member of the superfamily Pterygotoidea, the type genus of the new family Hunanopteridae. The type species is "Hughmilleria" wangi Tetlie, Selden & Ren (2007).	
Selkiepterella	Gen. et comb. nov	Valid	Lamsdell	Silurian (Llandovery–Přídolí)		United Kingdom	A member of the family Adelophthalmidae. The type species is "Himantopterus" lanceolata Salter (1856); genus also includes S. cephalaspis (Salter in Sedgwick and McCoy, 1855).	
Tigrisopterus	Gen. et sp. nov		Wang, Sun & Zhang	Devonian (Lochkovian)	Nagaoling Formation	China	A member of the family Carcinosomatidae. The type species is T. zengi.	
Waterstonopterus	Gen. et comb. nov	Valid	Lamsdell	Silurian (Llandovery–Wenlock)		United Kingdom; United States (Pennsylvania)	A member of the family Hardieopteridae. The type species is "Hardieopterus" lanarkensis Waterston (1979); genus also includes W. myops (Clarke, 1907).	

==== Eurypterid research ====
- Wang et al. (2025) revise Devonian pterygotid eurypterids from the Xiaxishancun Formation (Yunnan, China) and introduce a new nomenclature to define the cheliceral denticles of pterygotids.

=== Xiphosurans ===
Name	Novelty	Status	Authors	Age	Type locality	Country	Notes	Images
Ciurcalimulus	Gen. et sp. nov	Valid	Lamsdell	Silurian (Ludlow)	Wabash Formation	United States (Indiana)	The type species is C. discobolus.	
Lunataspis gundersoni	Sp. nov		Lamsdell et al.	Ordovician (Katian)	Big Hill Formation	United States (Michigan)	Bears an unusually elongated shovel-shaped prosoma with recurved spines.	

==== Xiphosuran research ====
- Evidence indicating that fusion of the opisthosomal segments happened once in the common ancestor to Xiphosura, while loss of visible segment boundaries happened several times during the xiphosuran evolution, is presented by Lamsdell & Ocon (2025).
- Bicknell et al. (2025) report an unusual Euproops danae specimen from the Late Carboniferous Mazon Creek Konservat-Lagerstätte whose prosomal surface bears numerous dimples, and conclude that these features likely reflect an algal or parasitic infestation sustained during the animal's final moult, representing the only such case known from the xiphosurid fossil record.

=== Other chelicerates ===
Name	Novelty	Status	Authors	Age	Type locality	Country	Notes	Images
Smotrychaspis	Gen. et sp. nov		Smith & Selden	Silurian (Homerian to Gorstian)	Ustya Formation	Ukraine	A synziphosurine chelicerate. The type species is S. kurtopleurae.	

==== Other chelicerate research ====
- Strausfeld, Andrew & Hirth (2025) report evidence of organization of prosoma and cerebrum of Mollisonia symmetrica similar to those observed in extant arachnids, and interpret Mollisonia as likely to be a stem-arachnid phylogenetically close to the arachnid crown group.
- Lustri et al. (2025) propose that chelicerates belonging to the family Offacolidae were suspension feeders.

== Crustaceans ==
=== Malacostracans ===
Name	Novelty	Status	Authors	Age	Type locality	Country	Notes	Images
Alahexapus	Gen. et comb. nov	Valid	Klompmaker et al.	Paleocene (Danian)	Clayton Formation	United States (Alabama)	A crab belonging to the family Hexapodidae. The type species is "Stevea" martini Feldmann, Schweitzer & Portell (2014).	
Alloranina	Gen. et sp. et comb. nov	Valid	Ferratges et al.	Eocene to Miocene	Serraduy Formation	Italy; Spain	A crab belonging to the family Raninidae. The type species is A. arjae; genus also includes "Ranina" pellattieroi de Angeli & Beschin (2011).	
Alonteucosia	Gen. et sp. nov	Valid	De Angeli & Marangon	Eocene		Italy	A crab belonging to the family Leucosiidae. The type species is A. hepatituberculata.	
Alphacheles	Gen. et comb. nov	Valid	Klompmaker et al.	Paleocene (Danian)	Porters Creek Formation	United States (Alabama)	A member of the family Ctenochelidae. The type species is "Callianassa" zeta Rathbun (1936).	
Alpheus indicus	Sp. nov	Valid	Amal, Kapur & Prasanna	Miocene (Burdigalian)	Quilon Formation	India	A species of Alpheus.	
Arcticocarcinus americanus	Sp. nov	Valid	Schweitzer	Eocene	Vincentown Formation	United States (New Jersey)	A crab belonging to the family Necrocarcinidae.	
Aridelocaris	Gen. et sp. nov		Schweitzer & Schram	Carboniferous (Tournaisian)		United States (Ohio)	A member of Phyllocarida belonging to the family Sairocarididae. The type species is A. ohioensis.	
Balticoniscus	Gen. et sp. nov	Valid	Kästle & Ludwig	Eocene	Prussian Formation (Baltic amber)	Poland	A woodlouse belonging to the group Crinocheta. The type species is B. walterludwigi.	
Bathypaguropsis alontensis	Sp. nov	Valid	De Angeli & Marangon	Eocene		Italy	A hermit crab belonging to the family Paguridae.	
Bittnerilia tuberculata	Sp. nov	Valid	Beschin & Checchi	Eocene		Italy	A crab belonging to the family Calappidae.	
Carpilius feldmanni	Sp. nov	Valid	Ferratges et al.	Eocene	Serraduy Formation	Spain	A crab, a species of Carpilius.	
Ceronnectes rugosus	Sp. nov	Valid	Ferratges et al.	Eocene	Serraduy Formation	Spain	A crab belonging to the family Cancridae.	
Costacopluma nicksabani	Sp. nov	Valid	Klompmaker et al.	Paleocene (Danian)	Clayton Formation	United States (Alabama)	A crab belonging to the family Retroplumidae.	
Crangopsis baljaffrayensis	Sp. nov	Valid	Clark	Carboniferous		United Kingdom	A member of Peracarida belonging to the group Mysidacea. Published online in 2026, but the issue date is listed as October 2025.	
Crangopsis carlopsensis	Sp. nov	Valid	Clark	Carboniferous		United Kingdom	A member of Peracarida belonging to the group Mysidacea. Published online in 2026, but the issue date is listed as October 2025.	
Cretapalibythus	Gen. et sp. nov	Valid	Charbonnier, Garassino & Brochet	Early Cretaceous (Aptian)		France	A furry lobster. The type species is C. moniquae.	
Cretatrizocheles rodfeldmanni	Sp. nov	Valid	Gašparič et al.	Early Cretaceous (Aptian or Albian)		Slovenia	A hermit crab belonging to the family Pylochelidae.	
?Diogenes jafrii	Sp. nov		Ossó et al.	Eocene	Drazinda Formation	Pakistan	Possibly a species of Diogenes.	
Distefania pimientai	Comb. nov	Valid	(Ferratges & Zamora in García-Penas et al.)	Early Cretaceous (Aptian)		Spain	A member of the family Dromiidae belonging to the subfamily Goniodromitinae; moved from Palaeodromites pimientai Ferratges & Zamora in García-Penas et al. (2023).	
Dysopodus	Gen. et sp. nov	Valid	Schädel et al.	Early Cretaceous (Barremian)		Lebanon	An isopod belonging to the group Cymothoida. The type species is D. gezei.	
Eocalcinus manfrinatoensis	Sp. nov	Valid	De Angeli & Marangon	Eocene		Italy	A hermit crab belonging to the family Diogenidae.	
Eocollinsius	Gen. et sp. nov	Valid	De Angeli & Coole	Eocene		Italy	A crab belonging to the family Chasmocarcinidae. The type species is E. albertii.	
Eohexapus simplex	Sp. nov	Valid	Ferratges et al.	Eocene	Serraduy Formation	Spain	A crab belonging to the family Hexapodidae.	
Eomunidopsis rigolleti	Sp. nov	Valid	Ossó et al.	Early Cretaceous (Aptian)	Forcall Formation	Spain	A member of the family Galatheidae.	
Eucalliaxiopsis alabamensis	Comb. nov	Valid	(Rathbun)	Paleocene (Danian)	Porters Creek Formation	United States (Alabama)	A member of the family Eucalliacidae; moved from Callianassa alabamensis Rathbun (1935).	
Eumorphia fabianmuelleri	Sp. nov	Valid	Charbonnier et al.	Middle Jurassic (Callovian)	Ornatenton Formation	Germany	A member of the family Mecochiridae.	
Feldmannicarcinus	Gen. et comb. et sp. nov	Valid	Schweitzer	Eocene	Castle Hayne Formation	United States (New Jersey; North Carolina)	A crab belonging to the family Tumidocarcinidae. The type species is "Glyphithyreus" sturgeoni Feldmann et al. (1998); genus also includes new species F. hajzeri.	
Galenopsis ossoi	Sp. nov	Valid	Ferratges et al.	Eocene	Serraduy Formation	Spain	A crab belonging to the family Pilumnidae.	
Garapitoplax	Gen. et comb. nov	Valid	Nyborg, Garassino & Vega	Paleocene		United States (California)	A crab belonging to the family Goneplacidae; a new genus for "Cyclocorystes" aldersoni Squires (1980).	
Grimothea nishioi	Comb. nov	Valid	(Karasawa)	Miocene		Japan	A species of Grimothea; moved from Munida nishioi Karasawa (1993).	
Grimothea ogaensis	Comb. nov	Valid	(Hatai & Kotaka)	Miocene		Japan	A species of Grimothea; moved from Kazuoia ogaensis Hatai & Kotaka (1970).	
Huescarina	Gen. et sp. et comb. nov	Valid	Ferratges et al.	Eocene	Serraduy Formation	Italy; Spain	A crab belonging to the family Raninidae. The type species is H. vanbakeli; genus also includes "Laeviranina" pulchra Beschin et al. (1998).	
Hyastenus bericus	Sp. nov	Valid	De Angeli & Marangon	Eocene		Italy	A species of Hyastenus.	
Hyphalocarcinus	Gen. et comb. nov	Valid	Schweitzer, Klompmaker & Luque	Paleocene		Mexico; United States (Alabama; Texas)	A crab belonging to the superfamily Carpilioidea and the family Palaeoxanthopsidae. The type species is "Dromilites" americana Rathbun (1935).	
Karumballichirus khadroensis	Comb. nov	Valid	(Hyžný & Charbonnier in Hyžný et al.)	Paleocene (Danian)	Khadro Formation	Pakistan	A member of Axiidea belonging to the family Callichiridae; moved from Neocallichirus khadroensis Hyžný & Charbonnier in Hyžný et al. (2016).	
Karumballichirus lakhraensis	Comb. nov	Valid	(Hyžný & Charbonnier in Hyžný et al.)	Paleocene (Thanetian)?–Eocene (Ypresian)	Lakhra Formation	Pakistan	A member of Axiidea belonging to the family Callichiridae; moved from Neocallichirus lakhraensis Hyžný & Charbonnier in Hyžný et al. (2016).	
Karumballichirus maximus	Comb. nov	Valid	(Milne-Edwards)	Holocene		Thailand	A member of Axiidea belonging to the family Callichiridae; moved from Callianassa maxima Milne-Edwards (1870).	
Laeviprosopon gignouxi	Comb. nov	Valid	(Van Straelen)	Early Cretaceous (Hauterivian)		France	A crab belonging to the family Homolidae; moved from Prosopon gignouxi Van Straelen (1928).	
Linuparus petrocorii	Sp. nov		Charbonnier et al.	Late Jurassic (Kimmeridgian)		France	A species of Linuparus	
Liocarcinus tridentatus	Sp. nov	Valid	Ferratges et al.	Eocene	Serraduy Formation	Spain	A crab, a species of Liocarcinus.	
Lobetelson feldmanni	Sp. nov	Valid	Klompmaker et al.	Carboniferous (Kasimovian)	Atrasado Formation	United States (New Mexico)	A member of Belotelsonidea.	
Locomius	Gen. et sp. nov	Valid	Ferratges et al.	Eocene	Serraduy Formation	Spain	A crab, a member of Cancroidea of uncertain affinities. The type species is L. parthenopimimus.	
Macrocheira enoptra	Sp. nov	Valid	Schweitzer	Eocene	Lookingglass Formation	United States (Oregon)	A species of Macrocheira.	
Mandocaris	Gen. et sp. nov	Valid	Lagrange et al.	Middle Jurassic (Callovian)	La Voulte-sur-Rhône lagerstätte	France	A member of to the family Acanthephyridae. The type species is M. polyphaga.	
Matutsalen	Gen. et sp. nov	Valid	Ferratges et al.	Eocene	Serraduy Formation	Spain	A crab belonging to the group Carpilioidea, possibly a member of the family Arabicarcinidae. The type species is M. rotundus.	
Megaceradocus umemotoi	Sp. nov	Valid	Ando & Mizuno	Miocene	Yamami Formation	Japan	An amphipod belonging to the family Maeridae.	
Microboschettia	Gen. et sp. nov	Valid	Ferratges et al.	Eocene	Serraduy Formation	Spain	A crab belonging to the family Carcinidae. The type species is M. elegans.	
Mioapseudes	Gen. et sp. nov	Valid	Wallaard	Miocene		Cyprus	A tanaidacean. The type species is M. mediterraneus.	
Morellosia	Gen. et sp. nov	Valid	Ossó et al.	Early Cretaceous (Aptian)	Forcall Formation	Spain	A member of the family Etyiidae. The type species is M. maestratensis.	
Nahecaris carlsi	Sp. nov		Zamora et al.	Devonian (Pragian)	Santa Cruz Formation	Spain	A member of Phyllocarida belonging to the family Rhinocarididae.	
Neocallichirus? priscus	Comb. nov	Valid	(Milne-Edwards)	Eocene		France	A member of the family Callichiridae; moved from Callianassa prisca Milne-Edwards (1860).	
Notopoides ovaloides	Sp. nov	Valid	Ferratges et al.	Eocene	Serraduy Formation	Spain	A crab belonging to the family Raninidae.	
Oncopareia californiana	Sp. nov	Valid	Garassino, Pasini & Nyborg	Late Cretaceous (Turonian)	Ladd Formation	United States (California)	A lobster.	
Paguristes dallagoi	Sp. nov	Valid	De Angeli & Marangon	Eocene		Italy	A species of Paguristes.	
Palaeastacus ruteni	Sp. nov		Charbonnier et al.	Middle Jurassic (Bathonian)		France	A member of the family Erymidae.	
Palaeomyra eocaenica	Sp. nov	Valid	De Angeli & Marangon	Eocene		Italy	A crab belonging to the family Leucosiidae.	
Parhalimede antiqua	Sp. nov	Valid	Ferratges et al.	Eocene	Serraduy Formation	Spain	A crab belonging to the family Galenidae.	
Pelorophontes	Gen. et sp. nov		Schweitzer & Schram	Carboniferous (Moscovian)		United States (Oklahoma)	A member of the family Gorgonophontidae. The type species is P. mayi.	
Philyra antiqua	Sp. nov	Valid	De Angeli & Marangon	Eocene		Italy	A crab belonging to the family Leucosiidae.	
Pilumnus escalantei	Sp. nov	Valid	Ossó in Ossó et al.	Miocene		Spain	A species of Pilumnus.	
Pseudoplakolana	Gen. et comb. nov	Valid	Schädel et al.	Early Cretaceous (Aptian)	Sierra Madre Formation	Mexico	An isopod belonging to the group Cymothoida. The type species is "Plakolana" chiapaneca Bruce et al. (2021).	
Quasilaeviranina arafita	Sp. nov	Valid	Ferratges et al.	Eocene	Serraduy Formation	Spain	A crab belonging to the family Raninidae.	
Quasilaeviranina yvonnecoeleae	Sp. nov	Valid	De Angeli & Marangon	Eocene		Italy	A crab belonging to the family Raninidae.	
Raninoides danicus	Sp. nov	Valid	Klompmaker et al.	Paleocene (Danian)	Clayton Formation	United States (Alabama)	A crab belonging to the family Raninidae.	
Rodneyellus	Gen. et sp. nov	Valid	Lima et al.		Pirabas Formation	Brazil	A crab belonging to the family Hexapodidae. Genus includes new species R. feldmanni.	
Sabellidromites santamarta	Sp. nov	Valid	Lima et al.	Late Cretaceous (Santonian–Campanian)	Santa Marta Formation	Antarctica	A crab belonging to the family Dynomenidae.	
Santeella italica	Sp. nov	Valid	De Angeli & Marangon	Eocene		Italy	A crab belonging to the family Pilumnidae.	
Serraranina	Gen. et sp. nov	Valid	Van Bakel, Fraaije & Jagt	Paleocene (Danian)		Denmark; Germany	A raninid crab. Genus includes new species S. stefanpolkowskyi.	
Stenodactylina souconnae	Sp. nov		Charbonnier et al.	Middle Jurassic (Bajocian)		France	A member of the family Erymidae.	
Synoriacarcinus	Gen. et comb. nov	Valid	Schweitzer, Feldmann & Findling	Late Cretaceous (Turonian to Campanian)	Merchantville Formation	United States (Delaware)	A crab belonging to the family Ibericancridae. The type species is "Diaulax" millerae Bishop (1992); genus also includes "Seorsus" kauffmani Feldmann et al. (2013) from the Mancos Shale (New Mexico, United States).	
Trapezionida chiyoensis	Sp. nov	Valid	Karasawa & Kato	Miocene		Japan	A species of Trapezionida.	
Viapagurus covavidrensis	Sp. nov	Valid	Ossó et al.	Early Cretaceous (Aptian)	Forcall Formation	Spain	A member of the family Paguridae.	
Wauregania	Gen. et comb. nov	Valid	Nyborg, Garassino & Vega	Eocene		United States (California)	A crab belonging to the family Goneplacidae; a new genus for "Plagiolophus" weaveri Rathbun (1926).	
Xanthilites robustus	Sp. nov	Valid	Ferratges et al.	Eocene	Serraduy Formation	Spain	A crab belonging to the family Tumidocarcinidae.	

==== Malacostracan research ====
- Bicknell et al. (2025) study two clusters of Archaeoniscus brodiei from the Berriasian Durlston Formation (United Kingdom), providing new information on the anatomy of the studied isopod.
- New information on the morphology of Beurlenia araripensis is provided by Lima et al. (2025).
- Mychko (2025) describes fossil material of Palaeastacus aff. solitarius from the Tithonian strata from the Cheryomukha River Basin (Yaroslavl Oblast, Russia), extending known geographical range of Late Jurassic members of the genus Palaeastacus.
- A study on the distribution and diversity of members of the family Glypheidae throughout their evolutionary history is published by Damborenea et al. (2025).
- Arthropod trackways produced by crayfish or similar decapods are described from the Upper Cretaceous Wapiti Formation (Alberta, Canada) by Kimitsuki et al. (2025).
- Worthy et al. (2025) identify fossil material (molar ridges of the mandible) of at least three taxa of parastacids from the Miocene Bannockburn Formation (New Zealand), providing evidence of greater diversity of parastacids in New Zealand in the Miocene compared to the present.
- Baucon et al. (2025) report the discovery of vertical burrows from a new Carnian site from the Travenanzes Formation (Italy), possibly representing the oldest fossil evidence of true crabs reported to date.
- Mychko, Schweitzer & Feldmann (2025) describe fossil material of Gastrosacus wetzleri and Goniodromites aliquantulus from Oxfordian reef limestones of the North Caucasus (Russia), expanding known geographical range of both taxa.

=== Ostracods ===
Name	Novelty	Status	Authors	Age	Type locality	Country	Notes	Images
Abyssocypris waleedi	Sp. nov	Valid	Sadeeq & Aziz	Paleogene	Aaliji Formation	Iraq	A member of the family Pontocyprididae.	
Acanthocythereis huyangorum	Nom. nov	Valid	Antonietto, Neto Silva & Brandão	Pliocene		Taiwan	A replacement name for Trachyleberis spinosus Hu & Yang (1975).	
Acanthocythereis kunihiroi	Sp. nov	Valid	Irizuki in Irizuki et al.	Miocene	Yoshino Formation	Japan	A member of the family Trachyleberididae.	
Acanthoscapha elenae	Nom. nov	Valid	Guillam & Hambardzumyan	Devonian		France	A replacement name for Bairdia rostrata Peneau (1929).	
Acrocythere zakharovi	Sp. nov	Valid	Tesakova & Franz in Franz, Tesakova & Schweigert	Jurassic		Germany		
Aechmina cuyanensis	Sp. nov	Valid	Salas, Sterren & Cisterna	Carboniferous		Argentina		
Aparchitellina lenis	Sp. nov	Valid	Sobolev	Devonian	Yba Formation	Russia		
Aparchitellina reticulata	Sp. nov	Valid	Sobolev	Devonian	Yba Formation	Russia		
Aurila costabausaensis	Sp. nov		Sciuto, Baldanza & Reitano	Pliocene		Italy		
Aurila daphnidis	Sp. nov		Sciuto, Baldanza & Reitano	Pliocene		Italy		
Aurila mazzarinoensis	Sp. nov		Sciuto, Baldanza & Reitano	Pliocene		Italy		
Aurila sanctiandreae	Sp. nov		Sciuto, Baldanza & Reitano	Pliocene		Italy		
Aviacypris valcourensis	Sp. nov	Valid	Zhang et al.	Ordovician	Crown Point Formation	United States (New York)	A member of the family Longisculidae.	
Bairdia azizi	Sp. nov	Valid	Sadeeq & Aziz	Paleogene	Aaliji Formation	Iraq	A member of Podocopida belonging to the family Bairdiidae.	
Bairdia dorsoundulata	Sp. nov		Mette & Moser	Middle Triassic (Ladinian)	Reifling Formation	Austria	A member of Podocopida belonging to the family Bairdiidae.	
Bairdia qilinzhaiensis	Sp. nov		Chen, Song & Qie	Devonian-Carboniferous transition	Tangbagou Formation	China		
Bairdia timorleste	Sp. nov		Forel in Forel, McCartain & Haig	Triassic		Timor-Leste		
Baltonotella erugospinosa	Sp. nov	Valid	Mcgairy et al.	Ordovician (Katian)	Phu Ngu Formation	Vietnam	A member of Podocopa belonging to the order Beyrichiocopida and the family Aparchitididae.	
Bizonidea	Gen. et comb. nov	Valid	Franz, Tesakova & Schweigert	Jurassic		France; Germany	Genus includes "Progonocythere" gublerae Bizon (1958).	
Bythoceratina (Praebythoceratina) latesulcata	Sp. nov	Valid	Franz, Tesakova & Schweigert	Jurassic		Germany		
Bythocypris aalijiensis	Sp. nov	Valid	Sadeeq & Aziz	Paleogene	Aaliji Formation	Iraq		
Chargatanella	Gen. et sp. nov	Valid	Melnikova in Melnikova, Ariunchimeg & Gereltsetseg	Silurian (Llandovery)	Chargat Formation	Mongolia	The type species is C. parva.	
Chimaerabinoda	Gen. et sp. nov	Valid	Mcgairy et al.	Ordovician (Katian)	Phu Ngu Formation	Vietnam	A member of Podocopa belonging to the order Beyrichiocopida and the family Aechminidae. The type species is C. reticulofimbriata.	
Cibotoleberis tsuyamensis	Sp. nov	Valid	Irizuki in Irizuki et al.	Miocene	Yoshino Formation	Japan	A member of the family Trachyleberididae.	
Collibolbina corrugata	Sp. nov	Valid	Mcgairy et al.	Ordovician (Katian)	Phu Ngu Formation	Vietnam	A member of Podocopa belonging to the order Beyrichiocopida and the family Tetradellidae.	
Cryptobairdia helenentalia	Sp. nov		Mette & Moser	Middle Triassic (Ladinian)	Reifling Formation	Austria	A member of Podocopida belonging to the family Bairdiidae.	
Cyclocypris bamba	Sp. nov		Díez-Somolinos et al.	Early Cretaceous (Barremian)		Spain	A species of Cyclocypris.	
Cypridea marihoni	Sp. nov		Díez-Somolinos et al.	Early Cretaceous (Barremian)		Spain	A member of Cypridoidea belonging to the family Cyprideidae.	
Cypridea vatra	Sp. nov		Díez-Somolinos et al.	Early Cretaceous (Barremian)		Spain	A member of Cypridoidea belonging to the family Cyprideidae.	
Cythereis hokkaidoensis	Sp. nov		Tanaka & Nishimura	Late Cretaceous (Campanian)		Japan		
Cytherella kurdistaniensis	Sp. nov		Qadafary, Taha & Kharajiany	Paleogene	Kolosh Formation	Iraq	A species of Cytherella.	
Cytherella qaradaghiensis	Sp. nov		Qadafary, Taha & Kharajiany	Paleogene	Kolosh Formation	Iraq	A species of Cytherella.	
Cytherella yezoensis	Sp. nov		Tanaka & Nishimura	Late Cretaceous (Campanian)		Japan		
Cytherelloidea hetonaiensis	Sp. nov		Tanaka & Nishimura	Late Cretaceous (Campanian)		Japan		
Cytherelloidea popetensis	Sp. nov		Tanaka & Nishimura	Late Cretaceous (Campanian)		Japan		
Cytheretta buccheriensis	Sp. nov		Sciuto, Baldanza & Reitano	Pliocene		Italy		
Cytherelloidea bractea	Sp. nov	Valid	Sheppard in Franz, Tesakova & Schweigert	Jurassic		France; Germany		
Cytheropteron sagirmaiensis	Sp. nov		Qadafary, Taha & Kharajiany	Paleogene	Kolosh Formation	Iraq		
Eokloedenella duodepressa	Sp. nov	Valid	Zhang et al.	Ordovician	Crown Point Formation	United States (New York)	A member of the family Leperditellidae.	
Eucytherura captinconcha	Sp. nov	Valid	Forel in Forel et al.	Early Cretaceous (Valanginian and Hauterivian)		France	A member of the family Cytheruridae.	
Eucytherura evae	Sp. nov	Valid	Tesakova & Franz in Franz, Tesakova & Schweigert	Jurassic		Germany		
Eucytherura paucicostata	Sp. nov	Valid	Franz, Tesakova & Schweigert	Jurassic		Germany		
Glyptocythere pseudotuberosa	Nom. nov	Valid	Tesakova	Middle Jurassic (Bathonian)		Germany	A replacement name for Glyptocythere tuberosa Brand & Malz (1962).	
Haplocytheridea maedai	Sp. nov		Tanaka & Nishimura	Late Cretaceous (Campanian)		Japan		
Hiatobairdia peggy	Sp. nov		Forel	Late Triassic (Carnian)	San Cassiano Formation	Italy		
Hobetsucythereis	Gen. et sp. nov		Tanaka & Nishimura	Late Cretaceous (Campanian)		Japan	Genus includes new species H. ohtatsumei.	
Hungarella aitutu	Sp. nov		Forel in Forel, McCartain & Haig	Triassic		Timor-Leste		
Ilyocypris tryponata	Sp. nov		Maia et al.	Early Cretaceous (Aptian)	Codó Formation	Brazil		
Jhurancythere	Gen. et sp. nov	Valid	Kumari & Mahalakshmi in Kumari, Mahalakshmi & Muduli	Late Jurassic (Kimmeridgian)	Jhuran Formation	India	A member of the family Cytherideidae. Genus includes new species J. austerata. Published online in 2026, but the issue date is listed as December 2025.	
Judahella leii	Sp. nov	Valid	Forel et al.	Middle Triassic	Guanling Formation	China		
Keijella longiundosa	Sp. nov		Sciuto in Benkhedda et al.	Miocene (Tortonian)		Algeria	A member of the family Trachyleberididae.	
Khandianella	Gen. et sp. nov	Valid	Melnikova in Melnikova, Ariunchimeg & Gereltsetseg	Silurian (Llandovery)	Chargat Formation	Mongolia	The type species is K. scrobiculata.	
Laterophores arrisoris	Sp. nov	Valid	Mcgairy et al.	Ordovician (Katian)	Phu Ngu Formation	Vietnam	A member of Podocopa belonging to the order Beyrichiocopida and the family Bolliidae.	
Laterophores reticulatus	Sp. nov	Valid	Mcgairy et al.	Ordovician (Katian)	Phu Ngu Formation	Vietnam	A member of Podocopa belonging to the order Beyrichiocopida and the family Bolliidae.	
Lophocythere? jhuranensis	Sp. nov	Valid	Kumari & Mahalakshmi in Mahalakshmi, Kumari & Muduli	Late Jurassic (Kimmeridgian)	Jhuran Formation	India	Published online in 2025, but the issue date is listed as December 2024.	
Lophocythere mosaica	Sp. nov	Valid	Shurupova	Middle Jurassic (Callovian)		Russia (Kursk Oblast)		
Lophocythere tuberculata	Sp. nov	Valid	Shurupova	Middle Jurassic (Callovian)		Russia (Kursk Oblast; Ryazan Oblast)		
Macrodentina jaduraensis	Sp. nov	Valid	Kumari & Mahalakshmi in Mahalakshmi, Kumari & Muduli	Late Jurassic (Kimmeridgian)	Jhuran Formation	India	Published online in 2025, but the issue date is listed as December 2024.	
Microcheilinella pranskeviciusi	Nom. nov	Valid	Guillam & Hambardzumyan	Silurian		Lithuania	A replacement name for Microcheilinella angusta Pranskevičius (1971).	
Mongolocypris shai	Sp. nov	Valid	Wang	Early Cretaceous	Xiaonangou Formation	China		
Nekrocypris	Gen. et sp. nov	Valid	Forel in Forel et al.	Early Cretaceous (Hauterivian)		France	A member of the family Pontocyprididae. The type species is N. sepultinconcha.	
Neurocythere margaritae	Sp. nov	Valid	Tesakova	Middle Jurassic (Callovian)		Russia		
Neurocythere parva	Sp. nov	Valid	Tesakova	Middle Jurassic (Callovian)		Russia		
Okadaleberis tafnaensis	Sp. nov		Sciuto in Benkhedda et al.	Miocene (Tortonian)		Algeria	A member of the family Trachyleberididae.	
Ordovizona? constricta	Sp. nov	Valid	Mcgairy et al.	Ordovician (Katian)	Phu Ngu Formation	Vietnam	A member of Podocopa belonging to the order Beyrichiocopida and the family Ordovizonidae.	
Pacambocythere ishizakii	Sp. nov	Valid	Irizuki in Irizuki et al.	Miocene	Yoshino Formation	Japan	A member of the family Trachyleberididae.	
Paleodarwinula gregorysohni	Sp. nov		Bergue et al.	Permian	Rio do Rasto Formation	Brazil		
Paleodarwinula moliyae	Sp. nov		Bergue et al.	Permian	Rio do Rasto Formation	Brazil		
Paracypris jambourensis	Sp. nov	Valid	Sadeeq & Aziz	Paleogene	Aaliji Formation	Iraq		
Paracypris koloshiensis	Sp. nov		Qadafary, Taha & Kharajiany	Paleogene	Kolosh Formation	Iraq		
Patellacythere lineata	Sp. nov	Valid	Kumari & Mahalakshmi in Mahalakshmi, Kumari & Muduli	Late Jurassic (Kimmeridgian)	Jhuran Formation	India	Published online in 2025, but the issue date is listed as December 2024.	
Pattersoncypris inflata	Sp. nov		Maia et al.	Early Cretaceous (Aptian)	Codó Formation	Brazil		
Pattersoncypris labiata	Sp. nov		Maia et al.	Early Cretaceous	Crato Formation	Brazil	A member of the family Cyprididae.	
Perissocytheridea (Kroemmelbeinella) hiblaea	Sp. nov		Sciuto, Baldanza & Reitano	Pliocene		Italy		
Polycope fischeri	Sp. nov	Valid	Franz, Tesakova & Schweigert	Jurassic		Germany		
Polycope latitudialis	Sp. nov		Mette & Moser	Middle Triassic (Ladinian)	Reifling Formation	Austria	A member of Halocyprida belonging to the family Polycopidae.	
Polycope marginoplanata	Sp. nov		Mette & Moser	Middle Triassic (Ladinian)	Reifling Formation	Austria	A member of Halocyprida belonging to the family Polycopidae.	
Polycope marginotorata	Sp. nov		Mette & Moser	Middle Triassic (Ladinian)	Reifling Formation	Austria	A member of Halocyprida belonging to the family Polycopidae.	
Pontopolycope reiflingia	Sp. nov		Mette & Moser	Middle Triassic (Ladinian)	Reifling Formation	Austria	A member of Halocyprida belonging to the family Polycopidae.	
Procytherura ? striata	Sp. nov	Valid	Franz, Tesakova & Schweigert	Jurassic		Germany		
Reconcavona grandiensis	Comb. nov	Valid	(Tomé, Lima Filho & Neumann)	Early Cretaceous	Araripe Basin	Brazil	A member of the family Paracyprididae; moved from Damonella grandiensis Tomé, Lima Filho & Neumann (2014).	
Tenedocythere forticostata	Sp. nov		Sciuto, Baldanza & Reitano	Pliocene		Italy		
Terquemula pseudoflexicosta	Sp. nov	Valid	Tesakova	Middle Jurassic (Callovian)		Russia		
Triadohealdia cribasensis	Sp. nov		Forel in Forel, McCartain & Haig	Triassic		Timor-Leste		
Triadohealdia manatuto	Sp. nov		Forel in Forel, McCartain & Haig	Triassic		Timor-Leste		
Urobairdia umbonata	Sp. nov		Mette & Moser	Middle Triassic (Ladinian)	Reifling Formation	Austria	A member of Podocopida belonging to the family Bairdiidae.	
Verrucocythereis verrucomurata	Sp. nov		Sciuto, Baldanza & Reitano	Pliocene		Italy		
Vesticytherura curticostata	Sp. nov	Valid	Franz, Tesakova & Schweigert	Jurassic		Germany		
Vesticytherura intermedia	Sp. nov	Valid	Franz, Tesakova & Schweigert	Jurassic		Germany		
Vesticytherura interpumicosa	Sp. nov	Valid	Franz, Tesakova & Schweigert	Jurassic		Germany		
Vesticytherura rectangulata	Sp. nov	Valid	Tesakova & Franz in Franz, Tesakova & Schweigert	Jurassic		Germany		
Vesticytherura schweizeri	Sp. nov	Valid	Franz, Tesakova & Schweigert	Jurassic		Germany		
Vogdesella longidorsa	Sp. nov	Valid	Zhang et al.	Ordovician	Crown Point Formation	United States (New York)	A member of the family Circulinidae.	
Woodeltia sorapuchiensis	Sp. nov	Valid	Mukai & Tanaka	Pliocene	Takikawa Formation	Japan	The type species of the genus Woodeltia (also including extant species "Celtia" japonica Ishizaki, 1981, "Celtia" blizhnii Brouwers, 1993, "Celtia" palmensis Brouwers, 1993 and "Celtia" pointmanbiensis Brouwers, 1993).	
Woodeltia subreticulata	Comb. nov	Valid	(Irizuki & Yamada in Irizuki et al.)	Miocene		Japan	Moved from "Celtia" subreticulata Irizuki & Yamada in Irizuki et al. (2004).	
Zonocypris goyi	Sp. nov		Díez-Somolinos et al.	Early Cretaceous (Barremian)		Spain		

==== Ostracod research ====
- Evidence from the study of Silurian ostracod assemblages from the eastern Baltic Basin (Lithuania), indicating that the mid-Homerian biotic turnover event most likely lasted approximately 260,000 years (and thus was shorter than indicated by earlier estimates), is presented by Rinkevičiūtė et al. (2025).
- Forel et al. (2025) study the composition of the Late Jurassic ostracod assemblages from the Sahune site (France), interpreting representatives of Pontocyprididae as members of deep-sea ostracod communities at least from the Oxfordian to the Early Cretaceous, and providing new information on the morphology of Procytherura? praecoquum.
- Lim (2025) studies the diversification dynamics of Cyprideidae through time, and interprets the fossil record of the group as indicating that the family underwent evolutionary radiation during the Jurassic-Cretaceous transition, regardless of possible taxonomic inflation of members of the group.
- Wang et al. (2025) revise the ostracod fauna from the Upper Cretaceous Liwaxia and Madongshan formations (China), correlate it with contemporaneous ostracod faunas from China and Mongolia, and assign the genus Liupanshania to the subfamily Cyproidinae in the family Notodromadidae.
- A study on routes and mechanisms of dispersal of non-marine ostracods belonging to the subfamily Talicyprideinae during the Campanian–Maastrichtian is published by Gobbo & Bertini (2025).
- Patarroyo et al. (2025) study two ostracod assemblages from the Maastrichtian strata of the Colón Formation (Colombia), and interpret the differences in their composition as resulting from an environmental shift during the latest Cretaceous.
- A study on the composition and biogeographical connections of ostracod assemblages from the Paleocene-Eocene sedimentary succession at Wadi Tarfa (Egypt) is published by Samir et al. (2025).

=== Thecostracans ===
Name	Novelty	Status	Authors	Age	Type locality	Country	Notes	Images
Alabamalepas	Gen. et sp. nov	Valid	Perreault, Collareta & Buckeridge	Oligocene		United States (Alabama; South Carolina)	A barnacle belonging to the family Platylepadidae. Genus includes new species A. cookei.	
Amphibalanus itoigawai	Sp. nov	Valid	Karasawa & Kobayashi	Early-Middle Miocene (Burdigalian)-(Langhian)	Toyama Formation, Iwamura Groupp; Akeyo and Oidawara formations, Mizunami Group	Japan	A member of the family Balanidae.	
Bognorscalpellum	Gen. et comb. nov	Valid	Gale	Eocene		United Kingdom	A barnacle. The type species is "Mitella" venablesi Withers (1953); genus also includes "Mitella" daviesi Withers (1953).	
Catherinum cantianum	Sp. nov	Valid	Gale			United Kingdom	A barnacle.	
Catherinum monolineatum	Sp. nov	Valid	Gale			United Kingdom	A barnacle.	
Catherinum polystriatum	Sp. nov	Valid	Gale			United Kingdom	A barnacle.	
Catherinum rowei	Sp. nov	Valid	Gale			United Kingdom	A barnacle.	
Jaegerscalpellum auriculum	Sp. nov	Valid	Gale	Late Cretaceous (Cenomanian)	West Melbury Marly Chalk Formation	United Kingdom	A barnacle.	
Lacrymascalpellum	Gen. et comb. nov	Valid	Gale	Miocene to Pleistocene		Austria; Czech Republic; France; Italy; Switzerland; United Kingdom	A barnacle. The type species is "Scalpellum" burdigalense Des Moulins (1875); genus also includes "Scalpellum" magnum Darwin (1851), "Scalpellum" dalpiazi Withers (1953), "Scalpellum" molinianum Seguenza (1876), "Scalpellum" lovisatoi De Alessandri (1895), "Scalpellum" studeri Tièche (1905), "Scalpellum" moraviense Withers (1953) and "Scalpellum" sigmoideum Withers (1953).	
Laeviscalpellum	Gen. et comb. nov	Valid	Gale	Cretaceous		United Kingdom; United States	A barnacle. The type species is "Virgiscalpellum" laevis Gale (2020); genus also includes "Virgiscalpellum" rugosum Gale (2020).	
Lepas hantonensis	Sp. nov	Valid	Gale			United Kingdom	A barnacle.	
Lepas tanakai	Sp. nov	Valid	Karasawa & Kobayashi	Early Miocene (Burdigalian)	Akeyo Formation, Mizunami Group	Japan	A member of the family Lepadidae.	
Megabalanus yamaguchii	Sp. nov	Valid	Karasawa & Kobayashi	Early-Middle Miocene (Burdigalian)- (Langhian)	Akeyo and Oidawara formations, Mizunami Group	Japan	A member of the family Balanidae.	
Membranobalanus distortus	Sp. nov	Valid	Gale & Sadorf	Pliocene (Piacenzian)	Yorktown Formation	United States (North Carolina)	A member of the family Balanidae.	
Poecilasma cretacea	Sp. nov	Valid	Gale	Late Cretaceous		Sweden; United Kingdom	A barnacle belonging to the family Poecilasmatidae.	
Proverruca cenomanica	Sp. nov	Valid	Gale	Late Cretaceous (Cenomanian)	Zig Zag Chalk Formation	United Kingdom	A barnacle.	
Proverruca minuta	Sp. nov	Valid	Gale	Late Cretaceous (Campanian)	Newhaven Chalk Formation	United Kingdom	A barnacle.	
Proverruca ornata	Sp. nov	Valid	Gale & Jagt	Late Cretaceous (Campanian)	Gulpen Formation	Belgium	A barnacle.	
Solidobalanus hataii	Sp. nov	Valid	Karasawa & Kobayashi	Early-Middle Miocene (Burdigalian)-(Langhian)	Akeyo and Oidawara formations, Mizunami Group	Japan	A member of the family Balanidae.	
Solidoscalpellum	Gen. et comb. nov	Valid	Gale	Cretaceous		Kazakhstan; Sweden; United Kingdom	A scalpellid barnacle. The type species is "Scalpellum maximum" var. cylindraceum Darwin (1851); genus also includes "Arcoscalpellum maximum" var. triminghamensis Withers (1935), "Cretiscalpellum" sharapovi Alekseev (2009) and "Pollicipes" angelini Darwin (1851).	
Striascalpellum harnhamensis	Sp. nov	Valid	Gale	Late Cretaceous (Campanian)	Newhaven Chalk Formation	United Kingdom	A barnacle.	
Tetraclitella mizunamiensis	Sp. nov	Valid	Karasawa & Kobayashi	Early Miocene (Burdigalian)	Akeyo Formation, Mizunami Group	Japan	A member of the family Tetraclitidae.	
Tetraclitella tokiensis	Sp. nov	Valid	Karasawa & Kobayashi	Early Miocene (Burdigalian)	Akeyo Formation, Mizunami Group	Japan	A member of the family Tetraclitidae.	
Tetrinis schooni	Sp. nov		Buckeridge & Smith	Early Cretaceous (Albian)	Allaru Formation	Australia	A barnacle belonging to the group Scalpellomorpha and the family Zeugmatolepadidae.	
Titanolepas curvatus	Sp. nov	Valid	Gale	Late Cretaceous (Campanian)	Newhaven Chalk Formation	United Kingdom	A barnacle.	
Virgilepas angulosum	Sp. nov	Valid	Gale			United Kingdom	A barnacle.	
Virgilepas withersi	Sp. nov	Valid	Gale			United Kingdom	A barnacle.	
Virgiscalpellum brydonei	Sp. nov	Valid	Gale			United Kingdom	A barnacle.	

==== Thecostracan research ====
- Bojarski, Cierocka & Szwedo (2025) report the discovery of nine inclusions of balanomorph barnacles in the Miocene Mexican amber.
- Gale & Sadorf (2025) report the discovery of fossil material of Verruca stroemia from the Pliocene strata of the Yorktown Formation (North Carolina, United States), and interpret purported extinct species V. alaskana and V. koikei as junior synonyms of V. stroemia.

=== Other crustaceans ===
Name	Novelty	Status	Authors	Age	Type locality	Country	Notes	Images
Halicyne tanaitica	Sp. nov	Valid	Mychko	Early Triassic (Olenekian)	Lipovskaya Formation	Russia (Volgograd Oblast)	A member of Cyclida.	
Missouriclus	Gen. et comb. nov		Schweitzer, Mychko & Lehnert	Carboniferous (Kasimovian)	Iola Formation	United States (Missouri)	A member of Cyclida. Genus includes "Cyclus" communis Rogers (1902).	
Norestheria franconica	Sp. nov	Valid	Geyer & Sell	Late Triassic (Carnian)	Hassberge Formation	Germany	A clam shrimp.	
Ohioclus	Gen. et comb. nov		Schweitzer, Mychko & Lehnert	Carboniferous (Kasimovian)		United States (Ohio)	A member of Cyclida. Genus includes O. columbianensis.	
Oonocarcinus uralicus	Sp. nov	Valid	Mychko, Alekseev & Schweitzer	Carboniferous (Gzhelian)–Permian (Asselian)		Russia (Perm Krai)	A member of Cyclida.	
Palaeolimnadia stevenbeckeri	Sp. nov	Valid	Poschmann et al.	Devonian (Emsian)	Klerf Formation	Luxembourg	A clam shrimp belonging to the family Paleolimnadiidae.	
Pavelskine	Gen. et comb. nov		Schweitzer, Mychko & Lehnert	Carboniferous (Kasimovian)	Iola Formation	United States (Missouri)	A member of Cyclida. Genus includes "Cyclus" packardi Rogers (1902).	
Planamandibulus	Gen. et sp. nov	Valid	Reynolds et al.	Cambrian Stage 10	Windfall Formation	United States (Nevada)	A member of Phosphatocopida belonging to the family Cyclotronidae. The type species is P. nevadensis.	
Polygrapta dazuensis	Comb. nov		(Chen)	Late Triassic	Xujiahe Formation	China	A clam shrimp belonging to the family Polygraptidae; moved from Euestheria dazuensis Chen (1974)	
Polygrapta yipinglangensis	Comb. nov	Valid	(Chen)	Late Triassic	Ganghaizi Formation	China	A clam shrimp belonging to the family Polygraptidae; moved from Euestheria yipinglangensis Chen (1974)	
Uralocyclus feldmanni	Sp. nov	Valid	Mychko, Alekseev & Schweitzer	Carboniferous (Viséan or Serpukhovian)		Russia (Chelyabinsk Oblast)	A member of Cyclida.	
Weichangiops squamosus	Sp. nov		Wang, Ren & Zhao	Early Cretaceous	Yixian Formation	China	A notostracan.	
Yunnanocyclus fortis	Sp. nov		Sun et al.	Early Triassic (Induan)		China	A member of Cyclida.	

==== Other crustacean research ====
- Bicknell et al. (2025) describe an assemblage of 50 specimens of Schramine montanaensis from the Carboniferous Bear Gulch Limestone (Montana, United States), representing one of oldest records of gregarious behavior of crustaceans reported to date.

== Radiodonts ==
Name	Novelty	Status	Authors	Age	Type locality	Country	Notes	Images
Falciscaris	Gen. et sp. nov	Valid	Potin et al.	Cambrian (Jiangshanian) to Ordovician (Tremadocian)	Fezouata Formation	China; Morocco	A member of the family Hurdiidae. The type species is F. mumakiana.	
Mosura	Gen. et sp. nov	Valid	Moysiuk and Caron	Cambrian (Wuliuan)	Burgess Shale	Canada (British Columbia)	A member of the family Hurdiidae, likely sister to all other genera within the clade. The type species is M. fentoni.	
Verrocaris	Gen. et sp. nov	Valid	Oxman, Minkowitz & Thomas	Cambrian Stage 4	Kinzers Formation	United States (Pennsylvania)	A member of the family Anomalocarididae. The type species is V. kerrymatti.	

=== Radiodont research ===
- Evidence from the study of new fossil material of Caryosyntrips from the Cambrian strata of the Hongjiangshao Formation (China) and Spence Shale (Utah, United States), interpreted as indicating that characters used to diagnose species belonging to this genus might instead reflect variation within the same species, is presented by Yang et al. (2025).
- Luo et al. (2025) describe fossil material of Ursulinacaris cf. U. grallae from the Miaolingian strata of the Kaili Formation (China), expanding known geographical range of members of the genus Ursulinacaris.

== Trilobites ==
Name	Novelty	Status	Authors	Age	Type locality	Country	Notes	Images
Albertella nebeli	Sp. nov	Valid	Sundberg et al.	Cambrian		United States		
Amphoton bicknelli	Sp. nov	Valid	Smith et al.	Cambrian (Miaolingian)	Tasman Formation	New Zealand	A member of the family Dolichometopidae.	
Atops antiatlasensis	Sp. nov		Geyer & Landing	Cambrian		Morocco		
"Balticoglaucus" avalonensis	Sp. nov	Valid	Westrop & Landing	Cambrian (Drumian)	Manuels River Formation	Canada (New Brunswick)	A member of the family Solenopleuridae.	
Batocara tuberosus	Sp. nov	Valid	Wei et al.	Ordovician-Silurian transition		China		
Bergeronites leishuae	Sp. nov		Peng et al.	Cambrian (Guzhangian)	Longha Formation	China	A member of the family Damesellidae.	
Bohemilla xesta	Sp. nov	Valid	Ingham & Owen	Ordovician (Katian)		United Kingdom	Published online in 2026, but the issue date is listed as October 2025.	
Branikarges euanclarksoni	Sp. nov	Valid	Feist	Devonian (Emsian)	Izarne Formation	France	Published online in 2026, but the issue date is listed as October 2025.	
Catillicephalites? ambiguus	Sp. nov	Valid	Westrop & Dengler	Cambrian		Canada		
Ciliscutellum rhaxerosides	Sp. nov	Valid	Wei et al.	Ordovician-Silurian transition		China		
Cummingella europa	Sp. nov	Valid	Müller	Carboniferous (Viséan)	Heiligenhaus Formation	Germany	A member of the family Phillipsiidae.	
Cummingella pauli	Sp. nov	Valid	Müller	Carboniferous (Viséan)	Heiligenhaus Formation	Germany	A member of the family Phillipsiidae.	
Cyphaspis hauptigi	Sp. nov	Valid	Van Viersen & Bohatý	Devonian (Frasnian)	Oos Formation	Germany	A member of the family Aulacopleuridae.	
Cyrtosymboloides koenigshofi	Sp. nov	Valid	Flick	Devonian	Hermershausen Limestone	Germany		
Delocare diadema grimbiemontense	Ssp. nov	Valid	Van Viersen	Devonian (Emsian)		Belgium		
Dinea	Gen. et sp. nov	Valid	Westrop & Dengler	Cambrian (Drumian)		Canada	A probable member of the family Asaphiscidae. Genus includes new species D. bulla.	
Gangchengia	Gen. et sp. nov		Ren et al.	Cambrian (Drumian)	Changhia Formation	China	A dameselloid trilobite. Genus includes new species G. subcylindrica.	
Ibexocephala	Gen. et 2 sp. nov	Valid	Adrain	Ordovician (Tremadocian)	Garden City Formation	United States (Idaho)	A member of the family Bathyuridae. The type species is I. lossoae; genus also includes I. dekosterae from the Fillmore Formation (Utah, United States).	
Imighzeria	Gen. et sp. nov		Geyer & Landing	Cambrian		Morocco	Genus includes new species I. silena.	
Janusiproetus	Gen. et comb. et ssp. nov	Valid	Basse & Müller	Devonian		Germany	A member of the family Tropidocoryphidae. Genus includes "Cornuproetus (Quadratoproetus)" maureri Alberti (1967), including new subspecies Janusiproetus maureri guenterodatilis.	
"Jincella" arenata	Sp. nov	Valid	Westrop & Landing	Cambrian (Drumian)	Manuels River Formation	Canada (New Brunswick)	A member of the family Solenopleuridae.	
Kayseraspis rugosa	Sp. nov	Valid	Ghobadi Pour	Ordovician (Tremadocian)		Iran		
Kettneraspis dickinsoni	Sp. nov	Valid	Van Viersen, Lerouge & Kesselaer	Devonian (Pragian)	Ihandar Formation	Morocco	A member of the family Odontopleuridae.	
Kootenia barensis	Sp. nov	Valid	Sundberg et al.	Cambrian		United States		
Leonaspis burketti	Sp. nov	Valid	Van Viersen, Lerouge & Kesselaer	Devonian (Pragian)	Ihandar Formation	Morocco	A member of the family Odontopleuridae.	
Leonaspis chancellori	Sp. nov	Valid	Van Viersen, Lerouge & Kesselaer	Devonian (Pragian)	Ihandar Formation	Morocco	A member of the family Odontopleuridae.	
Licnocephala bradleyi	Sp. nov	Valid	Adrain	Ordovician (Tremadocian)	Garden City Formation	United States (Idaho)	A member of the family Bathyuridae.	
Licnocephala ngi	Sp. nov	Valid	Adrain	Ordovician (Tremadocian)	Garden City Formation	United States (Idaho)	A member of the family Bathyuridae.	
Lorrettina diemenensis	Sp. nov	Valid	Laurie, Jago & Bischoff	Cambrian (Furongian)		Australia		
Maladioidella spinosa	Sp. nov	Valid	Laurie, Jago & Bischoff	Cambrian (Furongian)		Australia		
Mansuyites vivianensis	Sp. nov	Valid	Laurie, Jago & Bischoff	Cambrian (Furongian)		Australia		
Meadowtownella yunnanensis	Sp. nov	Valid	Wei et al.	Ordovician-Silurian transition		China		
Neoacrocephalina	Gen. et sp. nov	Valid	Laurie, Jago & Bischoff	Cambrian (Furongian)		Australia	Genus includes new species N. banksi.	
Neogriffithides artamonovorum	Sp. nov	Valid	Mychko	Permian (Wuchiapingian)		Russia (Primorsky Krai)		
Novoriocephalus	Gen. et sp. nov	Valid	Laurie, Jago & Bischoff	Cambrian (Furongian)		Australia	Genus includes new species N. lagoonensis.	
Omegops armeniensis	Sp. nov	Valid	Crônier et al.	Devonian (Famennian)		Armenia	Published online in 2026, but the issue date is listed as October 2025.	
Onaraspis schmitzi	Sp. nov		Sepúlveda et al.	Cambrian	Daroca Formation	Spain	A member of the family Bathynotidae.	
Onchonotellus arealis	Sp. nov	Valid	Makarova et al.	Cambrian		Russia		
Onchonotopsis formosa	Sp. nov	Valid	Westrop & Dengler	Cambrian		Canada		
Osceolia tumerispina	Sp. nov	Valid	Srivastava-Losey & Hughes	Cambrian	St. Lawrence Formation	United States (Wisconsin)	A member of the family Dikelocephalidae.	
Pachimocaspis	Sp. nov	Valid	Rustán et al.	Silurian-Devonian transition		Argentina; Bolivia	A dalmanitid trilobite. Genus includes new species P. pachimocensis.	
Paraphillipsia urushtensis	Sp. nov	Valid	Mychko	Permian (Changhsingian)	Belalabino Group	Russia (Krasnodar Krai)	A member of the family Phillipsiidae.	
Parasolenopleura siberica	Sp. nov	Valid	Makarova et al.	Cambrian		Russia		
Paulaspis schmidtthomei	Sp. nov		Sepúlveda et al.	Cambrian	Huérmeda Formation	Spain	A member of the family Bathynotidae.	
Piriproetus ornatissimus nictans	Ssp. nov	Valid	Flick	Devonian	Hermershausen Limestone	Germany		
Politicurus edwardsi	Sp. nov	Valid	Ng, Bradley & Adrain in Adrain et al.	Ordovician (Tremadocian)	House Limestone	United States (Utah)	A member of the family Hystricuridae.	
Praepatokephalus housensis	Sp. nov	Valid	Adrain & Pérez-Peris in Adrain et al.	Ordovician (Tremadocian)	House Limestone	United States (Utah)	A member of the family Remopleurididae.	
Pseudanomocarina falcata	Sp. nov	Valid	Makarova et al.	Cambrian		Russia		
Pseudokotuia	Gen. et sp. nov	Valid	Ren et al.	Cambrian (Paibian)	Chaumitien Formation	China	A member of the family Anomocaridae. Genus includes new species P. quadrata. The final version of the article naming it was published online in 2026, but the issue date is listed as December 2025.	
Ptychopleurites myrowi	Sp. nov	Valid	Taylor, Strauss & Repetski	Cambrian	Jones Ridge Limestone	United States (Alaska)		
Sinoencrinurus	Gen. et comb. nov	Valid	Wei et al.	Ordovician-Silurian transition	Lianfeng Formation	China	The type species is "Encrinuroides" zhenxiongensis Sheng (1964); genus also includes "Niuchangella" meitanensis Zhang (1974), "Encrinuroides" yanheensis Yin in Yin & Lee (1978), "Encrinuroides" yichangensis Yi (1978) and "Encrinuroides" yinjiangensis Zhang (1974).	
Skullrockicurus	Gen. et sp. nov	Valid	Losso & Adrain in Adrain et al.	Ordovician (Tremadocian)	House Limestone	United States (Utah)	A member of the family Dimeropygidae. The type species is S. plummeri.	
Solenoparia bensoni	Sp. nov	Valid	Smith et al.	Cambrian (Miaolingian)	Tasman Formation	New Zealand	A member of the family Solenopleuridae.	
Symphysurina ripperdani	Sp. nov	Valid	Taylor, Strauss & Repetski	Cambrian	Jones Ridge Limestone	United States (Alaska)		
Tasmanosaukia	Gen. et sp. nov	Valid	Laurie, Jago & Bischoff	Cambrian (Furongian)		Australia	Genus includes new species T. pulchra.	
Toxotiformis tchopkiensis	Sp. nov	Valid	Makarova et al.	Cambrian		Russia		
Vicnepea bentleyi	Sp. nov	Valid	Smith et al.	Cambrian (Miaolingian)	Tasman Formation	New Zealand	A member of the family Nepeidae.	
?Wuhuia turuaensis	Sp. nov	Valid	Laurie, Jago & Bischoff	Cambrian (Furongian)		Australia		
Yunnanoproetus	Gen. et sp. nov	Valid	Wei et al.	Ordovician-Silurian transition		China	The type species is Y. shanshuensis.	

=== Trilobite research ===
- Evidence of impact of changes in marine redox on the evolution of body size of Cambrian and Ordovician trilobites is presented by Sun et al. (2025).
- Balseiro, Serra & Bignon (2025) identify extinction as the main driver of expansion and contraction of morphological diversity of trilobites from Cambrian to Devonian.
- Dai, Zhang & Peng (2025) present essentially complete post-embryonic growth series of Maotunia iddingsi on the basis of fossils from the Cambrian (Drumian) Zhangxia Formation (Shandong, China).
- Evidence of changes of moulting behavior of oryctocephalid trilobites from the Cambrian Balang Formation (China) throughout their ontogeny is presented by Wang et al. (2025).
- Bailey et al. (2025) report evidence of preservation of chitin in the fossil material of Olenellus from the Cambrian Carrara Formation (California, United States).
- A study on the phylogenetic relationships of cyclopygid trilobites is published by Braddy, Dale & Wang (2025).
- Gómez-Rodríguez, López-Pachón & Esteve (2025) argue that the body shape of raphiophorid trilobites prevented them from being moved from the seafloor by water currents, that the spine projecting from the anterior part of the glabella of these trilobites had no hydrodynamic function and that this spine was likely a sensory organ.
- Revision of the family Olenidae is published by Monti (2025).
- Crônier, Couette & Laffont (2025) compare the utility of 2D and 3D quantitative analyses for the studies of morphological diversity of phacopid trilobites.
- Redescription of Laneites ingricus and Ceraurinella ornata and a review of cheirurine occurrences across Baltoscandia is published by Ebbestad et al. (2025).
- Zabini et al. (2025) identify fossil material of Mucronaspis sp. from the Ordovician Iapó Formation, representing the oldest record of a trilobite from Brazil reported to date.
- A study on the modular organization of the trilobite head, as indicated by data from specimens of Ceraurus pleurexanthemus from the Ordovician (Sandbian) Glens Falls Limestone (New York, United States), is published by Vargas-Parra & Hopkins (2025).
- A study on the phylogenetic relationships of members of the family Phillipsiidae is published by Brezinski (2025).
- Feist & Morzadec (2025) revise "Lichas" kerfornei from the Pragian Saint Céneré Formation (Brittany, France), and assign it to the genus Branikarges.
- Fossil material of Platyscutellum massai and Cavetia furcifera interpreted as indicating that the studied trilobites assembled in vent cavities in large groups, likely during synchronized moulting events, is described from the Devonian strata in Morocco by Belka et al. (2025).
- Nikolic, Warnock & Hopkins (2025) evaluate the utility of inclusion of both fossils with morphological data and ones only with taxonomic constraints and data on age but without morphological data in the analyses aiming to recover dated phylogeny of extinct taxa, testing their combined approach on trilobites from the group Aulacopleurida, and argue that a combined analysis outperforms analyses that only include taxa scored into a morphological matrix.
- Wright & Hopkins (2025) experiment with a morphological dataset of olenid trilobites to determine impact of assumptions about morphological evolution reflected in different character model configurations on phylogenetic analyses based on fossil data and on inferences about macroevolution derived from those analyses.
- A study on the phylogenetic relationships of Devonian members of Proetida is published by Jordan-Burmeister (2025).

== Other arthropods ==
Name	Novelty	Status	Authors	Age	Type locality	Country	Notes	Images
Ammagnostus minutus	Sp. nov	Valid	Makarova et al.	Cambrian		Russia	A member of Agnostida.	
Aspidagnostus baoi	Sp. nov		Bentley & Jago	Cambrian (Guzhangian)		Australia	A member of Agnostida.	
Austroxandarella	Gen. et sp. nov	Valid	Edgecombe, García-Bellido & Paterson	Cambrian Stage 4	Emu Bay Shale	Australia	A member of Xandarellida. The type species is A. poikar.	
Cassicaris	Gen. et sp. nov	Valid	Guo et al.	Cambrian	Hongjingshao Formation	China	A bivalved arthropod belonging to the group Odaraiida and the family Pectocarididae. The type species is C. clarksoni. Published online in 2026, but the issue date is listed as October 2025.	
?Cotalagnostus novaezealandiae	Sp. nov	Valid	Smith et al.	Cambrian (Miaolingian)	Tasman Formation	New Zealand	A member of Agnostida belonging to the family Spinagnostidae.	
Dabashanella? lunaiformis	Sp. nov	Valid	Peel	Cambrian (Wuliuan)	Henson Gletscher Formation	Greenland	A member of Phosphatocopida belonging to the family Dabashanellidae.	
Dollocaris toarcica	Sp. nov	Valid	Gerbe, Hyžný & Schlögl	Early Jurassic (Toarcian)	Krempachy Marl Formation	Slovakia	A thylacocephalan.	
Hypagnostus porterensis	Sp. nov	Valid	Westrop & Landing	Cambrian (Drumian)	Manuels River Formation	Canada (New Brunswick)	A member of Agnostida.	
Keurbos	Gen. et sp. nov	Valid	Gabbott et al.	Ordovician (Hirnantian)	Soom Shale (Cedarberg Formation)	South Africa	An enigmatic euarthropod, the type species is K. susanae.	
Laeviglyphiulus	Gen. et sp. nov	Valid	Wesener & Rühr	Cretaceous	Kachin amber	Myanmar	A millipede belonging to the family Cambalopsidae. The type species is L. patrickmuelleri.	
Liangshanella? qassutit	Sp. nov	Valid	Peel	Cambrian (Wuliuan)	Henson Gletscher Formation	Greenland	Originally described as a member of Bradoriida belonging to the family Svealutidae and possible species of Liangshanella; subsequently reinterpreted as a phosphatocopid belonging to the family Hesslandonidae and transferred to the genus Comleyopsis by Streng & Peel (2026).	
Metajapyx zhangi	Sp. nov	Valid	Sendra, Sánchez-García, Peñalver & Luan in Sendra et al.	Cretaceous (Albian-Cenomanian)	Kachin amber	Myanmar	A member of Diplura belonging to the family Japygidae, a species of Metajapyx.	
Oura	Gen. et sp. nov	Valid	O'Flynn, Williams & Liu	Cambrian Series 2, Stage 3	Chengjiang Konservat-Lagerstätte (Yu'anshan Formation)	China	A deuteropod, the type species is O. megale.	
Papiliomaris	Gen. et sp. nov	Valid	Anderson et al.	Silurian (Telychian)	Waukesha Biota (Brandon Bridge Formation)	United States (Wisconsin)	A bivalved arthropod of uncertain affinities. The type species is P. kluessendorfae.	
Protosiphonorhinus	Gen. et sp. nov	Valid	Moritz, Wipfler & Wesener	Cretaceous (Albian-Cenomanian)	Kachin amber	Myanmar	A millipede belonging to the family Siphonorhinidae. The type species is P. patrickmuelleri.	
Pseudagnostus powenaensis	Sp. nov	Valid	Laurie, Jago & Bischoff	Cambrian (Furongian)		Australia	A member of Agnostida.	
Tafilocaris	Gen. et sp. nov		García-Bellido & Gutiérrez-Marco	Ordovician (Sandbian)	First Bani Group	Morocco	A member of Nektaspida belonging to the family Emucarididae. The type species is T. ordovicica.	
Tardisia	Gen. et sp. nov	Valid	McCoy et al.	Upper Carboniferous (Moscovian)	Mazon Creek fossil beds	United States (Illinois)	A probable late surviving member of the Vicissicaudata within Artiopoda. The type species is T. broedeae	
Tasagnostus simpsoni	Sp. nov	Valid	Smith et al.	Cambrian (Miaolingian)	Tasman Formation	New Zealand	A member of Agnostida belonging to the family Diplagnostidae.	
Toledodiscus	Gen. et sp. nov		Collantes & Pereira	Cambrian Stage 4	Soleras Formation	Spain	A member of Agnostida belonging to the family Weymouthiidae. The type species is T. valverdi.	
Tuzoia isuelaensis	Sp. nov		Izquierdo-López et al.	Cambrian		Spain		
Zazrivacaris	Gen. et sp. nov	Valid	Gerbe, Hyžný & Schlögl	Early Jurassic (Toarcian)	Krempachy Marl Formation	Slovakia	A thylacocephalan. The type species is Z. jodorowskyi.	

- Collantes & Pates (2025) revise the holotype of Isoxys carbonelli and confirm placement of this species within the genus Isoxys.
- Nielsen et al. (2025) study changes of elongated cardinal spines of Isoxys volucris during its ontogeny, and argue that the studied spines had a primary defensive function.
- Chen, Lian & Wang (2025) describe fossil material of Houlongdongella disulcata and Houlongdongella elevata from the Cambrian Shuijingtuo Formation (Hubei, China), extending known geographical range of both taxa.
- Haridy et al. (2025) identify purported early vertebrate Anatolepis as an arthropod, and interpret its purported dentine tubules as sensory structures similar to those present in Cambrian aglaspidids and modern arthropods.
- A study on the morphology of cephalic appendages of Acanthomeridion serratum, providing evidence of probable adaptations to durophagy, is published by Wu et al. (2025).
- Evidence of the presence of two pairs of different compound eyes in Pygmaclypeatus daziensis (a pair of stalked, movable eyes and a pair of sessile dorsal eyes) is presented by Schmidt et al. (2025).
- O'Flynn et al. (2025) describe new fossil material of Kuamaia lata from the Cambrian Chiungchussu Formation (China), providing new information on the frontal appendages and number of head segments in members of this species, and interpret the studied fossils as indicating that raptorial frontal appendages, ancestral for Euarthropoda but lost in Artiopoda, evolved secondarily within the artiopod lineage that included K. lata.
- Redescription and a study on the affinities of Helmetia expansa is published by Losso, Caron & Ortega-Hernández (2025).
- Bicknell et al. (2025) describe fossil material of Naraoia cf. bertiensis from the Silurian (Přídolí) Phelps Member of the Fiddlers Green Formation (Bertie Group; New York, United States), expanding known geographical range of the youngest naraoiids.
- Naimark & Chaika (2025) study the structure of the cuticles of members of Agnostina, reporting evidence of greater similarity to cuticles of chelicerates than those of crustaceans.
- Liu et al. (2025) present new information on the morphology of Primicaris, interpreted as supporting a stem-group mandibulate affinity for marrellomorphs.
- Fossil material of Euthycarcinus cf. martensi representing the first known record of a member of Euthycarcinoidea from the Carboniferous-Permian strata of the Saar–Nahe Basin is described from the Remigiusberg Formation (Germany) by Poschmann et al. (2025).
- Brookfield, Catlos & Garza (2025) argue that the strata of the Stonehaven Group (United Kingdom) preserving fossil material of Pneumodesmus newmani is most likely Přídolí–Lochkovian in age.
- Dernov (2025) describes impressions of probable paratergites of Arthropleura sp. from the Carboniferous (Bashkirian) Mospyne Formation (Ukraine), possibly representing fossil material of juvenile specimens, and argues that juvenile and adult arthropleurids might have lived in different habitats.
- A study on the anatomy of Protosilvestria sculpta, based on data from specimens from the Quercy Phosphorites Formation and a new specimen from the Oligocene strata in the Montpellier region (France), is published by Charrondière et al. (2025).
- Laville et al. (2025) provide new information on the anatomy of Dollocaris ingens, and interpret thylacocephalans as the sister group of Malacostraca within Pancrustacea.
- Strausfeld et al. (2025) provide new information on the anatomy of visual systems and brain Jianfengia multisegmentalis, including information on its structured eyestalks and compound eyes, and study the phylogenetic affinities of Jianfengia, interpreting it as unrelated to short-bodied "great appendage" leanchoiliids (recovered as the sister taxon of the total group of Chelicerata) and representing a sister taxon of the total group of Mandibulata.

== General research ==
- Chipman (2025) proposes a new model for the evolution of arthropod tagmata based on data from extant and fossil arthropods.
- Lindgren et al. (2025) study the fossilization process of arthropod compound eyes on the basis of data from Cretaceous crab fossils from Weno and Pawpaw formations (Texas, United States) and extant sesarmid crabs, providing evidence that fossilization can change the original composition of the studied structures and their physicochemical properties.
- Scratch marks assigned to the ichnotaxon Monomorphichnus, representing the oldest fossil evidence of arthropods (possibly trilobites) in the Cambrian sedimentary series of Normandy (France) reported to date are described from the Terreneuvian strata from the Rozel Cape by Charrondière, Néraudeau & Gendry (2025).
- Westrop & Landing (2025) revise the composition of the assemblage of middle Cambrian trilobites and agnostids from the MacLean Brook Group (Cape Breton Island, Nova Scotia, Canada).
- Naimark & Sizov (2025) study the taphonomy of the Cambrian arthropod fossils from the Kimiltei site (Irkutsk Oblast, Russia) first reported by Naimark, Sizov & Khubanov (2023), and argue that the identification of putative members of Offacolidae and Chasmataspidida from this locality as chelicerates is correct.
- Evidence from the study of damage of medullosalean foliage from the Carboniferous strata from the Nord-Pas-de-Calais Coalfield (France), indicating that the studied plant provided food resources for diverse arthropod groups using multiple feeding strategies, is presented by Molina-Solís et al. (2025).
- Probable burrows of arthropods (possibly insect larvae) feeding on plant roots, as well as their fossilized fecal pellets, are described from the Middle-Upper Triassic strata in Somerset (United Kingdom) by Howson, Tucker & Whitaker (2025).
- Le Cadre et al. (2025) report the discovery of a bristly millipede very similar to extant Polyxenus lagurus and two member of an extinct mite lineage (Glaesacarus rhombeus) in a single piece of the Eocene Baltic amber, providing evidence of shared habitat of the studied arthropods and possible evidence of bradytely in bristly millipedes.
- The family Sunellidae is assigned to the order Isoxyida.
- Muscioni et al. (2025) revise the arthropod assemblage from the Villaggio del Pescatore Lagerstätte (Italy), identify palaemonid, cirolanid and possible heteropteran insect fossil material, and interpret the studied fossils as indicative of presence of a coastal, marginal environment during the Campanian.
- Tello et al. (2025) revise the fossil record of insects, arachnids and a putative myriapods from Chile.
