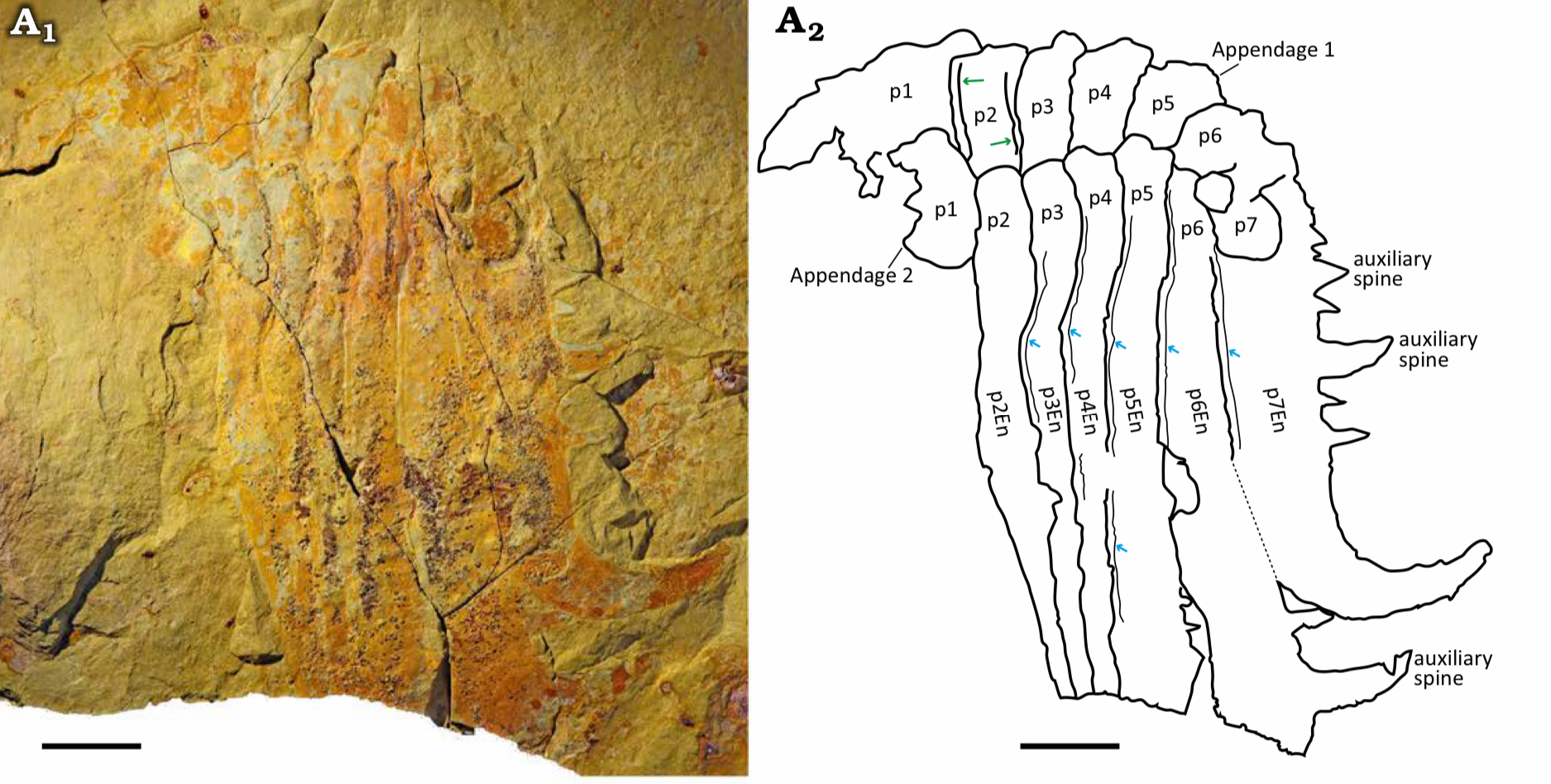
- Fossil and interpretive drawing of the holotype, a frontal appendage

Scientific classification
- Kingdom: Animalia
- Stem group: Arthropoda
- Class: †Dinocaridida
- Order: †Radiodonta
- Family: †Hurdiidae
- Genus: †Falciscaris; Potin et al., 2025
- Species: †F. mumakiana

Binomial name
- †Falciscaris mumakiana Potin et al., 2025

= Falciscaris =

Falciscaris Temporal range: late Cambrian–Early Ordovician, Jiangshanian–Tremadocian

Genus of hurdiid radiodont

Falciscaris is an extinct genus of hurdiid radiodont. The genus contains a single species, Falciscaris mumakiana, best known from the Early Ordovician (Tremadocian stage) Fezouata Formation of Morocco. A specimen assigned to the genus is also known from the upper Cambrian (Jiangshanian) Sandu Formation of China. This age is quite young compared to most other radiodonts, which are predominantly known from the Cambrian. The genus is also particularly large compared to most other radiodonts, at a meter in length or more. Falciscaris was a benthivore (animal that hunted for prey on the seafloor) that lived alongside even larger and more numerous suspension-feeding hurdiids belonging to the subfamily Aegirocassisinae.

== Material ==
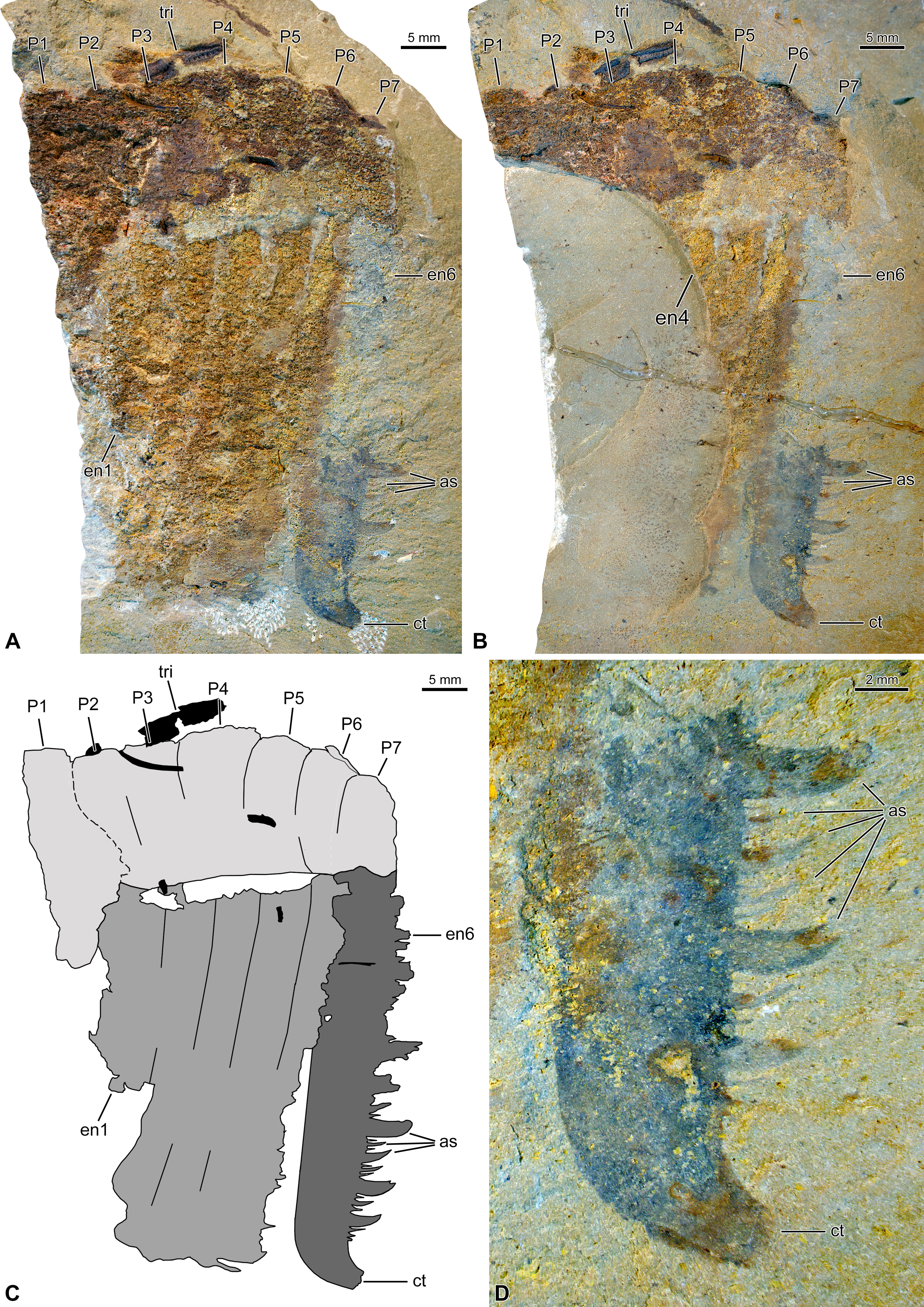
Fossil of F. cf. mumakiania from the Sandu Formation

Eight specimens of Falciscaris are known. Seven of these, all assigned to F. mumakiana, were discovered in the Fezouata Shale of Morocco, while one specimen assigned to Falciscaris cf. mumakiana was discovered in the older Sandu Formation of China. All described specimens consist exclusively of frontal appendages.

== Etymology ==
The generic name, Falciscaris, is derived from the Latin word falx, meaning 'scythe', in reference to the curved endites, and the Greek word caris, meaning 'crab'. The specific name, "mumakiana", refers to the mûmak, a fictional elephant-like animal from The Lord of the Rings, alluding to the resemblance between the tusks of this animal and the endites of Falciscaris.

== Description ==
=== Frontal appendage ===
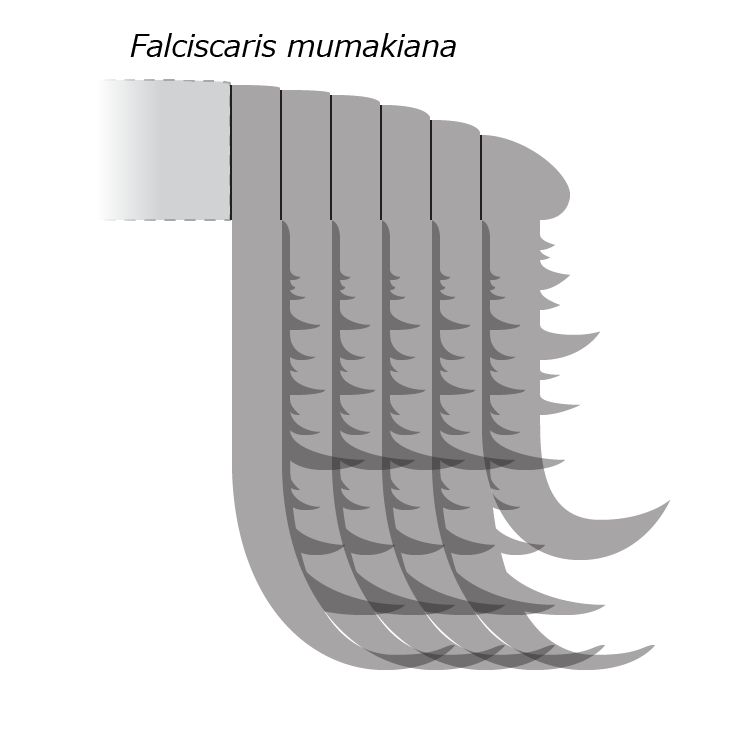
Diagram of the frontal appendage of Falciscaris

The appendages of Falciscaris have at least seven podomeres. These are divided into proximal, intermediate, and distal sections. It bears endites on at least the five podomeres (segments) of the intermediate region and the single podomere of the distal region. The endites are highly curved at the tips and bear auxiliary spines in three or more distinct sizes. The podomeres lack dorsal spines.

=== Size ===
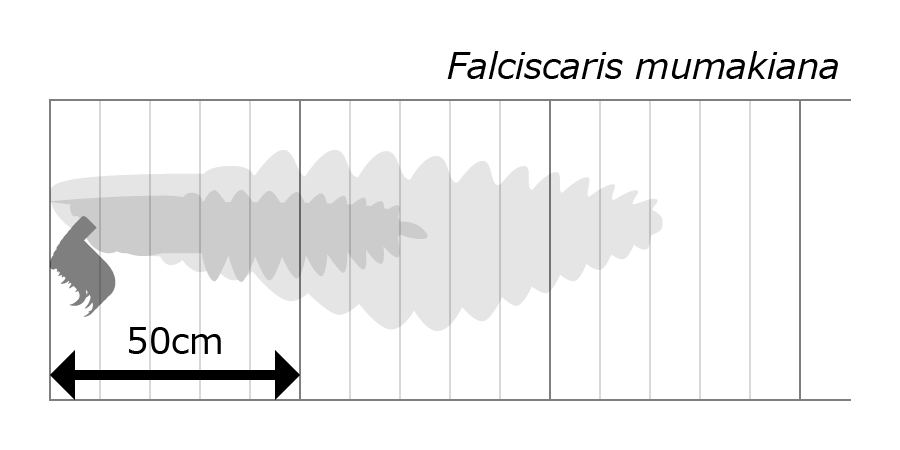
Upper and lower size estimations of Falciscaris

Falciscaris was possibly over 1 metre (3.3 ft) long, with size estimates ranging from 70–122.5 cm (27.6–48.2 in). These estimates were based on comparisons of the preserved Falsicaris material with the similar elements in more complete taxa. The upper estimates were based on the proportions of Peytoia, while the lower estimates are derived from Hurdia. This makes it significantly larger than most radiodonts, though some, including the coeval aegirocassisines, such as Aegirocassis, were larger.

== Paleobiology and paleoecology ==
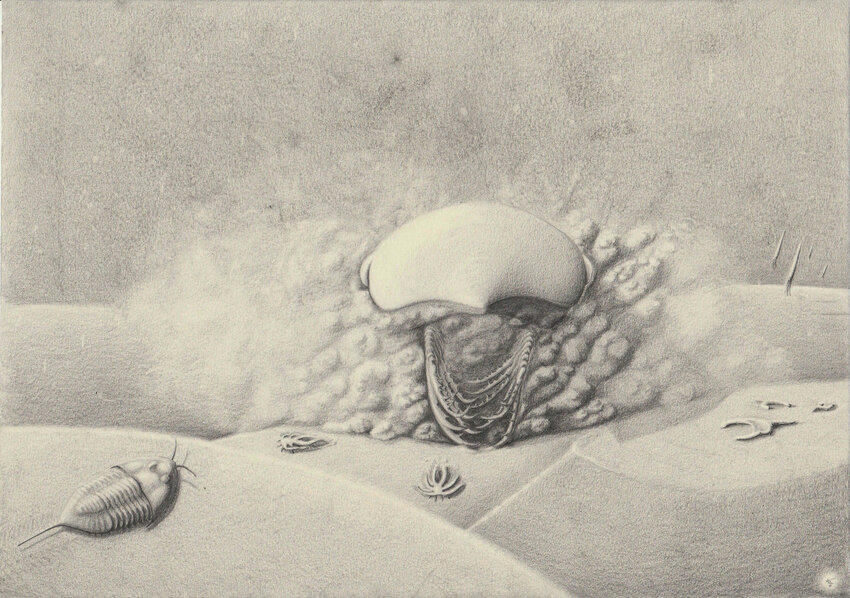
Speculative life restoration of Falciscaris. Since only frontal appendages are known, the remainder of the anatomy is inferred from related taxa.

The robust auxiliary spines of Falciscaris' suggest it may have been a benthivore, using its appendages to capture prey in sediment on the sea floor. The spacing and robustness of the spines may furthermore indicate that Falciscaris was a "macrobenthivore", capturing larger prey than microbenthivorous hurdiids like Titanokorys.

Falciscaris coexisted with other radiodonts, such as Aegirocassis benmoulai, Pseudoangustidontus dupleospineus, and Pseudoangustidontus izdigua. All three of these species were suspension-feeders belonging to the subfamily Aegirocassisinae. These taxa were seemingly much more numerous than Falciscaris, in addition to their larger size. They may have taken advantage of the abundant new planktonic organisms that appeared during the "Ordovician Plankton Revolution". This may have also benefitted benthivores, such as Falciscaris, since pelagic-benthic coupling may have contributed to a diverse benthic fauna for taxa like Falciscaris to exploit. The Ordovician Plankton Revolution is therefore thought to have been a major factor influencing the evolution of both suspension-feeding radiodonts, like the aegirocassisines, and benthivores, like Falciscaris.

=== Growth ===
All seven specimens of F. mumakiana are almost identical in morphology, yet the largest are almost 10 times larger than the smallest, suggesting multiple ontogenetic stages are represented. The similar morphology between ontogenetic stages suggests that F. mumakiana grew isometrically, similar to the growth observed in Amplectobelua symbrachiata and Stanleycaris hirpex.
