= Quilon (disambiguation) =

Quilon may refer to,

- Venad kingdom, a former state on India's south western Malabar Coast, alternatively known as the State of Quilon
- Kollam, a city in Kerala state, India, formerly Quilon
- Kollam district, in Kerala state, India encompassing the former city of Quilon
- Quilon formation, Geologic formation in India
- Quilon Restaurant, a Michelin starred restaurant in London
- Quilon, a non-stick chemical solution used in the production of parchment paper

== See also ==
- Quillon (disambiguation)
- Kollam (disambiguation)
- Venad (disambiguation)
