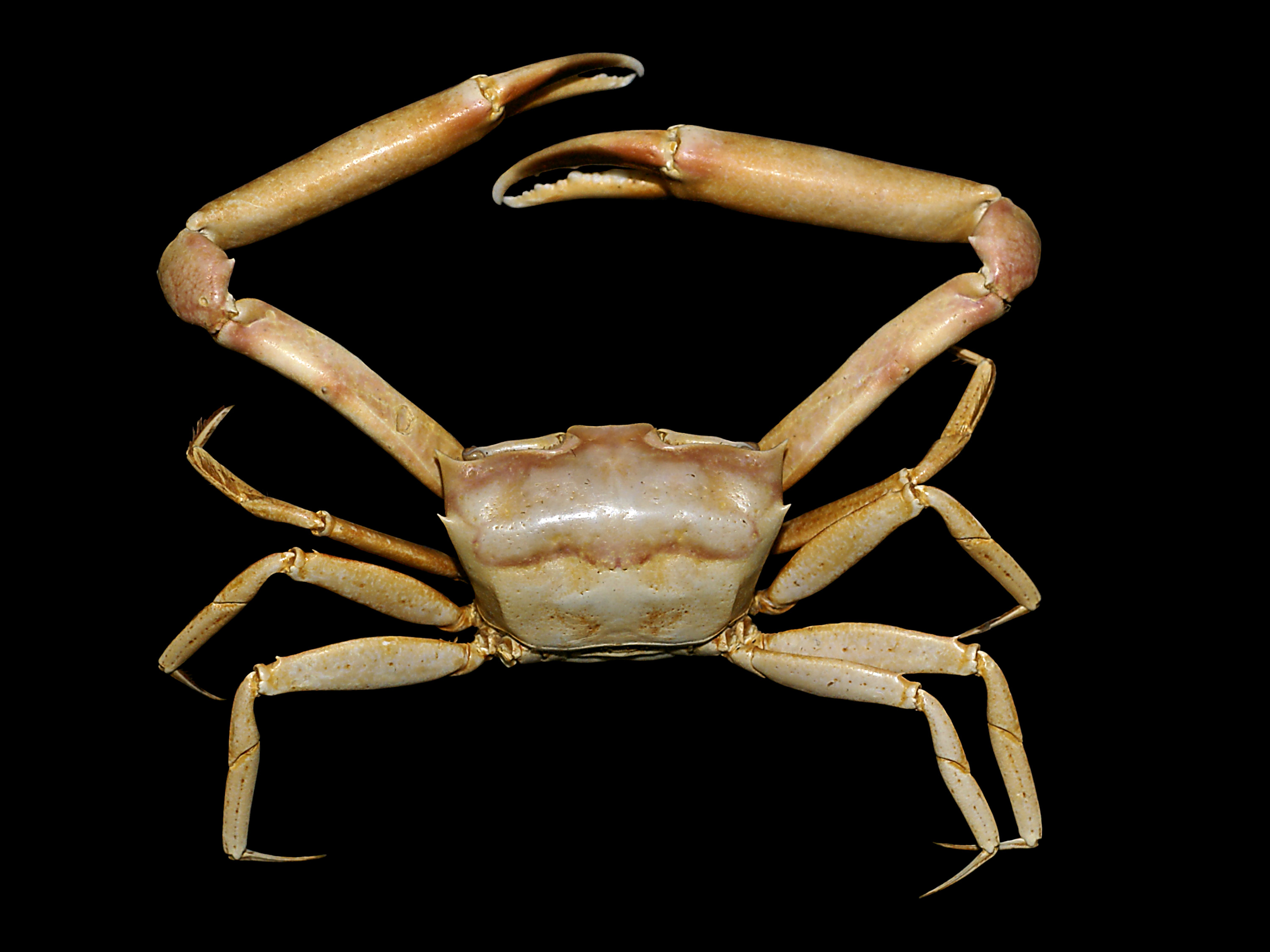

Scientific classification
- Kingdom: Animalia
- Phylum: Arthropoda
- Class: Malacostraca
- Order: Decapoda
- Suborder: Pleocyemata
- Infraorder: Brachyura
- Family: Goneplacidae
- Genus: Goneplax
- Species: G. rhomboides

Binomial name
- Goneplax rhomboides (Linnaeus, 1758)

= Goneplax rhomboides =

Species of crab

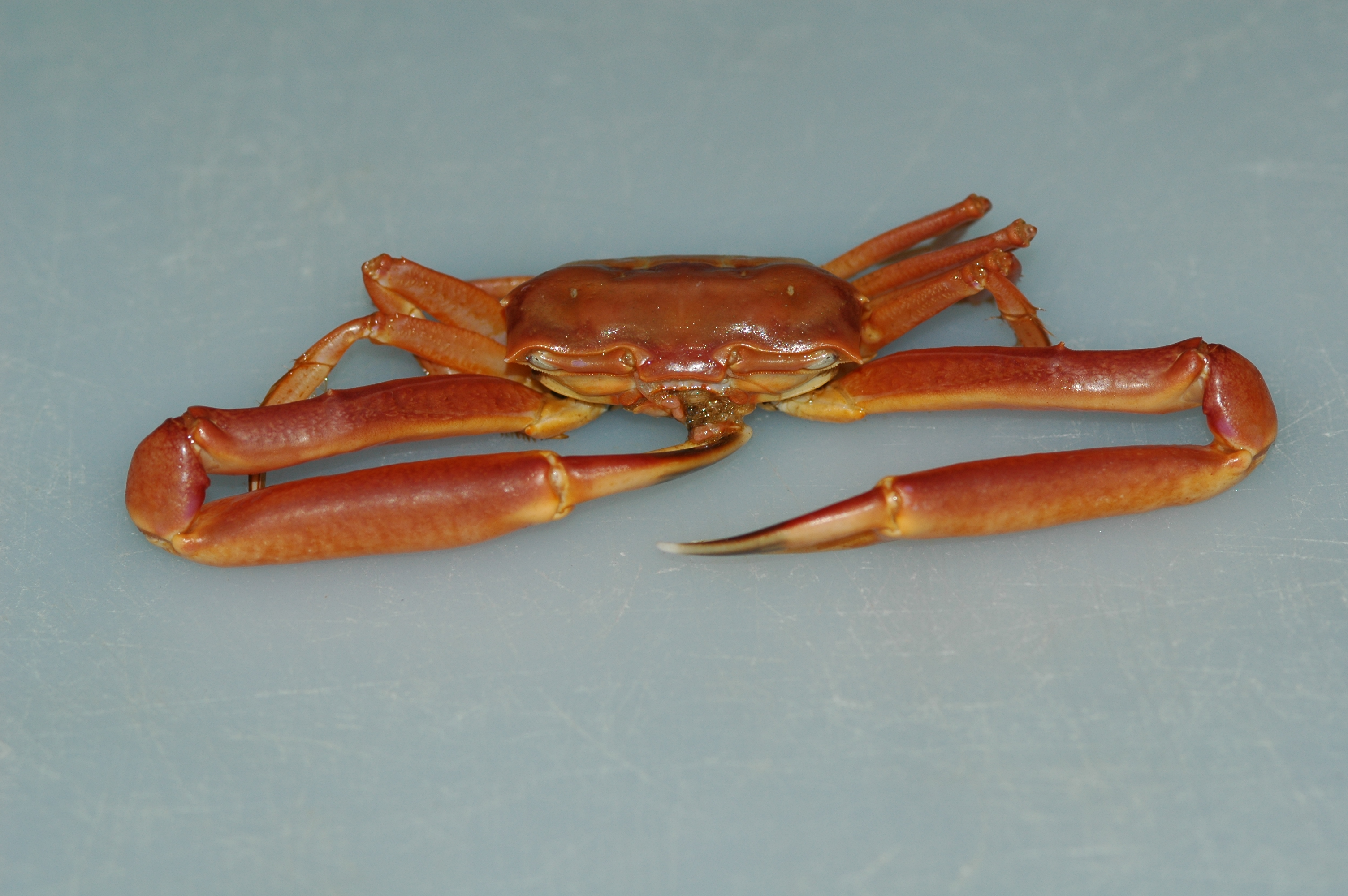

Goneplax rhomboides is a species of crab. It is known by the common name angular crab because of its angular carapace. Although it is also called the square crab, its shell is in fact more trapezoidal than square (or rhomboidal, as its scientific name might suggest). This species is also known as the mud-runner because they are able to run away quickly when threatened.

== Description ==
Goneplax rhomboides is a relatively small (carapace up to 3.7 cm or 1.5 in in diameter), distinctive-looking crab that ranges from yellowish-white, to orange, to reddish to vivid pink in colour. It has a smooth, quadrangular, strongly convex carapace that is much broader than it is long. It has long, slender pereiopods with margins of propodus and dactylus bristles. It likewise has setae on its antennae and mouthparts.

Females have short chelipeds but the chelipeds of males are long, with the merus portion of the claw considerably longer than the length of their carapace. G. rhomboides has often been confused with G. clevai, a similar species sharing at least part of its range. Its eyes are on the end of long, retractable eyestalks.

== Distribution and habitat ==
G. rhomboides is found in the northeastern Atlantic Ocean and the Mediterranean Sea from the North Sea to southern Africa and the Indian Ocean coast of South Africa. Waters off Shetland constitute the northern boundary of its range, and in 2008, marine biologists from the University of Gothenburg discovered one intact in the stomach of a cod caught off the coast of Bohuslän which suggests that G. rhomboides has now moved into Swedish waters. A similar discovery a few weeks later in the same location reinforces this conclusion.

This species inhabits muddy habitats similar to those favoured by the Norway lobster and burrows into inshore muddy sand. Its burrows often interconnect in complex patterns with those inhabited by other species of burrowing megafauna such as Callianassa subterranea, Cepola macrophthalma, Lesueurigobius friesii, and Nephrops norvegicus. These multi-species burrow complexes are very common in some localities.

== Symbiosis ==
The setae on the antennae, mouthparts and legs of G. rhomboides are home to Triticella flava, a species of Bryozoa ("moss animal"). The short lifespan of these symbiotic moss animals is synchronized so that they produce larvae just before G. rhomboides moults. These larvae then attach to the crab's newly emerged exoskeleton.
