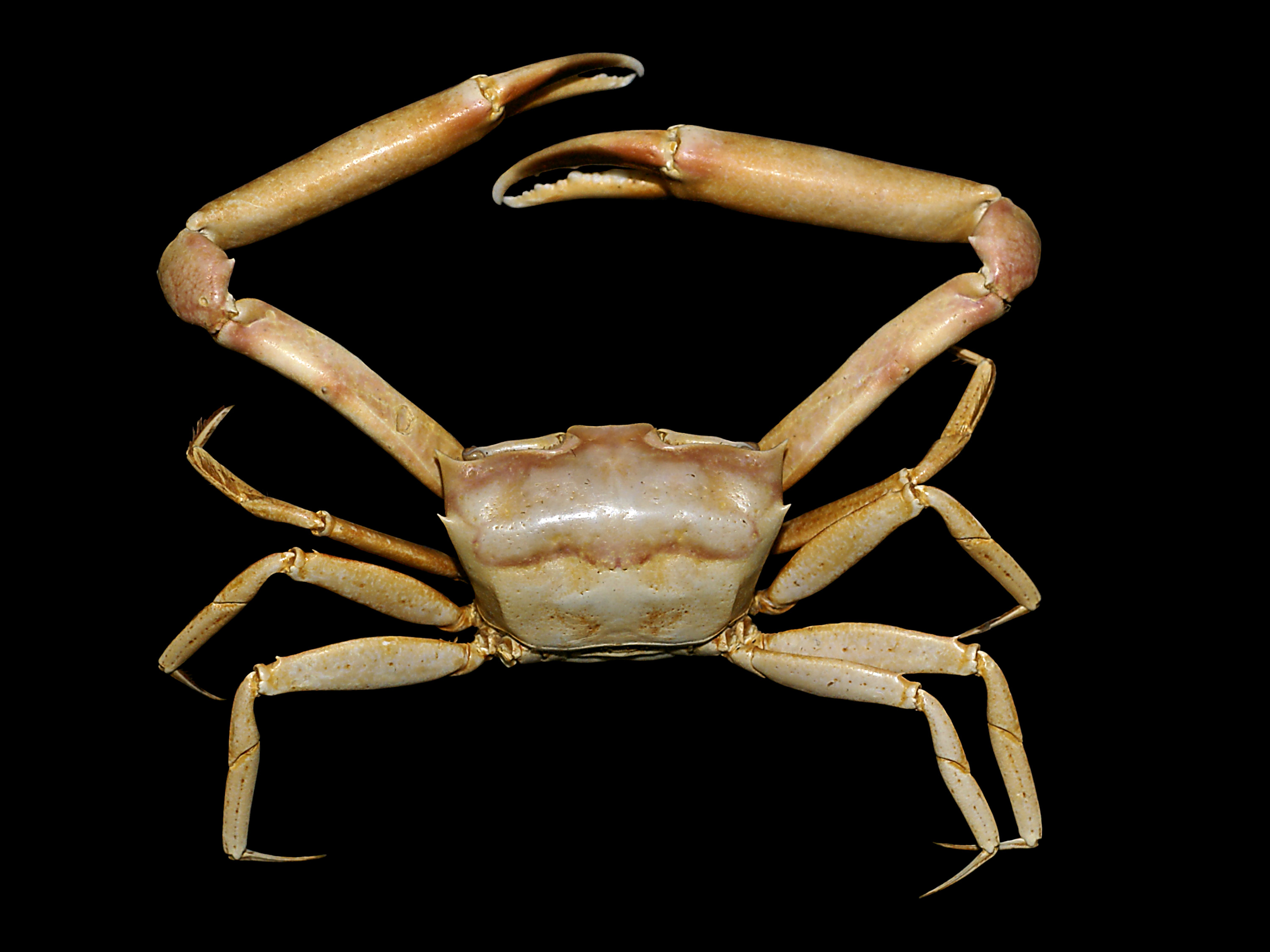
- Goneplax rhomboides

Scientific classification
- Kingdom: Animalia
- Phylum: Arthropoda
- Class: Malacostraca
- Order: Decapoda
- Suborder: Pleocyemata
- Infraorder: Brachyura
- Family: Goneplacidae
- Genus: Goneplax; Leach, 1814

Synonyms
- Gonoplax Leach, 1816

= Goneplax =

Goneplax Temporal range: Miocene–Recent

Genus of crabs

Goneplax is a genus of crabs, containing the following extant species:

- Goneplax barnardi (Capart, 1951)
- Goneplax clevai Guinot & Castro, 2007
- Goneplax rhomboides (Linnaeus, 1758)
- Goneplax sigsbei (A. Milne-Edwards, 1880)

A further five species are also known from the fossil record, dating from the Miocene onwards.
