= Icriocarcinus =

Icriocarcinus Temporal range: Campanian/Maastrichtian

Scientific classification
- Kingdom: Animalia
- Phylum: Arthropoda
- Class: Malacostraca
- Order: Decapoda
- Suborder: Pleocyemata
- Infraorder: Brachyura
- Family: Goneplacidae
- Genus: †Icriocarcinus; Bishop, 1988
- Species: †I. xestos

Binomial name
- †Icriocarcinus xestos Bishop, 1988

Extinct genus of crabs

Icriocarcinus is an extinct genus of crab from the Maastrichtian or Campanian of Baja California, Mexico, and Merced County, California, United States.
