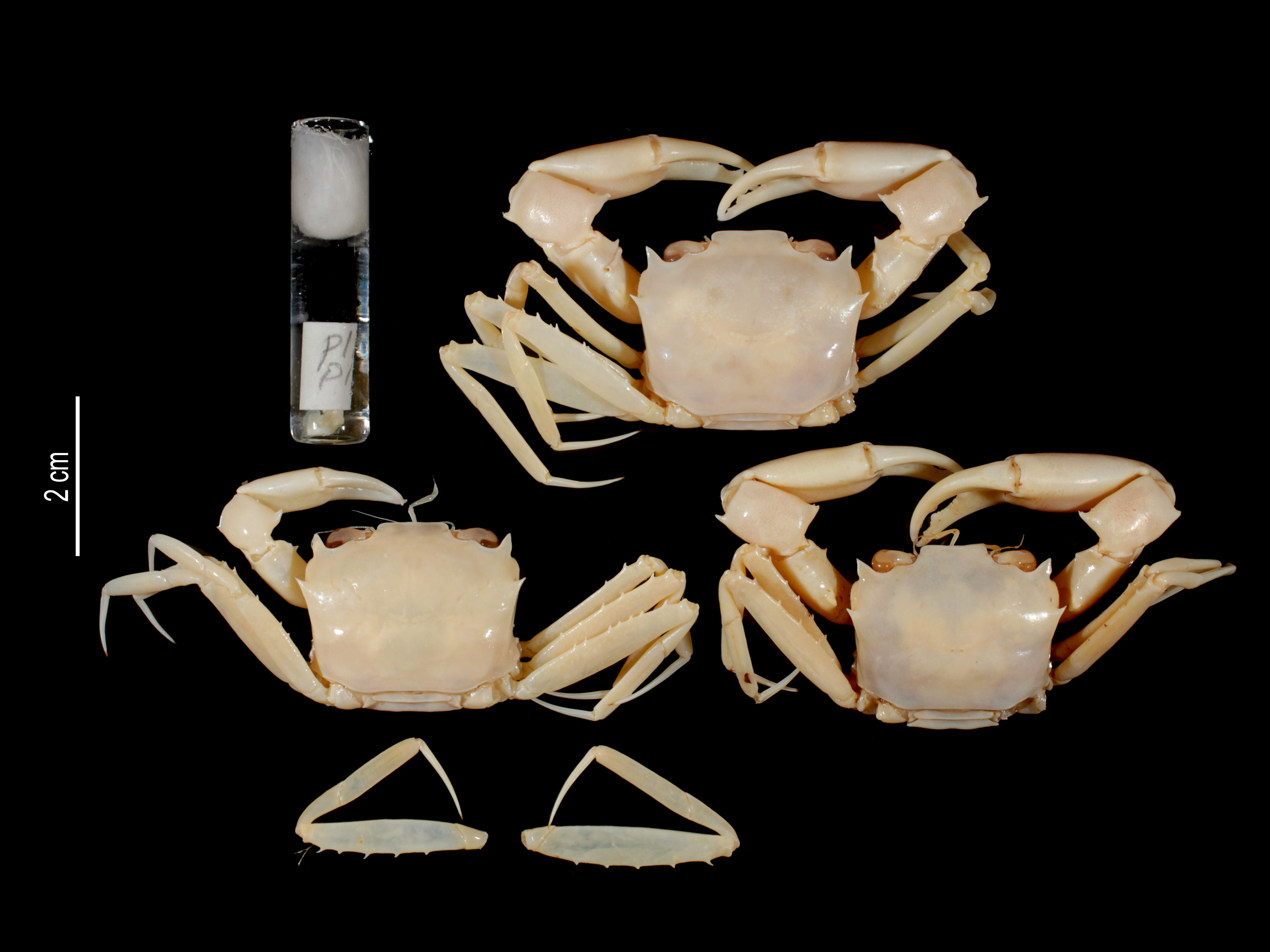
- Psopheticus crosnieri

Scientific classification
- Domain: Eukaryota
- Kingdom: Animalia
- Phylum: Arthropoda
- Class: Malacostraca
- Order: Decapoda
- Suborder: Pleocyemata
- Infraorder: Brachyura
- Family: Goneplacidae
- Genus: Psopheticus; Wood-Mason, 1892

Type species
- Psopheticus stridulans

= Psopheticus =

Genus of crabs

Goneplax is a genus of crabs, in the family Goneplaceidae, containing the following extant species:

- Psopheticus crosnieri Guinot, 1990
- Psopheticus musicus Guinot, 1990
- Psopheticus stridulans Wood-Mason, 1892
- Psopheticus vocans Guinot, 1985

A further species (Psopheticus shujenae) is known from the fossil record (as is also Psopheticus stridulans), dating from 0.012 Ma onwards.

It was first described in 1892 by James Wood-Mason.
