= Venad (disambiguation) =

The Venadu kingdom was a medieval/early modern state in southern India.

Venad(u) may also refer to:

- Venad Express, a train operating in Kerala, India
- Venadu, Tada mandal, Andhra Pradesh, India

== See also ==
- Quilon (disambiguation)
