= Quillon (disambiguation) =

A quillon is either of two transverse projections forming a simple crossguard of a sword, or the crossguard as a whole.

Quillon may also refer to:

- Quillón, a commune and city in Chile

== See also ==
- Quilon (disambiguation)
- Quillion, a fictional crystal from The Sword of Truth series
- Squillion, an example of an indefinite and fictitious number
