= Kollam (disambiguation) =

Kollam may refer to:

== City in Kerala, India ==
- Kollam, a city in Kerala, India
  - Kollam district, a district in Kerala
  - Kollam metropolitan area
  - Kollam Assembly constituency
  - Kollam Lok Sabha constituency
  - Kollam Municipal Corporation
  - Kollam Development Authority
- Kollam Port

== People with the name ==
- Kollam Thulasi (born 1949), Indian actor in Malayalam cinema
- Kollam G. K. Pillai (1934–2016), Indian actor in Malayalam cinema
- Ajith Kollam (1962–2018), Indian actor in Malayalam cinema

== See also ==
- Quilon (disambiguation)
- Malayalam Calendar, or the Kollam Era
- Kolam, Indian drawing on the ground using rice flour
