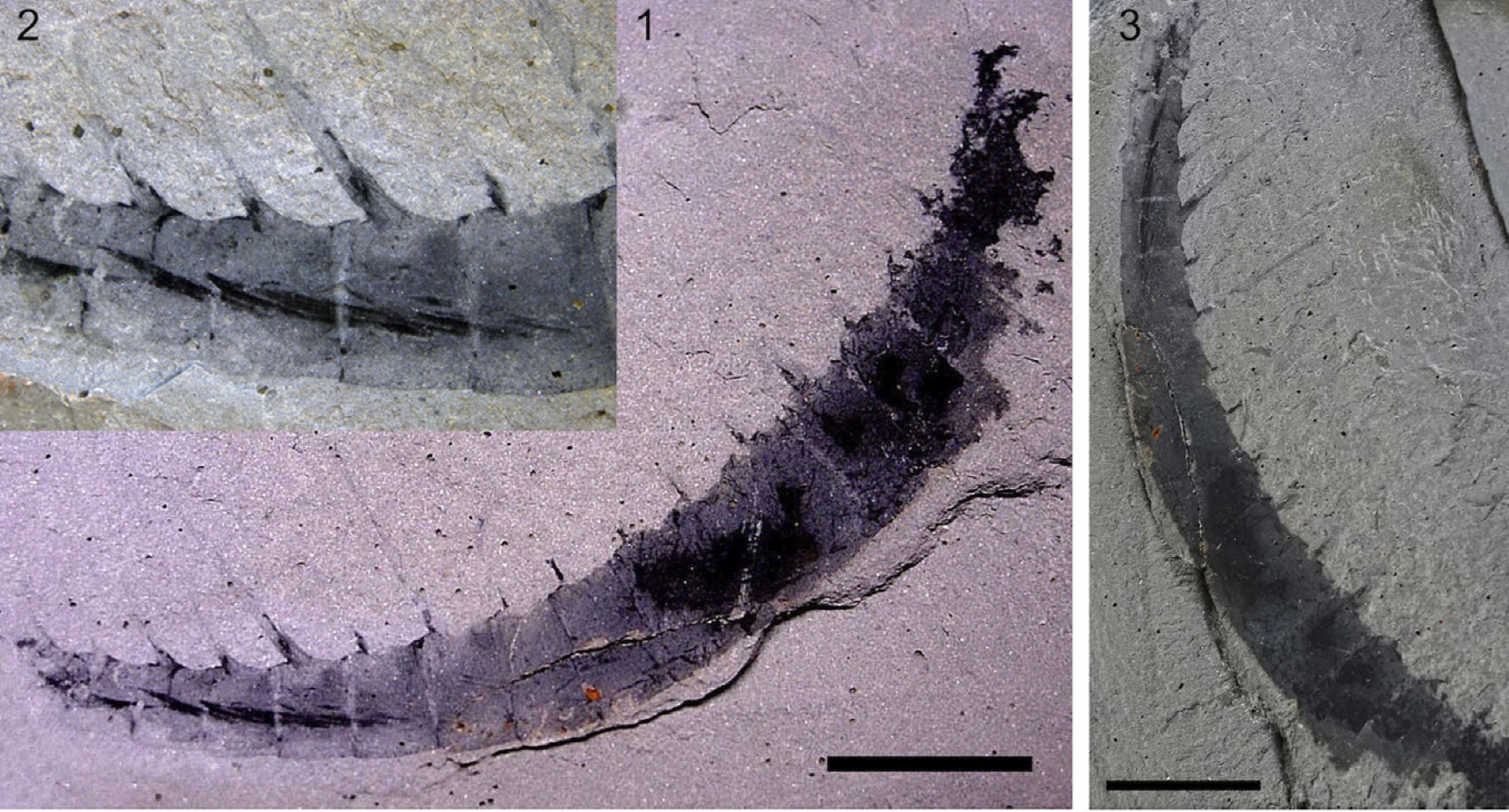
- Holotype of Verrocaris kerrymatti
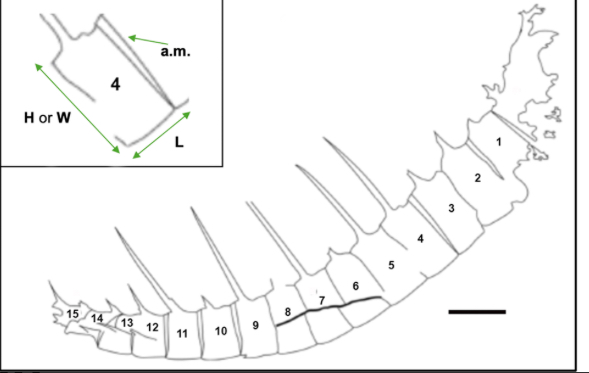
- Interpretive drawing of the holotype

Scientific classification
- Kingdom: Animalia
- Stem group: Arthropoda
- Class: †Dinocaridida
- Order: †Radiodonta
- Family: †Anomalocarididae
- Genus: †Verrocaris; Oxman et al., 2025
- Species: †V. kerrymatti

Binomial name
- †Verrocaris kerrymatti Oxman et al., 2025

= Verrocaris =

Verrocaris Temporal range: Cambrian Stage 4

Genus of radiodont arthropods

Verrocaris is an extinct genus of radiodont of the family Anomalocarididae from the Kinzers Formation (Cambrian Stage 4), located in Pennsylvania, United States. The genus contains a single species, Verrocaris kerrymatti, which may be an intermediate between bottom-feeding anomalocaridids and the suspension-feeding radiodont Tamisiocaris.

== Discovery and naming ==
Verrocaris is known from two specimens: the holotype, NMNS P-A-2300, and a referred specimen, USNM PAL 90827 (part) and NMNS P-A 388 (counterpart), both of which consist exclusively of frontal appendages. The referred specimen was previously referred to Tamisiocaris aff. borealis. Both specimens were discovered in the outcrops of the Kinzers Formation in Lancaster County, Pennsylvania.

The genus name, Verrocaris, comes from the Latin verrere, meaning "to sweep", and caris, meaning "crab". The specific name, kerrymatti, honours Kerry D. Matt.

== Description ==
The frontal appendage is divided into a peduncle and a distal articulated region. The peduncle is composed of a single podomere, while the distal articulated region is composed of 15 podomeres. The endites are long and lack auxiliary spines. They do not alternate in length like the endites of Anomalocaris and Lenisicaris do.

Verrocaris may be an intermediate form between other anomalocaridids, which may have been bottom-feeders, and taxa like Tamisiocaris, which were suspension feeders.

== Paleobiology ==
Verrocaris likely preyed on worm-like organisms living in loose substrate on the seafloor, which were probably consumed using suction. The frontal appendages may have been used to brush away sediment that was covering prey.
