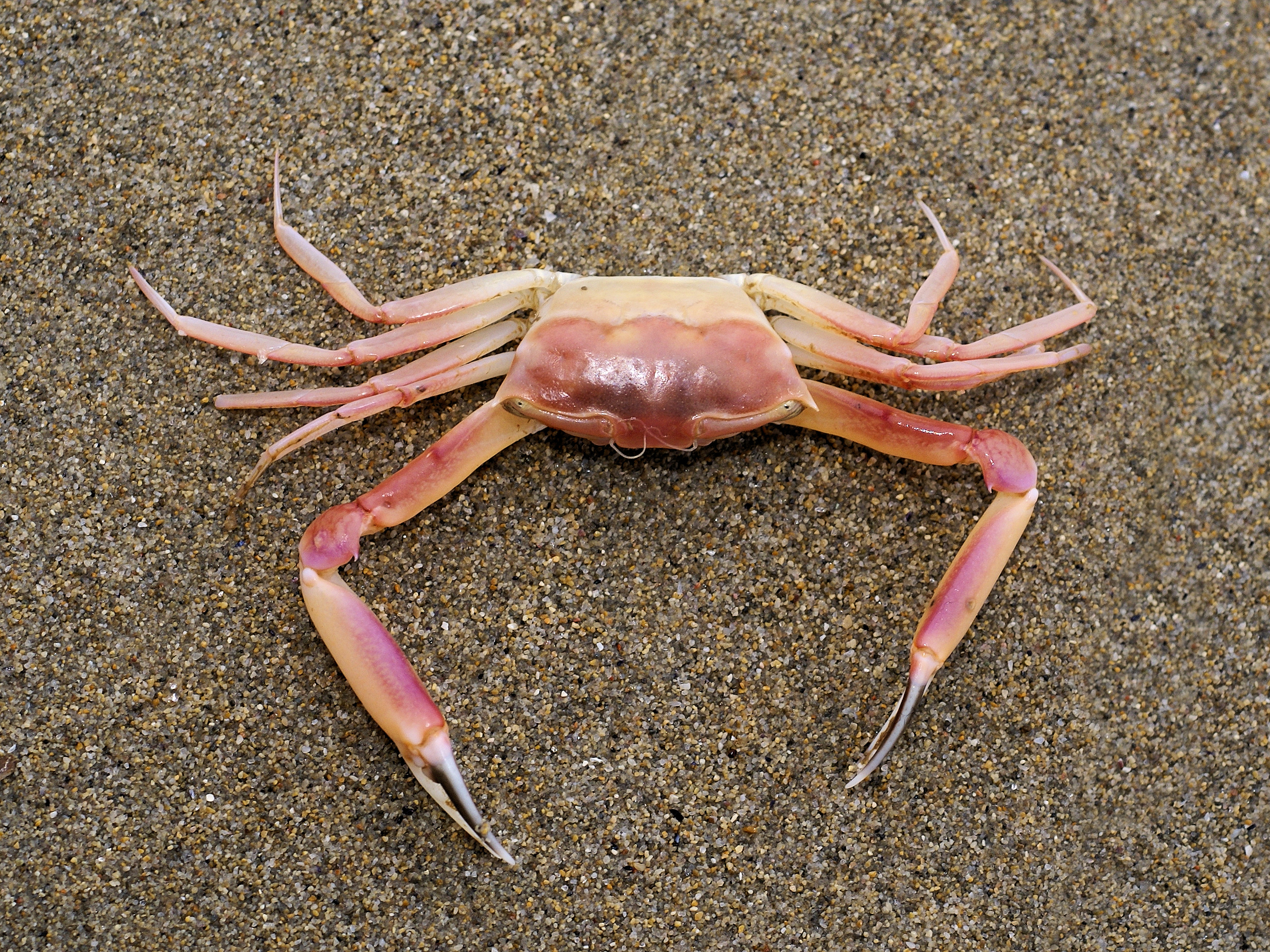
- Goneplax rhomboides

Scientific classification
- Kingdom: Animalia
- Phylum: Arthropoda
- Clade: Pancrustacea
- Class: Malacostraca
- Order: Decapoda
- Suborder: Pleocyemata
- Infraorder: Brachyura
- Section: Eubrachyura
- Subsection: Heterotremata
- Superfamily: Goneplacoidea
- Family: Goneplacidae; Macleay, 1838

Synonyms
- Carcinoplacinae H. Milne-Edwards, 1852; Bathyplacinae Števčić, 2005; Notonycidae Števčić, 2005; Psopheticini Števčić, 2005

= Goneplacidae =

Goneplacidae Temporal range: Eocene–Recent

Family of crabs

Goneplacidae is a family of crabs of the order Decapoda and the superfamily Goneplacoidea. It includes the following genera:

- † Amydrocarcinus Schweitzer, Feldmann, Gonzáles-Barba & Vega, 2002
- Bathyplax A. Milne-Edwards, 1880
- Carcinoplax H. Milne-Edwards, 1852
- Entricoplax Castro, 2007
- Exopheticus Castro, 2007
- Goneplacoides Castro, 2007
- Goneplax Leach, 1814
- Hadroplax Castro, 2007
- † Icriocarcinus Bishop, 1988
- † Kowaicarcinus Feldmann, Schweitzer, Maxwell & Kelley, 2008
- † Magyarcarcinus Schweitzer & Karasawa, 2004
- Menoplax Castro, 2007
- Microgoneplax Castro, 2007
- Neogoneplax Castro, 2007
- Neommatocarcinus Takeda & Miyake, 1969
- Notonyx A. Milne-Edwards, 1873
- Ommatocarcinus White, 1852
- Paragoneplax Castro, 2007
- Pedroplax Ng & Komai, 2011
- Psopheticus Wood-Mason, 1892
- Pycnoplax Castro, 2007
- Singhaplax Serène & Soh, 1976
