= Monomorphichnus =

Monomorphichnus Temporal range: 542.0-466.0 Ma

Trace fossil classification
- Domain: Eukaryota
- Kingdom: Animalia
- Phylum: Arthropoda
- Class: †Trilobita (?)
- Ichnogenus: †Monomorphichnus; Crimes 1970

Trace fossil

Monomorphichnus is an arthropod trace fossil known from the base of the Cambrian period onwards, before the first trilobite fossils.
