= Dinea =

Dinea Temporal range: 504.5–497 Ma Middle Cambrian

Scientific classification
- Kingdom: Animalia
- Phylum: Arthropoda
- Clade: †Artiopoda
- Class: †Trilobita
- Order: †Ptychopariida
- Family: †Asaphiscidae
- Genus: †Dinea; Westrop & Dengler, 2025

Type species
- Dinea bulla Westrop & Dengler, 2025

Species
- D. bulla Westrop & Dengler, 2025; D. convexa Westrop & Dengler, 2025; See Text

Genus of trilobites

Dinea is a genus of trilobite from the Cambrian-aged Shallow Bay Formation of Newfoundland, Canada.

== Taxonomy ==
Known specimens of Dinea were collected from the Cow Head region of the Great Northern Peninsula in Newfoundland, Canada by C.H. Kindle and H.B. Whittington, who discovered many other trilobites from the province. Geologically speaking, they hail from the Downes Point Member of the Shallow Bay Formation, dating to the Drumian and Guzhangian ages of the Middle Cambrian. At the time Dinea lived, 500 million years ago, it would have been a marine continental slope ecosystem.

These trilobites remains were described alongside others in 2025 by Stephen R. Westrop and Alyce A. Dengler, who established them as the new genus Dinea. Its type species is D. bulla and it also contains the species D. convexa, alongside possible additional species that remain unnamed. D. bulla straddles the boundary of the Drumian and Guzhangian, whereas all other specimens were deposited earlier in the Drumian. Both of species are known from multiple specimens of the cranidium, the core of the head, and D. bulla additionally known from a librigena, the side of the head. Its generic name is derived from Diné, the endonym of the Navajo people. The specific name D. bulla is derived from the Latin term bulla, meaning "bubble" or "swelling", while that of D. convexus is from the Latin convexus, meaning "arch" or "vault". One cranidium was noted as having distinct anatomy, indicating the existence of an additional species, but the authors refrained from naming it due to the lack of material and instead termed it Dinea sp. nov 1. The possibility it represented a different age of D. bulla was ruled out due to its similar size to specimens of that species. Two other specimens were not assigned to particular species, instead termed Dinea sp. 2 and Dinea sp. 3.

Though the glabellar inflation characteristic of Dinea was very similar to that seen in Onchonotopsis, other traits such as the long and flat anterior border indicate that it is unrelated. Instead, the Westrop and Dengler tentatively conclude it was related to Asaphiscus, which has a similar cranidium border and palpebral lobe, and that Dinea was therefore part of the family Asaphiscidae. This would indicate that inflated glabella convergently evolved in multiple contemporary lineages, rather than being unique to Onchonotopsidae as previously thought.

== Description ==
It is distinguished from other trilobites by the convex shape and large, inflated size of its glabella, a bulbous region of the cranidium containing the front of the digestive tract. Additional distinguishing features are the long preglabellar and preocular fields (the flat fronts of the head in front of glabella and eyes respectively) which slope into a flat border, as well as the long palpebral lobe (a ridge above the eyes). Such a large glabella may have evolved to expand the foregut, and it has been speculated this may have helped store low-quality food acquired in non-selective particle feeding.

The type species D. bulla has an especially inflated glaballa, occupying 70% of the length of the cranidium and possessing a spinose backward projection overhanging the occipital ring (a structure behind the glabella, connecting the head to the body). The combination of this inflated size and overhanging shape is unique to the species. The furrow between the glabella and occipital ring, the occipital furrow, is lost in the center. The frontal area, the flat plate in front of the glabella, consists of the remaining 30% of the cranidium. As in other trilobites, it's split between a preglabellar section and an anterior border by the anterior border furrow, which is well incised. The anterior border is two thirds the length of the preglabullar field.

D. convexus has a shorter glabella, only 60% of cranidial length. It is still inflated in size, rising well above the occipital ring. However, it lacks the spinous projection and therefore does not having over this ring, unlike D. bulla; the highest point is instead located around the middle of the glabella The occipital furrow is well incised all the way through, rather than reduced in the center. The frontal area is even longer than in D. bulla, and the preglabellar region comprises more of its length; the anterior border is only 35% the length of the preglabellar field. The anterior border furrow separating the two is far more shallow in this species, with the regions primarily distinguished by the abrupt sloping shape. An additional distinct trait of the species is the more strongly divergent nature of its anterior facial sutures.

The third, unnamed species of Dinea has a similar glabella to D. bulla, but does not extend as far backwards or come to the same blunt pointed endpoint. Similar to D. convexu, its occipital ring is completely separate from the glabella, with a clear incision, rather than partially fused through the midline as in D. bulla. The anterior border is especially long in this species, compromising the majority of the frontal area rather than being smaller than the preglabbelar region.
