= Benthic-pelagic coupling =

Processes that connect the benthic and pelagic zones of a body of water

Benthic-pelagic coupling are processes that connect the benthic zone and the pelagic zone through the exchange of energy, mass, or nutrients. These processes play a prominent role in both freshwater and marine ecosystems and are influenced by a number of chemical, biological, and physical forces that are crucial to functions from nutrient cycling to energy transfer in food webs.

== Description ==
The benthic and pelagic zones are interconnected through nutrient (nitrogen, phosphorus, and silicate) exchange from the sediment that helps fuel phytoplankton primary production in the water column, which in turn, provide organic substrate for regeneration in sediments by microbes and macrofauna. These exchanges have seasonal variability as temperature and light conditions that drive primary production and sedimentation patterns change. Accumulation of nutrients during winter months generally results in a strong peak in phytoplankton production in spring followed by a peak in sedimentation. In the summer, pelagic recycling of primary production is more efficient and sedimentation generally lower.

The depth of an aquatic ecosystem is a key factor for benthic-pelagic exchanges because it determines the proximity and degree of interactions between the two environments. Coupling is stronger in shallow waters, such as in lakes and in coastal areas because primary productivity is generally higher in these areas where a higher amount of fresh organic matter from either photosynthesis or fecal matter can reach the bottom to fuel benthic fauna, which in turn remineralize and respire organic matter that supplies essential nutrients for primary production at the surface. Stratification of the water column, whether by temperature or salinity, also regulates the degree of exchange between benthic and pelagic habitats.

Oxygen concentrations and biological interactions, such as predation and competition, will also influence benthic community structure and biomass. For example, benthic macrofauna, such as polychaetes and bivalves, are important food sources for demersal fish, including commercially important species such as flatfish and cod.

== Mechanisms ==
=== Organism movement ===
Diel vertical migrations (DVM) of fishes, zooplankton, and larger invertebrates, such as cephalopods and jellyfish, from the surface to the bottom can transfer nutrients and detritus from the pelagic zone to the benthos. Zooplankton, for example, vertically transport items such as organic carbon, nutrients, parasites, and food resources throughout the water column. Particulates (fecal pellets) and dissolved organic carbon produced by these organisms in the water column constitute marine snow, which supports microbial production at the benthos in what is known as the 'biological pump.'

These daily migrations are along a vertical gradient were movements are typically downward by day and an upward at night in response to several factors, such as predator avoidance, food availability, and light intensity.

Movement driven by life-history stages and feeding patterns also plays a role in benthic-pelagic coupling. Many aquatic organisms inhabit have both pelagic and benthic life stages, such as benthic macrofauna that have pelagic larval stages before settling on the sediment. Organisms who occupy both benthic and pelagic habitats as part of their life history help maintain adult populations and community structure, and serve as inputs essential for ecological interactions such as predation, competition, and parasitism.

Sediment-dwelling organisms are also involved in benthic-pelagic coupling by disturbing the sediment to feed on organic matter trapped between sediment grains or to hide from predators. This is known as bioturbation, which stimulates mineralization of organic matter and the release of nutrients (Hansen et al. 1998; Lohrer et al. 2004; D'Andrea and DeWitt 2009), thereby affecting the growth of phytoplankton in the pelagic zone (Welsh 2003). Bioturbation by macrofauna affects sediment permeability and water content, destabilizes chemical gradients, subducts organic matter, and influences rates of remineralization and inorganic nutrient flux.

Collectively, these outcomes are essential to habitat productivity and overall ecosystem function.

=== Trophic interactions ===
How organisms interact will also determine the degree of benthic-pelagic coupling. These interactions will differ based largely on the species involved. In both freshwater and marine ecosystems, there are benthic organisms that are preyed upon by both demersal and pelagic fish during various life stages. Benthic organisms can also prey upon pelagic species. Benthic suspension feeders, such as bivalves, can exert considerable grazing pressure on phytoplankton and microzooplankton. Thus, benthic and pelagic fauna can act as habitat couplers by consuming resources originating from either the water column or the sediment.

On rocky intertidal shores, the effects of nearshore currents on phytoplankton and sea star propagules influence the benthic community structure of mussels and predation pressure by sea stars.

Detritivores inhabiting benthic areas derive energy from sinking pelagic detritus and are then consumed by either benthic or pelagic predators, impacting community structure.

Benthic and pelagic domains are further linked by pelagic predators such as tuna and swordfish feeding also on demersal resources, while pelagic preys such as sardines and anchovies may feed demersal predators.

=== Biogeochemical cycling ===
The benthic biogeochemical processes are essentially driven by pelagic processes, fueled by the deposition of pelagic material (e.g., organic matter, calcium carbonate). In response, sediments transform the deposited material (such as through degradation and dissolution) back into nutrients available for uptake in the water column. Part of those products becomes available for bacterial and phytoplankton production that ultimately may sink to the seafloor to fuel the benthic communities again.

== Anthropogenic and climate change impacts ==
Anthropogenic pressures regulate benthic–pelagic coupling directly and indirectly through their effects on the physical (e.g., salinity, oxygen, temperature) and biological (e.g., species, communities, functional traits) components of ecosystems. In coastal and estuarine ecosystems, climate change, nutrient loading, and fishing have been shown to have direct effects on benthic–pelagic coupling with clear consequences for ecosystem function. For example, increased water temperatures in Narragansett Bay have caused shifts in the timing and a decrease in the magnitude of phytoplankton blooms. This has decreased the deposition of organic material to the benthos and ultimately reduced inorganic nutrient release from the sediment.

Projected changes in nutrients and salinity could have negative effects on the distribution and productivity of mussels and diminish their role in benthic–pelagic exchange. Overall, eutrophication results in an increase in phytoplankton biomass and blooms, altered phytoplankton community structure, and a decrease in benthic primary production.

== See also ==
- Marine food web
