= Quilon formation =

Geologic formation in India

The Quilon limestone formation is a geologic formation existing on the west coast of India. The Quilon formation, along with Warkalli formation represent sediments laid down in the Kerala basin that existed during Mio-pliocene times. The Quilon formation of the Miocene age is made up of limestone, and the Warkalli formation is made up of alternating beds of sand and shale exposed along the Varkala cliffs.

== Details ==
The facies of the fossiliferous Quilon Limestone in SW India is described for the first time in detail at the Padappakkara-type locality. It comprises at least 2 horizons of fossiliferous limestone with marine fauna. The lower limestone horizon is characterized by colonial corals, while the upper horizon represents a larger foraminiferal Pseudotaberina malabarica facies which is well developed at the type locality, the coastal cliffs of Ashtamudi Lake at Padappakkara in SW India. The age of the fossiliferous marl of the Quilon Formation is numerically constrained to between 17.08 and 17.13 with an error range of 0.22 Ma. The source of the lignite debris, noted for the first time in the Quilon beds, is postulated as an old unknown bed either underlying or having existed nearby, but later removed by erosion or diastrophism. The proximity of the source of the Quilon sediments is supported by the presence of graphite in the sediments.

Quilon Formation represents a rich fossil seagrass community, with proximity to a coral reef and mangroves. A diverse bony fish assemblage with numerous new species are reported from the marls exposed at the Pozhikkara locality of the Quilon Formation. This Formation also seems to record climatic events like Middle Miocene Climatic Optimum and Monterey Carbon Excursion.
