= 2018 in arthropod paleontology =

This list of fossil arthropods described in 2018 is a list of new taxa of trilobites, fossil insects, crustaceans, arachnids, and other fossil arthropods of every kind that were described during the year 2018, as well as other significant discoveries, and events related to arthropod paleontology occurring in 2018.

== General research ==
- A study on extant arthropods (mainly insects and spiders) living around the resinous tree Hymenaea verrucosa in the lowland coastal forest of Madagascar and trapped by the resin produced by this tree species, and on their implications for inferring whether amber records the true past biodiversity of the entire forest, is published by Solórzano Kraemer et al. (2018).
- A study on the early evolution of stem and crown-arthropods as indicated by Ediacaran and Cambrian body and trace fossils is published by Daley et al. (2018).
- A study on the evolution of ecdysozoan vision, focusing on the evolution of arthropod multi-opsin vision, as indicated by molecular data and data from fossil record, is published by Fleming et al. (2018).
- Grimaldi et al. (2018) report biological inclusions (fungi, plants, arachnids and insects) in amber from the Paleogene Chickaloon Formation of Alaska, representing the northernmost deposit of fossiliferous amber from the Cenozoic.
- A mantis lacewing larva found in association with two spiders, attached to one of the anterior walking legs of one of the spiders, is described from the Cretaceous amber from Myanmar by Haug, Müller & Haug (2018), who interpret this finding as evidence of palaeo-parasitism.

== Arachnids ==
=== Research ===
- Review of arachnids known from the Bitterfeld amber (Germany) and a study on their implications for inferring the age of this deposit is published by Dunlop et al. (2018).
- The first fossil representative of the parasitic mite family Pterygosomatidae, assigned to the genus Pimeliaphilus and similar in morphology to the extant species parasitic on cockroaches, is described from the Cretaceous (Albian) Archingeay amber (France) by Sidorchuk & Khaustov (2018).
- Fossil mite "Sejus" bdelloides, originally interpret as a member of Mesostigmata, is reinterpreted as a member of Prostigmata referrable to the group Anystina by Dunlop, Walter & Kontschán (2018).
- A study on the body size of fossil mites is published by Sidorchuk (2018).
- A hard tick wrapped in spider silk is described from the Cretaceous Myanmar amber by Dunlop et al. (2018).
- A male specimen of a tick belonging to the genus Ornithodoros and the subgenus (Alectorobius) is described from the Dominican amber by Estrada-Peña & de la Fuente (2018), who also provide illustrated interpretations intended to support the validity of the identity of the fossils reported by de la Fuente (2003).
- A pseudoscorpion attached to barbules of a contour feather, possibly documenting a phoretic association between pseudoscorpions and Mesozoic birds, is described from the Cretaceous amber from Myanmar by Xing, McKellar & Gao (2018).
- A study on the phylogenetic history of spiders, based on molecular data and re-examination of the global fossil record, as well as on the ancestral predatory strategies among different groups of spiders and some of the possible drivers of spider diversification during the Early Cretaceous greenhouse, is published by Shao & Li (2018).
- A study on the burrows produced by wolf spiders belonging to the genus Pavocosa, aiming to identify ichnological signatures which may facilitate identification of wolf spider burrows in the fossil record, is published by Mendoza Belmontes, Melchor & Piacentini (2018).
- Fossil crevice weaver Misionella didicostae from Dominican amber is transferred to the genus Antilloides by Magalhaes (2018).
- Evidence of a fossilized cobweb, and a possible case of predation of a theridiid spider on a dolichopodid fly, are reported from the Mexican amber by García-Villafuerte (2018).

=== New taxa ===
Name	Novelty	Status	Authors	Age	Unit	Location	Notes	Images
Alteraraneus	Gen. et sp. nov	Valid	Wunderlich in Wunderlich & Müller	Late Cretaceous (Cenomanian)	Burmese amber	Myanmar	A spider belonging to the group Araneoidea and to the family Zarqaraneidae. The type species is A. gracilipes.	
Alteruloborus	Gen. et sp. nov	Valid	Wunderlich in Wunderlich & Müller	Late Cretaceous (Cenomanian)	Burmese amber	Myanmar	A spider belonging to the group Deinopoidea and the new family Alteruloboridae. The type species is A. araneoides.	
Burerythrites	Gen. et sp. nov	Valid	Konikiewicz & Mąkol	Late Cretaceous (Cenomanian)	Burmese amber	Myanmar	A mite belonging to the family Erythraeidae. Genus includes new species B. pankowskii.	
Burfessonia	Gen. et sp. nov	Valid	Konikiewicz & Mąkol	Late Cretaceous (Cenomanian)	Burmese amber	Myanmar	A mite belonging to the family Smarididae. Genus includes new species B. maryae.	
Burmaforceps	Gen. et sp. nov	Valid	Wunderlich in Wunderlich & Müller	Late Cretaceous (Cenomanian)	Burmese amber	Myanmar	A spider belonging to the group Araneoidea and to the family Zarqaraneidae. The type species is B. amputatus.	
Burmascutum brevis	Sp. nov	Valid	Wunderlich in Wunderlich & Müller	Late Cretaceous (Cenomanian)	Burmese amber	Myanmar	A spider belonging to the group Araneoidea and to the family Burmascutidae.	
Burmasuccinus	Gen. et sp. nov	Valid	Wunderlich in Wunderlich & Müller	Late Cretaceous (Cenomanian)	Burmese amber	Myanmar	A spider belonging to the family Uloboridae. The type species is B. bulla.	
Burmatheridion	Gen. et sp. nov	Valid	Wunderlich in Wunderlich & Müller	Late Cretaceous (Cenomanian)	Burmese amber	Myanmar	A spider belonging to the family Theridiidae. The type species is B. sinespinae.	
Burphanolophus	Gen. et sp. nov	Valid	Konikiewicz & Mąkol	Late Cretaceous (Cenomanian)	Burmese amber	Myanmar	A mite belonging to the family Erythraeidae. Genus includes new species B. joergwunderlichi.	
Chaerilobuthus knodelorum	Sp. nov	Valid	Lourenço	Late Cretaceous (Cenomanian)	Burmese amber	Myanmar	A scorpion belonging to the family Chaerilobuthidae.	
Chimerarachne	Gen. et sp. nov	Valid	Wang et al.	Late Cretaceous (Cenomanian)	Burmese amber	Myanmar	An arachnid closely related to spiders and to the extinct group Uraraneida. Genus includes new species C. yingi.	
Converszarqaraneus	Gen. et sp. nov	Valid	Wunderlich in Wunderlich & Müller	Late Cretaceous (Cenomanian)	Burmese amber	Myanmar	A spider belonging to the group Araneoidea and to the family Zarqaraneidae. The type species is C. annulipedes.	
Cornicaraneus	Gen. et sp. nov	Valid	Wunderlich in Wunderlich & Müller	Late Cretaceous (Cenomanian)	Burmese amber	Myanmar	A spider belonging to the group Araneoidea and to the family Zarqaraneidae. The type species is C. scutatus.	
Crassitibia baculum	Sp. nov	Valid	Wunderlich in Wunderlich & Müller	Late Cretaceous (Cenomanian)	Burmese amber	Myanmar	A spider belonging to the group Araneoidea and to the family Zarqaraneidae.	
Cretaceoushormiops	Gen. et sp. nov	Valid	Lourenço	Late Cretaceous (Cenomanian)	Burmese amber	Myanmar	A scorpion belonging to the family Protoischnuridae. Genus includes new species C. knodeli.	
Cretamysmena	Gen. et sp. nov	Valid	Wunderlich in Wunderlich & Müller	Late Cretaceous (Cenomanian)	Burmese amber	Myanmar	A spider belonging to the group Araneoidea and to the new family Cretamysmenidae. The type species is C. fontana.	
Eothrombium fortesambiense	Sp. nov	Valid	Mąkol, Konikiewicz & Klug	Eocene	Baltic amber	Europe (Baltic Sea region)	A mite belonging to the group Prostigmata and to the family Tanaupodidae.	
Eotibiaapophysis	Gen. et sp. nov	Valid	Wunderlich in Wunderlich & Müller	Late Cretaceous (Cenomanian)	Burmese amber	Myanmar	A spider of uncertain phylogenetic placement, originally assigned to the family Uloboridae, but subsequently reinterpreted as a member of an early branch of the RTA clade. The type species is E. reliquus.	
Frateruloborus	Gen. et sp. nov	Valid	Wunderlich in Wunderlich & Müller	Late Cretaceous (Cenomanian)	Burmese amber	Myanmar	A spider belonging to the group Deinopoidea and the new family Frateruloboridae. The type species is F. bulbosus.	
Galianora marcoi	Sp. nov	Valid	García-Villafuerte	Miocene (Aquitanian)	Mexican amber	Mexico	A jumping spider, a species of Galianora	
Haemaphysalis (Alloceraea) cretacea	Sp. nov	Valid	Chitimia-Dobler, Pfeffer & Dunlop	Late Cretaceous (Cenomanian)	Burmese amber	Myanmar	A tick. Originally described as a species of Haemaphysalis, subsequently recombined as a species of Alloceraea.	
Immensmaris	Gen. et sp. nov	Valid	Dunlop, Frahnert & Mąkol	Late Cretaceous (Cenomanian)	Burmese amber	Myanmar	A mite belonging to the family Smarididae. The type species is I. chewbaccei.	Immensmaris chewbaccei
Kachin serratus	Sp. nov	Valid	Wunderlich in Wunderlich & Müller	Late Cretaceous (Cenomanian)	Burmese amber	Myanmar	A spider belonging to the family Uloboridae.	
Leviunguis altus	Sp. nov	Valid	Wunderlich in Wunderlich & Müller	Late Cretaceous (Cenomanian)	Burmese amber	Myanmar	A spider belonging to the group Araneoidea and to the new family Leviunguidae.	
Leviunguis anulus	Sp. nov	Valid	Wunderlich in Wunderlich & Müller	Late Cretaceous (Cenomanian)	Burmese amber	Myanmar	A spider belonging to the group Araneoidea and to the new family Leviunguidae.	
Leviunguis anulusoides	Sp. nov	Valid	Wunderlich in Wunderlich & Müller	Late Cretaceous (Cenomanian)	Burmese amber	Myanmar	A spider belonging to the group Araneoidea and to the new family Leviunguidae.	
Leviunguis bruckschoides	Sp. nov	Valid	Wunderlich in Wunderlich & Müller	Late Cretaceous (Cenomanian)	Burmese amber	Myanmar	A spider belonging to the group Araneoidea and to the new family Leviunguidae.	
Leviunguis erectus	Sp. nov	Valid	Wunderlich in Wunderlich & Müller	Late Cretaceous (Cenomanian)	Burmese amber	Myanmar	A spider belonging to the group Araneoidea and to the new family Leviunguidae.	
Leviunguis glomulus	Sp. nov	Valid	Wunderlich in Wunderlich & Müller	Late Cretaceous (Cenomanian)	Burmese amber	Myanmar	A spider belonging to the group Araneoidea and to the new family Leviunguidae.	
Leviunguis glomus	Sp. nov	Valid	Wunderlich in Wunderlich & Müller	Late Cretaceous (Cenomanian)	Burmese amber	Myanmar	A spider belonging to the group Araneoidea and to the new family Leviunguidae.	
Leviunguis graciliembolus	Sp. nov	Valid	Wunderlich in Wunderlich & Müller	Late Cretaceous (Cenomanian)	Burmese amber	Myanmar	A spider belonging to the group Araneoidea and to the new family Leviunguidae.	
Leviunguis gradus	Sp. nov	Valid	Wunderlich in Wunderlich & Müller	Late Cretaceous (Cenomanian)	Burmese amber	Myanmar	A spider belonging to the group Araneoidea and to the new family Leviunguidae.	
Leviunguis porrigens	Sp. nov	Valid	Wunderlich in Wunderlich & Müller	Late Cretaceous (Cenomanian)	Burmese amber	Myanmar	A spider belonging to the group Araneoidea and to the new family Leviunguidae.	
Leviunguis pseudobruckschi	Sp. nov	Valid	Wunderlich in Wunderlich & Müller	Late Cretaceous (Cenomanian)	Burmese amber	Myanmar	A spider belonging to the group Araneoidea and to the new family Leviunguidae.	
Leviunguis quadratus	Sp. nov	Valid	Wunderlich in Wunderlich & Müller	Late Cretaceous (Cenomanian)	Burmese amber	Myanmar	A spider belonging to the group Araneoidea and to the new family Leviunguidae.	
Microproxiaraneus	Gen. et sp. nov	Valid	Wunderlich in Wunderlich & Müller	Late Cretaceous (Cenomanian)	Burmese amber	Myanmar	A spider belonging to the group Araneoidea and to the family Zarqaraneidae. The type species is M. annulatus.	
Miomastigoproctus	Gen. et sp. nov	Valid	Lourenço	Miocene	Mexican amber	Mexico	A member of Uropygi belonging to the family Thelyphonidae. Genus includes new species M. knodeli.	
Nothrotrombidium myanmarum	Sp. nov	Valid	Konikiewicz & Mąkol	Late Cretaceous (Cenomanian)	Burmese amber	Myanmar	A mite belonging to the family Trombellidae.	
Orchestina sakhalinensis	Sp. nov	Valid	Marusik, Perkovsky & Eskov	Middle Eocene	Sakhalinian amber	Russia	A species of Orchestina.	
Palaeoburmesebuthus knodeli	Sp. nov	Valid	Lourenço	Late Cretaceous (Cenomanian)	Burmese amber	Myanmar	A scorpion belonging to the family Palaeoburmesebuthidae.	
Palaeoleptoneta nils	Sp. nov	Valid	Wunderlich in Wunderlich & Müller	Late Cretaceous (Cenomanian)	Burmese amber	Myanmar	A spider, originally assigned to the family Leptonetidae, subsequently considered to be a member of Araneomorphae of uncertain affinities by Magalhaes et al..	
Palaeoleptoneta thilo	Sp. nov	Valid	Wunderlich in Wunderlich & Müller	Late Cretaceous (Cenomanian)	Burmese amber	Myanmar	A spider, originally assigned to the family Leptonetidae, subsequently considered to be a member of Araneomorphae of uncertain affinities by Magalhaes et al..	
Paramiagrammopes pusillus	Sp. nov	Valid	Wunderlich in Wunderlich & Müller	Late Cretaceous (Cenomanian)	Burmese amber	Myanmar	A spider belonging to the family Uloboridae.	
Parvibulbus	Gen. et sp. nov	Valid	Wunderlich in Wunderlich & Müller	Late Cretaceous (Cenomanian)	Burmese amber	Myanmar	A spider belonging to the family Pholcochyroceridae. The type species is P. incompletus.	
Paurospina	Gen. et 3 sp. nov	Valid	Wunderlich in Wunderlich & Müller	Late Cretaceous (Cenomanian)	Burmese amber	Myanmar	A spider belonging to the group Araneoidea and to the family Zarqaraneidae. The type species is P. curvata; genus also includes P. fortis and P. paulocurvata.	
Pholcochyrocer calidum	Sp. nov	Valid	Wunderlich in Wunderlich & Müller	Late Cretaceous (Cenomanian)	Burmese amber	Myanmar	A spider belonging to the family Pholcochyroceridae.	
Pholcochyrocer vermiculus	Sp. nov	Valid	Wunderlich in Wunderlich & Müller	Late Cretaceous (Cenomanian)	Burmese amber	Myanmar	A spider belonging to the family Pholcochyroceridae.	
Planibulbus	Gen. et sp. nov	Valid	Wunderlich in Wunderlich & Müller	Late Cretaceous (Cenomanian)	Burmese amber	Myanmar	A spider belonging to the family Uloboridae. The type species is P. longisoma.	
Praeteraraneoides	Gen. et 3 sp. nov		Wunderlich in Wunderlich & Müller	Late Cretaceous (Cenomanian)	Burmese amber	Myanmar	A spider belonging to the group Leptonetoidea and the new family Protoaraneoididae. The type species is P. bifurcatum; genus also includes P. bipartitum and P. leni. The spelling Praeteraneoides is also used in the publication naming the new genus.	
Proaraneoides	Gen. et sp. nov	Valid	Wunderlich in Wunderlich & Müller	Late Cretaceous (Cenomanian)	Burmese amber	Myanmar	A spider belonging to the group Leptonetoidea and the new family Protoaraneoididae. The type species is P. cribellatum.	
Propolyssenia	Gen. et sp. nov	Valid	Mąkol, Konikiewicz & Klug	Eocene	Baltic amber	Europe (Baltic Sea region)	A mite belonging to the group Prostigmata and to the family Tanaupodidae. Genus includes new species P. wohltmanni.	
Protoaraneoides	Gen. et sp. nov	Valid	Wunderlich in Wunderlich & Müller	Late Cretaceous (Cenomanian)	Burmese amber	Myanmar	A spider belonging to the group Leptonetoidea and the new family Protoaraneoididae. The type species is P. longispina.	
Protohylomysobia	Gen. et sp. nov	Valid	Sidorchuk & Bochkov in Sidorchuk et al.	Eocene	Baltic amber	Russia	A mite belonging to the family Myobiidae. Genus includes new species P. erinaceophilus.	
Proxiaraneus	Gen. et sp. nov	Valid	Wunderlich in Wunderlich & Müller	Late Cretaceous (Cenomanian)	Burmese amber	Myanmar	A spider belonging to the group Araneoidea and to the family Zarqaraneidae. The type species is P. rarus.	
Ramozarqaraneus	Gen. et sp. nov	Valid	Wunderlich in Wunderlich & Müller	Late Cretaceous (Cenomanian)	Burmese amber	Myanmar	A spider belonging to the group Araneoidea and to the family Zarqaraneidae. The type species is R. pauxillus.	
Spinicymbium	Gen. et sp. et comb. nov	Valid	Wunderlich in Wunderlich & Müller	Late Cretaceous (Cenomanian)	Burmese amber	Myanmar	A spider belonging to the group Araneoidea and to the family Zarqaraneidae. The type species is S. curvimetatarsus; genus also includes "Hypotheridiosoma" falcata Wunderlich (2015).	
Spinipalpitibia hirsuta	Sp. nov	Valid	Wunderlich in Wunderlich & Müller	Late Cretaceous (Cenomanian)	Burmese amber	Myanmar	A spider belonging to the group Leptonetoidea and the new family Protoaraneoididae.	
Tuckerella weiterschani	Sp. nov	Valid	Sidorchuk & Khaustov	Eocene	Baltic amber	Europe (Baltic Sea coast)	A peacock mite.	
Weygoldtiella	Gen. et sp. nov	Valid	Harvey et al.	Late Cretaceous (Cenomanian)	Burmese amber	Myanmar	A pseudoscorpion belonging to the family Chthoniidae. Genus includes new species W. plausus.	
Weygoldtina	Gen. et comb. nov	Valid	Dunlop	Late Carboniferous	British Middle Coal Measures; Mazon Creek fossil beds	United Kingdom; United States	A whip spider belonging to the group Paleoamblypygi and the new family Weygoldtinidae. The type species is "Graeophonus" scudderi Pocock (1911); genus also includes "Graeophonus" anglicus Pocock (1911).	W. anglica

== Crustaceans ==
=== Research ===
- Redescription of the Ordovician malacostracan Wuningia multisegmenlata is published by Lin (2018).
- A member of the erymid genus Enoploclytia is described from the Oxfordian deposits of Cricquebœuf (Normandy, France) by Devillez, Charbonnier & Pezy (2018), representing the first Jurassic occurrence of the genus reported so far.
- Redescription of Palaeopalaemon newberryi and a study on the phylogenetic relationships and life habits of this species is published by Jones et al. (2018).
- Description of the morphology of Tetrachela raiblana and a study on its implication for understanding of the homologies of carapace grooves between polychelidans and other decapods is published by Audo, Hyžný & Charbonnier (2018).
- A large-sized (12.9 mm maximum length) right valve of a marine ostracod is described from the Cretaceous amber from Myanmar by Xing et al. (2018).
- A study evaluating how sexual selection related to species extinction in fossil cytheroid ostracods is published by Fernandes Martins et al. (2018), who report that species with more pronounced sexual dimorphism had higher estimated extinction rates.
- An ostracod fauna including four species belonging to the suborder Darwinulocopina is described from the Lower Jurassic (Hettangian) Whitmore Point Member of the Moenave Formation (Arizona and Utah, United States) by Antonietto et al. (2018), potentially representing the last episode of darwinulocopine dominance in nonmarine environments before the Late Jurassic diversification of the cypridocopine and cytherocopine modern ostracods.
- Oxygen-isotope analysis of a whale barnacle specimen collected from early Pleistocene deposits of Apulia (Italy) is published by Collareta et al. (2018), who interpret their findings as indicating that the barnacle lived on a cetacean that seasonally migrated towards high-latitude areas outside the Mediterranean.

=== New taxa ===
==== Malacostracans ====
Name	Novelty	Status	Authors	Age	Unit	Location	Notes	Images
Abyssophthalmus adinae	Sp. nov	Valid	Schweitzer et al.	Late Jurassic		Romania	A crab belonging to the family Longodromitidae.	
Aethra stalennyii	Sp. nov	Valid	Ossó	Miocene (Serravallian to Messinian)		Spain; Ukraine	A species of Aethra.	
Amazighopsis	Gen. et sp. nov	Valid	Garassino & Pasini	Late Cretaceous (Cenomanian-Turonian)	Kem Kem Beds	Morocco	A member of Astacidea of uncertain phylogenetic placement, assigned to the new family Amazighopsidae. The type species is A. cretacica.	
Anapagurus muelleri	Sp. nov	Valid	Beschin, Busulini & Tessier in Beschin et al.	Eocene (Priabonian)		Italy	A hermit crab belonging to the family Paguridae.	
Archeostenoniscus	Gen. et 2 sp. nov	Valid	Broly in Broly, Serrano-Sánchez & Vega	Early Miocene	La Quinta Formation (Mexican amber)	Mexico	A woodlouse belonging to the family Stenoniscidae. The type species is A. robustus; genus also includes A. mexicanus.	
Armadilloniscus miocaenicus	Sp. nov	Valid	Broly in Broly, Serrano-Sánchez & Vega	Early Miocene	La Quinta Formation (Mexican amber)	Mexico	A woodlouse, a species of Armadilloniscus.	
Asthenognathus sakumotoi	Sp. nov	Valid	Karasawa	Miocene	Korematsu Formation; Lower Sandstone Member of the Bihoku Group	Japan	A crab belonging to the family Varunidae.	
Axianassa petrea	Sp. nov	Valid	Beschin, Busulini & Tessier in Beschin et al.	Eocene (Priabonian)		Italy	A member of the family Axianassidae.	
Balsscallichirus sangermani	Sp. nov	Valid	Beschin, Busulini & Tessier in Beschin et al.	Eocene (Priabonian)		Italy	A member of the family Callianassidae.	
Bericocarcinus	Gen. et sp. nov	Valid	De Angeli	Eocene (Priabonian)		Italy	A crab belonging to the family Macropipidae. The type species is B. alontensis.	
Blaculla felthausetsauteri	Sp. nov	Valid	Winkler	Late Jurassic (Tithonian)	Solnhofen Limestone	Germany	A caridean shrimp.	
Bryocarpilius stratensis	Sp. nov	Valid	Beschin, Busulini & Tessier in Beschin et al.	Eocene (Priabonian)		Italy	A crab belonging to the family Carpiliidae.	
Cabrillia	Gen. et sp. nov	Valid	Nyborg, Pasini & Garassino	Pliocene-Pleistocene	San Diego Formation	United States	A crab belonging to the family Leucosiidae. Genus includes new species C. hendyi.	
Calliaxina elegans	Sp. nov	Valid	Beschin, Busulini & Tessier in Beschin et al.	Eocene (Priabonian)		Italy	A member of the family Callianassidae.	
Callichirus ornatus	Sp. nov	Valid	Beschin, Busulini & Tessier in Beschin et al.	Eocene (Priabonian)		Italy	A species of Callichirus.	
Carinocalappa	Gen. et sp. nov	Valid	Beschin, Busulini & Tessier in Beschin et al.	Eocene (Priabonian)		Italy	A crab, a member of the family Calappidae. The type species is C. lineamenta.	
Cenomanocarcinus lenzenwegeri	Sp. nov	Valid	Hyžný et al.	Late Cretaceous (Santonian)		Austria	A crab belonging to the group Palaeocorystoidea.	
Ceratiocaris harpago	Sp. nov	Valid	Poschmann, Bergmann & Kühl	Early Devonian	Hunsrück Slate	Germany		
Cirolana centinelensis	Sp. nov	Valid	Maguire in Maguire et al.	Miocene (Burdigalian)	Estancia 25 de Mayo Formation	Argentina	An isopod, a species of Cirolana.	
Cirolana titanophila	Sp. nov	Valid	Robin et al.	Eocene (Ypresian)	Monte Bolca	Italy	An isopod, a species of Cirolana found in association with electric rays belonging to the genus Titanonarke.	
Daciapagurus	Gen. et sp. nov	Valid	Frantescu et al.	Late Jurassic		Romania	A hermit crab belonging to the family Schobertellidae. Genus includes new species D. minusculus.	
Daira iugata	Sp. nov	Valid	Beschin, Busulini & Tessier in Beschin et al.	Late Eocene		Italy	A crab belonging to the family Dairidae.	
Daira pseudovulgaris	Sp. nov	Valid	Beschin, Busulini & Tessier in Beschin et al.	Eocene (Priabonian)		Italy	A crab belonging to the family Dairidae.	
Daranyia tricristata	Sp. nov	Valid	Beschin, Busulini & Tessier in Beschin et al.	Eocene (Priabonian)		Italy	A crab, a member of Grapsoidea of uncertain phylogenetic placement.	
Dinochelus radwanskii	Sp. nov	Valid	Fraaije et al.	Late Cretaceous (Maastrichtian)		Poland	A species of Dinochelus.	
Diogenes denticulatus	Sp. nov	Valid	Beschin, Busulini & Tessier in Beschin et al.	Eocene (Priabonian)		Italy	A hermit crab belonging to the family Diogenidae, a species of Diogenes.	
Discapseudes (Miodiscapseudes)	Subgen. et sp. nov	Valid	Heard in Heard, de Lourdes Serrano-Sánchez & Vega	Early Miocene	Mexican amber	Mexico	A member of Tanaidacea belonging to the group Apseudomorpha. The subgenus includes new species D. chiapasensis.	
Eocarpilius ortegai	Sp. nov	Valid	Artal & van Bakel	Eocene (Ypresian)		Spain	A crab belonging to the family Carpiliidae.	
Eopetrolisthes levistriatus	Sp. nov	Valid	Beschin, Busulini & Tessier in Beschin et al.	Eocene (Priabonian)		Italy	A porcelain crab.	
Eucalliax multisetae	Sp. nov	Valid	Beschin, Busulini & Tessier in Beschin et al.	Eocene (Priabonian)		Italy	A member of the family Callianassidae.	
Eucalliax rugata	Sp. nov	Valid	Beschin, Busulini & Tessier in Beschin et al.	Eocene (Priabonian)		Italy	A member of the family Callianassidae.	
Exucarcinus	Gen. et sp. nov	Valid	Prado & Luque in Prado et al.	Early Cretaceous (late Aptian–early Albian)	Romualdo Formation	Brazil	A crab belonging to the group Raninoida and the family Orithopsidae. The type species is E. gonzagai.	
Galathea hexacristata	Sp. nov	Valid	Beschin, Busulini & Tessier in Beschin et al.	Eocene (Priabonian)		Italy	A species of Galathea.	
Gemmellarocarcinus disalvoi	Sp. nov	Valid	Beschin, Busulini & Tessier in Beschin et al.	Eocene (Priabonian)		Italy	A crab, a member of Dromiacea of uncertain phylogenetic placement.	
Glyphithyreus almerai	Sp. nov	Valid	Artal & van Bakel	Eocene (Ypresian)				
Guinotosia ornata	Sp. nov	Valid	Beschin, Busulini & Tessier in Beschin et al.	Eocene (Priabonian)		Italy	A crab, a member of the family Etyiidae.	
Homarus hungaricus	Sp. nov	Valid	Tshudy et al.	Oligocene (Chattian)	Mány Formation	Hungary	A species of Homarus.	
Hoploparia nasilowensis	Sp. nov	Valid	Fraaije et al.	Paleocene (Danian)		Poland		
Hyastenus antiquus	Sp. nov	Valid	Beschin, Busulini & Tessier in Beschin et al.	Eocene (Priabonian)		Italy	A crab belonging to the family Epialtidae, a species of Hyastenus.	
Hypothalassia campolongensis	Sp. nov	Valid	Beschin, Busulini & Tessier in Beschin et al.	Eocene (Priabonian)		Italy	A crab, a species of Hypothalassia.	
Icriobranchiocarcinus	Gen. et sp. nov	Valid	Vega in Vega et al.	Late Cretaceous (Maastrichtian)		Mexico	A member crab related to Icriocarcinus. Genus includes new species I. tzutzu.	
Ilerdapatiscus	Gen. et sp. nov	Valid	Artal & van Bakel	Eocene (Ypresian)		Spain	A crab belonging to the family Aethridae. Genus includes new species I. guardiae.	
Inachus eocenicus	Sp. nov	Valid	Beschin, Busulini & Tessier in Beschin et al.	Eocene (Priabonian)		Italy	A crab belonging to the family Inachidae, a species of Inachus.	
Kromtitis tergospinosus	Sp. nov	Valid	Beschin, Busulini & Tessier in Beschin et al.	Eocene (Priabonian)		Italy	A crab belonging to the family Dynomenidae.	
Laevitealliocaris	Gen. et sp. nov	Valid	Yang et al.	Late Carboniferous	Tupo Formation	China	A relative of Tealliocaris. The type species is L. xiaheyanensis.	
Lessiniamathia	Gen. et sp. nov	Valid	Ceccon & De Angeli	Eocene (Ypresian)		Italy	A crab belonging to the family Epialtidae. Genus includes new species L. bolcense.	
Lessinipagurus bericus	Sp. nov	Valid	Beschin, Busulini & Tessier in Beschin et al.	Eocene (Priabonian)		Italy	A hermit crab belonging to the family Xylopaguridae.	
Longipaguristes regularis	Sp. nov	Valid	Beschin, Busulini & Tessier in Beschin et al.	Eocene (Priabonian)		Italy	A hermit crab belonging to the family Diogenidae.	
Longodromites aubreyae	Sp. nov	Valid	Schweitzer et al.	Late Jurassic		Romania	A crab belonging to the family Longodromitidae.	
Maeandricampus starri	Sp. nov	Valid	Feldmann, Schweitzer & Goedert	Late Oligocene to earliest Miocene	Lincoln Creek Formation	United States	A crab belonging to the family Carcinidae.	
Mesolambrus bragai	Sp. nov	Valid	Beschin, Busulini & Tessier in Beschin et al.	Eocene (Priabonian)		Italy	A crab belonging to the family Parthenopidae.	
Occultocaris feckei	Sp. nov	Valid	Winkler	Late Jurassic (Tithonian)	Solnhofen Limestone	Germany	A caridean shrimp.	
Olicarcinus	Gen. et sp. nov	Valid	Beschin & Checchi	Eocene (Lutetian)		Italy	A crab belonging to the family Carcinidae. The type species is O. trevisani.	
Oscacarpilius	Gen. et sp. nov	Valid	Artal & van Bakel	Eocene (Ypresian)		Spain	A crab belonging to the family Carpiliidae. Genus includes new species O. rotundus.	
Pachycheles cristatus	Sp. nov	Valid	Beschin, Busulini & Tessier in Beschin et al.	Eocene (Priabonian)		Italy	A porcelain crab, a species of Pachycheles.	
Pachycheles multituberculatus	Sp. nov	Valid	Beschin, Busulini & Tessier in Beschin et al.	Eocene (Priabonian)		Italy	A porcelain crab, a species of Pachycheles.	
Pachycheles semiornatus	Sp. nov	Valid	Beschin, Busulini & Tessier in Beschin et al.	Eocene (Priabonian)		Italy	A porcelain crab, a species of Pachycheles.	
Paguristes michikoae	Sp. nov	Valid	Karasawa & Fudouji	Early Oligocene	Sari Sandstone Member of the Kishima Group	Japan	A species of Paguristes.	
Paguristes teruakii	Sp. nov	Valid	Karasawa & Fudouji	Early Oligocene	Sari Sandstone Member of the Kishima Group	Japan	A species of Paguristes.	
Paguristes vallionensis	Sp. nov	Valid	Beschin, Busulini & Tessier in Beschin et al.	Eocene (Priabonian)		Italy	A species of Paguristes.	
Palaemon monsdamarum	Sp. nov	Valid	Pasini & Garassino	Miocene (Messinian)		Italy	A species of Palaemon.	
Palaeoarmadillo	Gen. et sp. nov	Valid	Poinar	Late Cretaceous (Cenomanian)	Burmese amber	Myanmar	An isopod belonging to the family Armadillidae. Genus includes new species P. microsoma.	
Palaeolibrinus	Gen. et sp. nov	Valid	Broly in Broly, Serrano-Sánchez & Vega	Early Miocene	La Quinta Formation (Mexican amber)	Mexico	A woodlouse belonging to the family Olibrinidae. The type species is P. spinicornis.	
Palaeospherarmadillo	Gen. et 2 sp. nov	Valid	Broly in Broly, Serrano-Sánchez & Vega	Early Miocene	Mazantic Shale (Mexican amber)	Mexico	A woodlouse. The type species is P. mazanticus; genus also includes P. rotundus.	
Palicoides faggioni	Sp. nov	Valid	Beschin, Busulini & Tessier in Beschin et al.	Eocene (Priabonian)		Italy	A crab belonging to the family Palicidae.	
Panopeus paucicarinatus	Sp. nov	Valid	Beschin, Busulini & Tessier in Beschin et al.	Eocene (Priabonian)		Italy	A crab belonging to the family Panopeidae, a species of Panopeus.	
Paraclythia cernavoda	Sp. nov	Valid	Frantescu et al.	Early Cretaceous (Aptian)	Ramadan Formation	Romania	A lobster.	
Petrolisthes tuberculatus	Sp. nov	Valid	Beschin, Busulini & Tessier in Beschin et al.	Eocene (Priabonian)		Italy	A porcelain crab, a species of Petrolisthes.	
Pilidromia	Gen. et comb. nov	Valid	Schweitzer et al.	Late Jurassic		Germany; Romania	A crab belonging to the family Longodromitidae. The type species is "Planoprosopon" thiedeae Schweigert & Koppka (2011).	
Pithonoton lluismariaorum	Sp. nov	Valid	Ossó et al.	Early Cretaceous (Aptian)	Margas de Forcall Formation	Spain	A crab.	
Politohepatiscus	Gen. et sp. nov	Valid	Beschin, Busulini & Tessier in Beschin et al.	Eocene (Priabonian)		Italy	A crab, a member of the family Aethridae. The type species is P. zorzini.	
Porcellana elegans	Sp. nov	Valid	Beschin, Busulini & Tessier in Beschin et al.	Eocene (Priabonian)		Italy	A porcelain crab, a species of Porcellana.	
Prebranchioplax	Gen. et sp. nov	Valid	Vega et al.	Late Cretaceous (Campanian)	Cerro del Pueblo Formation; Parras Shale	Mexico	A crab belonging to the family Mathildellidae. Genus includes new species P. cretacica.	
Priorhyncha	Gen. et sp. nov	Valid	Alencar et al.	Early Cretaceous (Aptian-Albian)		Brazil	A member of Dendrobranchiata belonging to the family Solenoceridae. Genus includes new species P. feitosai.	
Proeryon charbonnieri	Sp. nov	Valid	Audo & Schweigert	Middle Jurassic (Callovian)	La Voulte-sur-Rhône Lagerstätte	France	A member of the family Coleiidae.	
Prosopon barbulescuae	Sp. nov	Disputed	Schweitzer et al.	Late Jurassic		Romania	A crab belonging to the family Prosopidae. Klompmaker et al. (2020) considered it to be a junior synonym of Europrosopon aculeatum (von Meyer, 1857).	
Pseudodromilites arzignanensis	Sp. nov	Valid	De Angeli & Alberti	Eocene (Lutetian)		Italy	A crab belonging to the family Dromiidae.	
Pseudopancolus	Gen. et sp. nov	Valid	Heard in Heard, de Lourdes Serrano-Sánchez & Vega	Early Miocene	Mexican amber	Mexico	A member of Tanaidacea belonging to the group Tanaidomorpha. Genus includes new species P. minutus.	
Rathbunopon tarraconensis	Sp. nov	Valid	Ossó et al.	Early Cretaceous (Aptian)	Margas de Forcall Formation	Spain	A crab.	
Romaleon franciscae	Sp. nov	Valid	Robin et al.	Miocene		French Southern and Antarctic Lands (Kerguelen Islands)	A species of Romaleon.	
Romaniacheiros	Gen. et sp. nov	Valid	Frantescu et al.	Late Jurassic (Kimmeridgian-Tithonian)		Romania	A member of Glypheoidea belonging to the family Mecochiridae. Genus includes new species R. lophia.	
Romualdocarcinus	Gen. et sp. nov	Valid	Prado & Luque in Prado et al.	Early Cretaceous (late Aptian–early Albian)	Romualdo Formation	Brazil	A crab belonging to the group Heterotremata, possibly a member of the family Eogeryonidae. The type species is R. salesi.	
Sakakurapsus	Gen. et sp. nov	Valid	Karasawa	Miocene	Lower Sandstone Member of the Bihoku Group	Japan	A crab belonging to the family Varunidae. The type species is S. kogisorum.	
Schramocaris clarksoni	Sp. nov	Valid	Clark, Miller & Ross	Carboniferous (Viséan)		United Kingdom	A eumalacostracan crustacean similar to Tealliocaris and Pseudogalathea.	
Schramocaris matthewi	Sp. nov	Valid	Clark, Miller & Ross	Carboniferous (Viséan)		Canada	A eumalacostracan crustacean similar to Tealliocaris and Pseudogalathea.	
Sume	Gen. et sp. nov	Valid	Saraiva, Pinheiro & Santana	Early Cretaceous (Aptian/Albian)	Romualdo Member	Brazil	A member of the family Luciferidae. Genus includes new species S. marcosi.	
Tanidromites starzykae	Sp. nov	Valid	Schweitzer et al.	Late Jurassic		Romania	A crab belonging to the family Tanidromitidae.	
Tethyranina	Gen. et comb. nov	Valid	Pasini & Garassino	Early Miocene – early Pleistocene		Italy	A crab belonging to the family Raninidae. The type species is "Ranina" propinqua Ristori (1891).	
Vegaranina rivasi	Sp. nov	Valid	Arano-Ruiz et al.	Late Cretaceous		Cuba	A member of the family Raninidae.	
Zannatoius	Gen. et sp. nov	Valid	Beschin, Busulini & Tessier in Beschin et al.	Eocene (Priabonian)		Italy	A crab, a member of the family Leucosiidae. The type species is Z. vicetinus.	

==== Ostracods ====
Name	Novelty	Status	Authors	Age	Unit	Location	Notes	Images
Acratia caeracella	Sp. nov	Valid	Forel & Grădinaru	Middle Triassic (Anisian)		Romania		
Acratia maugerii	Sp. nov	Valid	Crasquin, Sciuto & Reitano	Late Triassic (Carnian)	Mufara Formation	Italy		
Advenocypris similis	Sp. nov	Valid	Teterina	Pliocene	Beken Formation	Russia	A member of the family Candonidae.	
Aechmina akumame	Sp. nov	Valid	Stocker et al.	Carboniferous (Moscovian)	Ichinotani Formation	Japan	A member of Podocopa belonging to the order Beyrichiocopida and the family Aechminidae.	
Aechmina? meidlai	Sp. nov	Valid	Lajblová & Kraft	Ordovician (Katian)	Králův Dvůr Formation	Czech Republic	A member of the family Aechminidae.	
Alciella irizukii	Sp. nov	Valid	Yasuhara et al.	Eocene		Madagascar		
Alicenula longiformis	Sp. nov	Valid	Leite et al.	Early Cretaceous	Quiricó Formation	Brazil		
Alicenula sousaensis	Sp. nov	Valid	Sousa, Carvalho & Ferreira	Early Cretaceous	Sousa Formation	Brazil		
Amplocypris qaidamensis	Sp. nov	Valid	Yang et al.	Quaternary	Qaidam Basin	China	A member of the family Cyprididae.	
"Anchistrocheles" gemmellaroi	Sp. nov	Valid	Crasquin, Sciuto & Reitano	Late Triassic (Carnian)	Mufara Formation	Italy	A member of Podocopa belonging to the family Bairdiidae. Originally tentatively assigned to the genus Anchistrocheles, but subsequently transferred to the genus Histriabairdia by Forel & Grădinaru (2020).	
Aphelocythere dilgeri	Sp. nov	Valid	Franz, Ebert & Stulpinaite	Middle Jurassic (Aalenian and Bajocian)	Upper Opalinuston Formation	Germany	A member of the family Cytheruridae.	
Bairdia asgarda	Sp. nov	Valid	Ayress & Gould	Early Cretaceous	Åsgard Formation	North Sea; Norwegian Sea	A member of Podocopida belonging to the group Bairdiocopina and the family Bairdiidae.	
Bairdia liviae	Sp. nov	Valid	Forel & Grădinaru	Middle Triassic (Anisian)		Romania		
Bairdia mandruella	Sp. nov	Valid	Forel & Grădinaru	Middle Triassic (Anisian)		Romania		
Bairdia monostorii	Nom. nov	Valid	Forel & Grădinaru	Middle Triassic (Anisian)		Romania		
Bairdia scaliae	Sp. nov	Valid	Crasquin, Sciuto & Reitano	Late Triassic (Carnian)	Mufara Formation	Italy		
Bairdia tagaensis	Sp. nov	Valid	Tanaka in Tanaka et a.	Permian (Cisuralian)	Ryozensan Limestone Formation	Japan		
Bairdiacypris ikeyanoriyukii	Sp. nov	Valid	Tanaka in Tanaka et a.	Permian (Cisuralian)	Ryozensan Limestone Formation	Japan		
Bairdiacypris sorgunensis	Sp. nov	Valid	Forel in Forel, Ozsvárt & Moix	Late Triassic (Carnian)		Turkey	A member of the family Bairdiidae.	
Baltonotella? admirabilis	Sp. nov	Valid	Lajblová & Kraft	Ordovician (Katian)	Králův Dvůr Formation	Czech Republic	A member of the family Aparchitidae.	
Bektasia yawella	Sp. nov	Valid	Forel in Ketmuangmoon et al.	Middle Triassic (Anisian)	Pha Kan Formation	Thailand		
Bolbinella limbata	Sp. nov	Valid	Gonta & Kanygin	Late Ordovician	Mangazeya Formation	Russia	A member of Leperditellocopida belonging to the family Bolliidae.	
Bythoceratina spinosa	Sp. nov	Valid	Barros & Piovesan in Barros, Piovesan & Agostinho	Late Cretaceous (Maastrichtian)	Gramame Formation	Brazil	A member of Podocopida belonging to the family Bythocytheridae.	
Cardobairdia tesakovae	Sp. nov	Valid	Franz, Ebert & Stulpinaite	Middle Jurassic (Aalenian)		Germany	A member of the family Healdiidae.	
Clithrocytheridea ljubimovae	Sp. nov	Valid	Dykan in Dykan et al.	Paleogene	Boltysh crater	Ukraine	A member of the family Cytherideidae.	
Clivosolobella	Gen. et sp. nov	Valid	Gonta & Kanygin	Late Ordovician	Ust'-Stolbovaya Formation	Russia	A member of Hollinocopida belonging to the family Egorovellidae. The type species is C. rugula.	
Collibolbina habeotubercula	Sp. nov	Valid	Gonta & Kanygin	Late Ordovician	Mangazeya Formation	Russia	A member of Hollinocopida belonging to the family Tetradellidae.	
Crescentilla laciniata	Sp. nov	Valid	Lajblová & Kraft	Ordovician (Katian)	Králův Dvůr Formation	Czech Republic	A member of the family Aechminidae.	
Cypridea paraibensis	Sp. nov	Valid	Sousa, Carvalho & Ferreira	Early Cretaceous	Sousa Formation	Brazil		
Cypridea samesi	Sp. nov	Valid	Choi, Wang & Huh	Early Cretaceous	Jinju Formation	South Korea		
Cypridea vianai	Sp. nov	Valid	Sousa, Carvalho & Ferreira	Early Cretaceous	Sousa Formation	Brazil		
Cypridea zalanyii	Sp. nov	Valid	Cséfán & Tóth	Early Cretaceous (Albian)		Hungary		
Cyprideis civisi	Sp. nov		Ruiz, González-Regalado & Abad	Pliocene		Spain	A member of the family Cytherideidae.	
Cytherella boltyshevae	Sp. nov	Valid	Dykan in Dykan et al.	Paleogene	Boltysh crater	Ukraine	A member of the family Cytherellidae.	
Cytherella centrocompressa	Sp. nov	Valid	Barros & Piovesan in Barros, Piovesan & Agostinho	Late Cretaceous (late Maastrichtian)	Gramame Formation	Brazil	A member of the family Cytherellidae.	
Cytherella paraibensis	Sp. nov	Valid	Barros & Piovesan in Barros, Piovesan & Agostinho	Late Cretaceous (late Maastrichtian)	Gramame Formation	Brazil	A member of the family Cytherellidae.	
Cytherelloidea baghinensis	Sp. nov	Valid	Khosravi, Vaziri & Arab	Early Cretaceous (Aptian)		Iran		
Cytherelloidea mazarensis	Sp. nov	Valid	Khosravi, Vaziri & Arab	Early Cretaceous (Aptian)		Iran		
Cytherelloidea sirizensis	Sp. nov	Valid	Khosravi, Vaziri & Arab	Early Cretaceous (Aptian)		Iran		
Cytheropterina alacostata	Sp. nov	Valid	Franz, Ebert & Stulpinaite	Middle Jurassic (Aalenian)	Achdorf Formation	Germany	A member of the family Cytheruridae.	
Darwinula oryzalis	Nom. nov	Valid	Naumcheva	Early Triassic	Vokhma Formation	Russia	A replacement name for Darwinula acuta Mishina (1966).	
Darwinula vetusta	Nom. nov	Valid	Naumcheva	Permian		Russia	A replacement name for Darwinula mera Starozhilova (1967).	
Disulcina (?) complanata	Sp. nov	Valid	Gonta & Kanygin	Late Ordovician	Dolborsa Formation	Russia	A member of Hollinocopida belonging to the family Sylthiidae.	
Dorsogibbella	Gen. et 3 sp. nov	Valid	Gonta & Kanygin	Late Ordovician	Mangazeya Formation	Russia	A member of Hollinocopida belonging to the family Piretellidae. The type species is D. hippocrepicus; genus also includes new species D. claviformis and D. costaventralis.	
Easchmidtella gibbosa	Sp. nov	Valid	Gonta & Kanygin	Late Ordovician	Dolborsa Formation	Russia	A member of Leperditellocopida belonging to the family Schmidtellidae.	
Eucyprinotus qinghaiensis	Sp. nov	Valid	Yang et al.	Quaternary	Qaidam Basin	China	A member of the family Cyprididae.	
Eucypris lobatoi	Sp. nov	Valid	Bergue, Ramos & Maranhão	Oligocene	Tremembé Formation	Brazil	A member of the family Cyprididae.	
Eucytherura ventrotuberculata	Sp. nov	Valid	Barros & Piovesan in Barros, Piovesan & Agostinho	Late Cretaceous (Maastrichtian) and Paleocene (Danian)	Gramame Formation	Argentina; Brazil	A member of Podocopida belonging to the family Cytheruridae.	
Euprimites (Euprimites) kralodvorensis	Sp. nov	Valid	Lajblová & Kraft	Ordovician (Katian)	Králův Dvůr Formation	Czech Republic	A member of the family Tvaerenellidae.	
Gaindella	Gen. et sp. nov	Valid	Gonta & Kanygin	Late Ordovician	Dolborsa Formation	Russia	A member of Hollinocopida belonging to the family Egorovellidae. The type species is G. signata.	
Healdia mizuboradanensis	Sp. nov	Valid	Stocker et al.	Carboniferous (Moscovian)	Ichinotani Formation	Japan	A member of Podocopa belonging to the order Podocopida and the family Healdiidae.	
Hemicypris lomastroi	Sp. nov	Valid	Spadi, Gliozzi & Medici	Piacenzian–Gelasian	Dunarobba Fossil Forest	Italy		
Heterocypris subtriangularis	Sp. nov	Valid	Yang et al.	Quaternary	Qaidam Basin	China	A member of the family Cyprididae.	
Hungarella mahmudiaensis	Sp. nov	Valid	Forel & Grădinaru	Middle Triassic (Anisian)		Romania		
Hungarella poli	Sp. nov	Valid	Chitnarin in Ketmuangmoon et al.	Middle Triassic (Anisian)	Pha Kan Formation	Thailand		
Hungaroleberis	Gen. et sp. et comb. nov	Valid	Tóth & Cséfán	Late Permian to Middle Jurassic (Bajocian)		China; Greece; Hungary	A member of Myodocopa. The type species is H. retiferus; genus also includes "Cypridina" gussevaae Crasquin-Soleau & Baud (1998).	
?Infracytheropteron bisulcatum	Sp. nov	Valid	Franz, Ebert & Stulpinaite	Middle Jurassic (Aalenian)		Germany	A member of the family Cytheruridae.	
Judahella? montanarii	Sp. nov	Valid	Crasquin, Sciuto & Reitano	Late Triassic (Carnian)	Mufara Formation	Italy		
Kellettina noriyukii	Sp. nov	Valid	Tanaka in Tanaka et a.	Permian (Cisuralian)	Ryozensan Limestone Formation	Japan		
Kempfina tineriella	Sp. nov	Valid	Forel & Grădinaru	Middle Triassic (Anisian)		Romania		
Kinkelinella (Kinkelinella) geisingensis	Sp. nov	Valid	Franz, Ebert & Stulpinaite	Middle Jurassic (Aalenian)		Germany	A member of the family Progonocytheridae.	
Langiella fauthi	Sp. nov	Valid	Barros & Piovesan in Barros, Piovesan & Agostinho	Late Cretaceous (Maastrichtian)	Gramame Formation	Brazil	A member of Podocopida belonging to the family Trachyleberididae.	
Langtonia abdomorostrata	Sp. nov	Valid	Dykan in Dykan et al.	Paleogene	Boltysh crater	Ukraine		
Lenatella arcuata	Sp. nov	Valid	Gonta & Kanygin	Late Ordovician	Mangazeya Formation	Russia	A member of the family Piretellidae.	
Leviella lampangensis	Sp. nov	Valid	Forel in Ketmuangmoon et al.	Middle Triassic (Anisian)	Pha Kan Formation	Thailand		
Liuzhinia antalyaformis	Sp. nov	Valid	Forel & Grădinaru	Middle Triassic (Anisian)		Romania		
Liuzhinia bithynica	Sp. nov	Valid	Forel & Grădinaru	Middle Triassic (Anisian)		Romania		
Liuzhinia edvardgriegi	Sp. nov	Valid	Forel & Grădinaru	Middle Triassic (Anisian)		Romania		
Microcheilinella? contrariella	Sp. nov	Valid	Forel & Grădinaru	Middle Triassic (Anisian)		Romania		
Microcheilinella shigensis	Sp. nov	Valid	Tanaka in Tanaka et a.	Permian (Cisuralian)	Ryozensan Limestone Formation	Japan		
Milleratia tungusica	Sp. nov	Valid	Gonta & Kanygin	Ordovician		Russia	A member of Eridocopida belonging to the family Cryptophillidae.	
Muellerina eocenica	Sp. nov	Valid	Yasuhara et al.	Eocene		Madagascar		
Neocyprideis polygonoreticulata	Sp. nov	Valid	Yasuhara et al.	Eocene		Madagascar		
Neomonoceratina afroangulosa	Sp. nov	Valid	Yasuhara et al.	Eocene		Madagascar		
Neomonoceratina iwasakii	Sp. nov	Valid	Tanaka in Tanaka et al.	Eocene	Akasaki Formation	Japan	A member of Podocopida belonging to the family Schizocytheridae.	
Neonesidea potyensis	Sp. nov	Valid	Barros & Piovesan in Barros, Piovesan & Agostinho	Late Cretaceous (Maastrichtian)	Gramame Formation	Brazil	A member of Podocopida belonging to the family Bairdiidae.	
Neorichterina	Gen. et sp. nov	Valid	Tóth & Cséfán	Early Cretaceous (Albian)		Brazil; Gabon; Hungary; Israel; Morocco; Switzerland; United Kingdom; Pacific Ocean (Mid Pacific Mountains)	A member of Myodocopa belonging to the family Entomozoidae. The type species is N. striata.	
Neothlipsura khiska	Sp. nov	Valid	Salas et al.	Late Silurian	Tambolar Formation	Argentina		
Oliganisus ryozensannensis	Sp. nov	Valid	Tanaka in Tanaka et a.	Permian (Cisuralian)	Ryozensan Limestone Formation	Japan		
Paijenborchella amakusensis	Sp. nov	Valid	Tanaka et al.	Eocene	Akasaki Formation	Japan	A member of Podocopida belonging to the family Schizocytheridae.	
Paijenborchellina madagascarensis	Sp. nov	Valid	Yasuhara et al.	Eocene		Madagascar		
Palaeocypridina goeroegae	Sp. nov	Valid	Tóth & Cséfán	Middle Triassic (Ladinian)	Buchenstein Formation	Hungary	A member of Myodocopa.	
Paracypris oanaella	Sp. nov	Valid	Forel & Grădinaru	Middle Triassic (Anisian)		Romania		
Paralimnocythere turgida	Sp. nov	Valid	Spadi, Gliozzi & Medici	Piacenzian–Gelasian	Dunarobba Fossil Forest	Italy		
Parenthatia hanamiloslavensis	Sp. nov	Valid	Lajblová & Kraft	Ordovician (Katian)	Králův Dvůr Formation	Czech Republic	A member of the family Bolliidae.	
Penthesilenula pintoi	Sp. nov	Valid	Leite et al.	Early Cretaceous	Quiricó Formation	Brazil		
Pleurocythere ohmerti	Sp. nov	Valid	Franz, Ebert & Stulpinaite	Middle Jurassic (Aalenian and Bajocian)		Germany	A member of the family Protocytheridae.	
Pokornyopsis csurgokutensis	Sp. nov	Valid	Tóth & Cséfán	Early Jurassic (Toarcian)		Hungary	A member of Myodocopa.	
Polycope circulosa	Sp. nov	Valid	Franz, Ebert & Stulpinaite	Middle Jurassic (Aalenian)		Germany	A member of the family Polycopidae.	
Pontocyprella valhalla	Sp. nov	Valid	Ayress & Gould	Early Cretaceous	Tuxen Formation; Valhall Formation	North Sea; Norwegian Sea		
Potamocypris taubatensis	Sp. nov	Valid	Bergue, Ramos & Maranhão	Oligocene	Tremembé Formation	Brazil	A member of the family Cyprididae.	
Praeschuleridea concentrica	Sp. nov	Valid	Franz, Ebert & Stulpinaite	Middle Jurassic (Aalenian)		Germany	A member of the family Schulerideidae.	
Procytheropteron catena	Sp. nov	Valid	Franz, Ebert & Stulpinaite	Middle Jurassic (Aalenian)		Germany	A member of the family Cytheruridae.	
Progonocythere scutula	Sp. nov	Valid	Franz, Ebert & Stulpinaite	Middle Jurassic (Aalenian)		Germany	A member of the family Progonocytheridae.	
Protobuntonia punctatum	Sp. nov	Valid	Barros & Piovesan in Barros, Piovesan & Agostinho	Late Cretaceous (late Maastrichtian) and Paleocene (early Danian)	Gramame Formation	Brazil	A member of Podocopida belonging to the family Trachyleberididae.	
Pseudulrichia lucberkensis	Sp. nov	Valid	Lajblová & Kraft	Ordovician (Katian)	Králův Dvůr Formation	Czech Republic	A member of the family Aechminidae.	
Pseudulrichia risumata	Sp. nov	Valid	Lajblová & Kraft	Ordovician (Katian)	Králův Dvůr Formation	Czech Republic	A member of the family Aechminidae.	
Psychrodromus mangnaiensis	Sp. nov	Valid	Yang et al.	Quaternary	Qaidam Basin	China	A member of the family Cyprididae.	
Pustulobairdia ohmiensis	Sp. nov	Valid	Tanaka in Tanaka et a.	Permian (Cisuralian)	Ryozensan Limestone Formation	Japan		
Rectella bublei	Sp. nov	Valid	Lajblová & Kraft	Ordovician (Katian)	Králův Dvůr Formation	Czech Republic	A member of the family Rectellidae.	
Reigiopsis conicus	Sp. nov	Valid	Gonta & Kanygin	Late Ordovician	Mangazeya Formation	Russia	A member of Hollinocopida belonging to the family Tetradellidae.	
Reigiopsis tumulus	Sp. nov	Valid	Gonta & Kanygin	Late Ordovician	Mangazeya Formation	Russia	A member of Hollinocopida belonging to the family Tetradellidae.	
Scutumella gruminosa	Sp. nov	Valid	Gonta & Kanygin	Late Ordovician	Mangazeya Formation	Russia	A member of Leperditellocopida belonging to the family Bolliidae.	
Spinigerites ostrovites	Sp. nov	Valid	Lajblová & Kraft	Ordovician (Katian)	Králův Dvůr Formation	Czech Republic	A member of the family Spinigeritidae.	
Spiricopia	Gen. et sp. nov	Valid	Siveter et al.	Silurian	Coalbrookdale Formation	United Kingdom	A member of Myodocopida belonging to the family Cylindroleberididae. The type species is S. aurita.	
Stigmatobradleya	Gen. et sp. nov	Valid	Yasuhara et al.	Eocene		Madagascar	Genus includes new species S. hunti.	
Timiriasevia sanfranciscanensis	Sp. nov	Valid	Leite et al.	Early Cretaceous	Quiricó Formation	Brazil		
Trajancypris nanlingqiuensis	Sp. nov	Valid	Yang et al.	Quaternary	Qaidam Basin	China	A member of the family Cyprididae.	
Triassocypris phakanella	Sp. nov	Valid	Forel in Ketmuangmoon et al.	Middle Triassic (Anisian)	Pha Kan Formation	Thailand		
Tyrrhenocythere pulcherrima	Sp. nov	Valid	Sciuto et al.	Miocene (Messinian) to early Pleistocene)		Italy	A member of Podocopida belonging to the family Hemicytheridae.	
Uroleberis paranuda	Sp. nov	Valid	Yasuhara et al.	Eocene		Madagascar		
Wangshangkia	Gen. et 2 sp. nov	Valid	Song & Gong	Late Devonian	Gelaohe Formation	China	A member of Podocopida belonging to the superfamily Bairdiocypridoidea and the family Bairdiocyprididae. The type species is W. dushaniensis; genus also includes W. bailouiensis.	
Warthinia trinoda	Sp. nov	Valid	Lajblová & Kraft	Ordovician (Katian)	Králův Dvůr Formation	Czech Republic	A member of the family Bolliidae.	
Xestoleberis renemai	Sp. nov	Valid	Yasuhara et al.	Eocene		Madagascar		

==== Other crustaceans ====
Name	Novelty	Status	Authors	Age	Unit	Location	Notes	Images
Diestheria deshenglingensis	Sp. nov		Niu in Niu & Xin	Cretaceous		China	A clam shrimp.	
Diestheria latovata	Sp. nov		Niu in Niu & Xin	Cretaceous		China	A clam shrimp.	
Diestheria ovaliformis	Sp. nov		Niu in Niu & Xin	Cretaceous		China	A clam shrimp.	
Diestheria striaris	Sp. nov		Niu in Niu & Xin	Cretaceous		China	A clam shrimp.	
Diestheria xiaoqiaomugouensis	Sp. nov		Niu in Niu & Xin	Cretaceous		China	A clam shrimp.	
Diestheria yangshugouensis	Sp. nov		Niu in Niu & Xin	Cretaceous		China	A clam shrimp.	
Eosestheria gracilis	Sp. nov		Niu in Niu & Xin	Cretaceous		China	A clam shrimp.	
Eosestheria jiuwuensis	Sp. nov		Niu in Niu & Xin	Cretaceous		China	A clam shrimp.	
Eosestheria lata	Sp. nov		Niu in Niu & Xin	Cretaceous		China	A clam shrimp.	
Eosestheria magna	Sp. nov		Niu in Niu & Xin	Cretaceous		China	A clam shrimp.	
Eosestheria obliqua	Sp. nov		Niu in Niu & Xin	Cretaceous		China	A clam shrimp.	
Eosestheria paucilinearis	Sp. nov		Niu in Niu & Xin	Cretaceous		China	A clam shrimp.	
Eosestheria shanwanensis	Sp. nov		Niu in Niu & Xin	Cretaceous		China	A clam shrimp.	
Eosestheria shibapanensiss	Sp. nov		Niu in Niu & Xin	Cretaceous		China	A clam shrimp.	
Eosestheria yangshugouensiss	Sp. nov		Niu in Niu & Xin	Cretaceous		China	A clam shrimp.	
Euestheria kozuri	Sp. nov	Valid	Geyer & Kelber	Late Triassic (Carnian)	Hassberge Formation	Germany	A clam shrimp.	
Gregoriusella striatula	Sp. nov	Valid	Geyer & Kelber	Late Triassic (Carnian)	Hassberge Formation	Germany	A clam shrimp.	
Hemicycloleaia ejinaqiensis	Sp. nov		Niu in Lu et al.	Permian		China	A diplostracan belonging to the family Leaiidae.	
Hexaminius venerai	Sp. nov	Valid	Kočí et al.	Middle Eocene	La Meseta Formation	Antarctica (Seymour Island)	A barnacle.	
Platyestheria	Gen. et comb. nov	Valid	Bittencourt et al.	Early Cretaceous	Quiricó Formation	Brazil	A clam shrimp; a new genus for "Pseudestheria" abaetensis Cardoso (1971).	
Polygrapta neimengguensis	Sp. nov		Niu in Lu et al.	Permian		China	A clam shrimp belonging to the family Euestheriidae.	
Skuinocyclus	Gen. et sp. nov	Valid	Mychko & Alekseev	Permian (Cisuralian)		Russia	A member of Cyclida. Genus includes new species S. juliae.	
Undulatesta	Gen. et sp. nov	Valid	Gueriau, Rabet & Du Tien Hat	Devonian (late Famennian)		Belgium	A clam shrimp belonging to the group Vertexioidea. The type species is U. bounonensis.	
Uralocyclus	Gen. et comb. nov	Valid	Mychko & Alekseev	Permian (Asselian)		Russia	A member of Cyclida. Genus includes "Cyclus" miloradovitchi Kramarenko (1961).	
Yanjiestheria anchungouensis	Sp. nov		Niu in Niu & Xin	Cretaceous		China	A clam shrimp.	
Yanjiestheria deshenglingensis	Sp. nov		Niu in Niu & Xin	Cretaceous		China	A clam shrimp.	
Yanjiestheria rotunda	Sp. nov		Niu in Niu & Xin	Cretaceous		China	A clam shrimp.	
Yanjiestheria shanwanensis	Sp. nov		Niu in Niu & Xin	Cretaceous		China	A clam shrimp.	
Yanjiestheria xiaoqiaomugouensis	Sp. nov		Niu in Niu & Xin	Cretaceous		China	A clam shrimp.	

== Trilobites ==
=== Research ===
- Frontal auxiliary impressions (muscle scars on the glabella) are described in Mesolenellus hyperboreus from Cambrian Stage 4 strata of North Greenland by Lerosey-Aubril & Peel (2018), providing new information on the evolution of a pouch-like digestive organ with powerful extrinsic muscles (i.e. a crop) in trilobites.
- A study on complete moulted exoskeletons of Estaingia bilobata and Redlichia takooensis from the Cambrian Emu Bay Shale (Australia), and their implications for inferring the course of moulting in trilobites, is published by Drage et al. (2018).
- A study assessing the morphological differences within and among three populations of Oryctocephalus indicus from the United States, Siberia and China, using a new method of analysing small morphological features, is published by Esteve et al. (2018).
- A study on early post-embryonic developmental stages of the Cambrian trilobite Ellipsostrenua granulosa is published by Laibl, Cederström & Ahlberg (2018).
- A study on the ontogeny of the co-occurring shumardiid trilobites Akoldinioidia latus and Koldinioidia choii from the middle Furongian Hwajeol Formation (South Korea) is published by Park (2018).
- Remains of the digestive system of a specimen of the bathycheilid species Prionocheilus vokovicensis from the Ordovician Šárka Formation (Czech Republic) are described by Fatka & Budil (2018).
- A study on the postembryonic development of Dalmanitina, based on a large sample of specimens from the Upper Ordovician Prague Basin, is published by Drage, Laibl & Budil (2018).
- A large and almost complete dorsal exoskeleton of a trilobite referred to the species Dipleura dekayi is described from the Devonian Floresta Formation (Colombia) by Carvalho (2018).
- A study on the phylogenetic relationships of species belonging to the genus Metacryphaeus is published by Carbonaro et al. (2018), who also perform a palaeobiogeographic analysis for the distribution of the genus.

=== New taxa ===
Name	Novelty	Status	Authors	Age	Unit	Location	Notes	Images
Adelogonus prichardi	Sp. nov	Valid	Smith, Paterson & Brock	Cambrian	Goyder Formation	Australia		
Amphiroaspis	Gen. et comb. nov	Valid	Müller & Hahn	Carboniferous (Mississippian)		Germany	A member of the family Phillipsiidae belonging to the subfamily Weaniinae. The type species is "Carbonocoryphe (Winterbergia)" amphiro Hahn, Hahn & Müller (1996); genus also includes "Carbonocoryphe (Winterbergia)" sporada Hahn, Hahn & Müller (2007).	
Asaphellus albae	Sp. nov	Valid	Meroi Arcerito et al.	Ordovician (Tremadocian)	Santa Rosita Formation	Argentina		
Austerops salamandaroides	Sp. nov	Valid	Crônier et al.	Devonian	Chefar el Ahmar Formation	Algeria		
Bailiella sepulcra	Sp. nov	Valid	Álvaro & Vizcaïno	Cambrian (Furongian)	Bailiella Formation	Morocco	A member of the family Conocoryphidae.	
Belgibole kalypso	Sp. nov	Valid	Müller & Hahn	Carboniferous (Mississippian)		Germany		
Bradocryphaeus echinatus	Sp. nov	Valid	Van Viersen & Vanherle	Devonian (Frasnian)	Moulin Liénaux Formation	Belgium	A member of the family Acastidae.	
Bradocryphaeus laomedeia	Sp. nov	Valid	Van Viersen & Vanherle	Devonian (Frasnian)	Grands Breux Formation	Belgium	A member of the family Acastidae.	
Bradocryphaeus neptuni hottonensis	Subsp. nov	Valid	Van Viersen & Vanherle	Devonian (Frasnian)	Grands Breux Formation	Belgium	A member of the family Acastidae.	
Brevibole archinalae	Sp. nov	Valid	Müller & Hahn	Carboniferous (Mississippian)		Germany		
Brevibole halszkae	Sp. nov	Valid	Müller & Hahn	Carboniferous (Mississippian)		Germany		
Buchiproetus? exconcha	Sp. nov	Valid	Flick	Devonian		Germany	A member of Proetida belonging to the family Tropidocoryphidae.	
Buenellus chilhoweensis	Sp. nov	Valid	Webster & Hageman	Cambrian Series 2 (Montezuman)	Murray Shale	United States		
Chlupacula (Chiides) pandora	Sp. nov	Valid	Müller & Hahn	Carboniferous (Mississippian)		Germany		
Cornuproetus pusulosus	Sp. nov	Valid	Feist & Belka	Devonian (Emsian)		Morocco		
Cornuproetus? runzheimeri	Sp. nov	Valid	Flick	Devonian		Germany	A member of Proetida belonging to the family Tropidocoryphidae.	
Crassibole ate	Sp. nov	Valid	Müller & Hahn	Carboniferous (Mississippian)		Germany		
Crassibole? walliseri	Sp. nov	Valid	Müller & Hahn	Carboniferous (Mississippian)		Germany		
Cyphaspis koimeterionensis	Sp. nov	Valid	Van Viersen & Vanherle	Devonian (Frasnian)	Grands Breux Formation	Belgium	A member of the family Aulacopleuridae.	
Cyrtoproetus eremus	Sp. nov	Valid	Müller & Hahn	Carboniferous (Mississippian)		Germany		
Cyrtoproetus galapagos	Sp. nov	Valid	Müller & Hahn	Carboniferous (Mississippian)		Germany		
Cyrtoproetus pegasus	Sp. nov	Valid	Müller & Hahn	Carboniferous (Mississippian)		Germany		
Deltapliomera	Gen. et 3 sp. et comb. nov	Valid	McAdams, Adrain & Karim	Early Ordovician		United States	The type species is D. humphriesi; genus also includes new species D. eppersoni and D. inglei, as well as D. heimbergi.	
Diacoryphe (Diacoryphe) phoenix	Sp. nov	Valid	Müller & Hahn	Carboniferous (Mississippian)		Germany		
Ditomopyge (Carniphillipsia) mosquensis	Sp. nov	Valid	Mychko & Alekseev	Carboniferous (Gzhelian)		Russia		
Duyunaspis jianheensis	Sp. nov	Valid	Chen et al.	Cambrian Stage 4		China	An oryctocephalid trilobite.	
Dysplanus acutigenia putilovoensis	Subsp. nov	Valid	Krylov	Ordovician (Dapingian)		Russia		
Erdbachaspis	Gen. et comb. nov	Valid	Müller & Hahn	Carboniferous (Mississippian)		Germany	A member of the family Phillipsiidae belonging to the subfamily Archegoninae. The type species is "Phillipsia" granulifera Holzapfel (1889); genus also includes E. aithyia (Hahn, Hahn & Müller, 2001), E. bathapoikos (Hahn, Hahn & Müller, 1998) and possibly "Proliobole" krambergensis Hahn, Hahn & Müller (1996).	
Harpes hamarlaghdadensis	Sp. nov	Valid	Crônier et al.	Devonian (Emsian)		Morocco	A member of Harpetida belonging to the family Harpetidae. Subsequently transferred to the genus Pinnuloharpes by Johnson (2024).	
Hebeia stewarti	Sp. nov	Valid	Smith, Paterson & Brock	Cambrian	Goyder Formation	Australia		
Ibexaspis coadyi	Sp. nov	Valid	McAdams, Adrain & Karim	Early Ordovician		United States		
Ibexaspis leuppi	Sp. nov	Valid	McAdams, Adrain & Karim	Early Ordovician		United States		
Ibexaspis rupauli	Sp. nov	Valid	McAdams, Adrain & Karim	Early Ordovician		United States		
Latibole gamma	Sp. nov	Valid	Müller & Hahn	Carboniferous (Mississippian)		Germany		
Latibole parapaprothae	Sp. nov	Valid	Müller & Hahn	Carboniferous (Mississippian)		Germany		
Latibole pleon	Sp. nov	Valid	Müller & Hahn	Carboniferous (Mississippian)		Germany		
Leonaspis bassei	Sp. nov	Valid	Alberti	Devonian (Emsian)		Germany		
Liebsteinella	Gen. et comb. et 2 sp. nov	Valid	Müller & Hahn	Carboniferous (Mississippian)		Germany	A member of the subfamily Cystispininae. The type species is "Tawstockia" martini Müller (2004); genus also includes new species L. sauerlandica and L. weberi.	
Liobole (Liobole) meyeri	Sp. nov	Valid	Müller & Hahn	Carboniferous (Mississippian)		Germany		
Liobole (Liobole) io	Sp. nov	Valid	Müller & Hahn	Carboniferous (Mississippian)		Germany		
Liobole (Panibole) emrichterae	Sp. nov	Valid	Müller & Hahn	Carboniferous (Mississippian)		Germany		
Liobole (Panibole) groeningae	Sp. nov	Valid	Müller & Hahn	Carboniferous (Mississippian)		Germany		
Liobole (Panibole) isis	Sp. nov	Valid	Müller & Hahn	Carboniferous (Mississippian)		Germany		
Liobole (Panibole) paraglabroides	Sp. nov	Valid	Müller & Hahn	Carboniferous (Mississippian)		Germany		
Liobole (Panibole) subaequalis hschmidti	Subsp. nov	Valid	Müller & Hahn	Carboniferous (Mississippian)		Germany		
Lioharpes wendti	Sp. nov	Valid	Feist & Belka	Devonian (Emsian)		Morocco		
Liostracina joyceae	Sp. nov	Valid	Smith, Paterson & Brock	Cambrian	Goyder Formation	Australia		
Longaspis	Gen. et sp. nov	Valid	Peng et al.	Cambrian Stage 4	Balang Formation	China	A member of the family Oryctocephalidae. Genus includes new species L. paiwuensis.	
Luciaspis	Gen. et sp. nov	Valid	Álvaro et al.	Cambrian	Huérmeda Formation	Spain	A saukiandid trilobite. Genus includes new species L. matiasi.	
Magreanops	Gen. et 2 sp. nov	Valid	Van Viersen & Vanherle	Devonian (Frasnian)	Bovesse Formation; Moulin Liénaux Formation	Belgium	A member of the family Phacopidae. The type species is M. renateae; genus also includes M. monachus.	
Maladioidella? destombesi	Sp. nov	Valid	Álvaro & Vizcaïno	Cambrian (Furongian)	Bailiella Formation	Morocco	A member of the family Idahoiidae.	
Millardaspis	Gen. et 2 sp. nov	Valid	McAdams, Adrain & Karim	Early Ordovician		United States	The type species is M. milsteadi; genus also includes M. knoxi.	
Morocops davidbrutoni	Sp. nov	Valid	Crônier et al.	Devonian (Emsian)		Morocco		
Neoillaenus	Gen. et comb. nov	Valid	Krylov	Ordovician (Darriwilian–Katian)		Estonia; Russia; Sweden	The type species is "Illaenus" excellens Holm (1886); genus also includes Neoillaenus atavus (Eichwald, 1857), N. oblongatus (Angelin, 1854), N. kukersianus (Holm, 1886), N. itferensis (Holm, 1886) and N. praecurriens (Jaanusson, 1957).	
Omegops tilabadensis	Sp. nov	Valid	Ghobadi Pour et al.	Devonian (Famennian)	Khoshyeilaq Formation	Iran	A member of the family Phacopidae.	
Onaraspis garciae	Sp. nov	Valid	Álvaro et al.	Cambrian	Huérmeda Formation	Spain	A saukiandid trilobite.	
Panderia balashovae	Sp. nov	Valid	Krylov	Early Ordovician		Russia		
Panderia koshkarovi	Sp. nov	Valid	Krylov	Ordovician (Darriwilian)		Russia		
Paulaspis	Gen. et sp. nov	Valid	Álvaro et al.	Cambrian	Huérmeda Formation	Spain	A saukiandid trilobite. Genus includes new species P. tiergaensis.	
Phacops ouarouroutensis	Sp. nov	Valid	Crônier et al.	Devonian	Chefar el Ahmar Formation	Algeria		
Phaetonellus dillensis	Sp. nov	Valid	Basse & Müller	Devonian		Germany		
Phaetonellus greifensteinensis	Sp. nov	Valid	Basse & Müller	Devonian		Germany		
Phaetonellus heckelmanni	Sp. nov	Valid	Basse & Müller	Devonian		Germany		
Phaetonellus kimi	Sp. nov	Valid	Basse & Müller	Devonian		Germany		
Phaetonellus martinius	Sp. nov	Valid	Basse & Müller	Devonian	Leun Limestone	Germany		
Perliproetus africanus	Sp. nov	Valid	Feist & Weyer	Devonian (Famennian)		Morocco		
Perliproetus kallenhardtensis	Sp. nov	Valid	Feist & Weyer	Devonian (Famennian)		Germany		
Pterocoryphe platymarginata	Sp. nov	Valid	Van Viersen & Vanherle	Devonian (Frasnian)	Champ Broquet Formation	Belgium	A member of the family Proetidae.	
Quadratispina excelsa	Sp. nov	Valid	Van Viersen & Vanherle	Devonian (Frasnian)	Bovesse Formation	Belgium	A member of the family Acastidae.	
Redlichia isuelaensis	Sp. nov	Valid	Álvaro et al.	Cambrian	Huérmeda Formation	Spain		
Spasskyproetus	Gen. et comb. nov	Valid	Basse & Müller	Devonian (Emsian)		Russia	A new genus for "Phaetonellus" bondarevi Spassky (1989).	
Spatulata (Spatulata?) pachycraspedata	Sp. nov	Valid	Müller & Hahn	Carboniferous (Mississippian)		Germany		
Spatulata (Spatulata) tilsleyi	Sp. nov	Valid	Müller & Hahn	Carboniferous (Mississippian)		Germany		
Stenopareia kossovae	Sp. nov	Valid	Krylov	Ordovician (Katian)		Russia		
Syspacephalus mccollumorum	Sp. nov	Valid	Sundberg	Cambrian	Emigrant Formation	United States	A member of Ptychopariida belonging to the group Ptychopariacea.	
Tawstockia longispina germanica	Subsp. nov	Valid	Müller & Hahn	Carboniferous (Mississippian)		Germany		
Toxophacops (Atopophacops) fujiwara	Sp. nov	Valid	Stocker et al.	Devonian (probably Givetian)	Naidaijin Formation	Japan		
Trephina	Gen. et sp. nov	Valid	Smith, Paterson & Brock	Cambrian	Goyder Formation	Australia	Genus includes new species T. ranfordi.	
Tuleaspis	Gen. et sp. nov	Valid	McAdams, Adrain & Karim	Early Ordovician		United States	The type species is T. jeneki.	
Xylomelon	Gen. et comb. et sp. nov	Valid	Müller & Hahn	Carboniferous (Mississippian)		Germany	A member of the subfamily Cystispininae. The type species is "Xenadoche" kalliroe Hahn, Hahn & Müller (1996); genus also includes X. agenor (Hahn, Hahn & Müller, 2000), X. elissa (Hahn, Hahn & Müller, 2000) and X. medusa (Hahn, Hahn & Müller, 1999), as well as new species X. xenios.	

== Other arthropods ==
=== Research ===
- A study on the external and internal anatomy and possible lifestyle of Waptia fieldensis, based on revision of all available specimens available from the repositories in the National Museum of Natural History and the Royal Ontario Museum, is published by Vannier et al. (2018).
- A study on the lateral tail flexibility in the eurypterid Slimonia acuminata published by Persons & Acorn (2017) is criticized by Lamsdell, Marshall & Briggs (2018); Persons (2018) defends his original conclusions on the basis of a study of additional eurypterid specimens.
- A study on the microstructure of gnathobasic spines on the coxa of extant Atlantic horseshoe crab, Silurian eurypterid Eurypterus tetragonophthalmus and Cambrian artiopodan Sidneyia inexpectans is published by Bicknell et al. (2018).
- A study on the mechanical performance of the feeding appendages of Sidneyia inexpectans, based on comparisons with extant Atlantic horseshoe crab, is published by Bicknell et al. (2018).
- Bicknell, Pates & Botton (2018) report abnormalities in specimens of extant (Limulus polyphemus, Tachypleus tridentatus) and fossil (Euproops danae, Mesolimulus walchi) horseshoe crabs, and compare injuries to horseshoe crab cephalothoraces to those affecting Cambrian trilobites to explore the possible timing of the injuries.
- Sánchez-García et al. (2018) report the presence of probable male clasping organs for courtship and securing the female during copulation in the springtail Pseudosminthurides stoechus and an aggregation of up to 45 specimens of the springtail Proisotoma communis from the Cretaceous amber from Spain.
- Closely associated arthropleurid trackways, interpreted as evidence of arthropleurid mating behaviour, are described from the Lower Carboniferous of Fife (Scotland, United Kingdom) by Whyte (2018).
- Two immature specimens of polyxenidan millipedes are described from the Eocene Bitterfeld amber (Germany) by Haug et al. (2018).
- First known millipede fossil material from Central America (disarticulated trunk segments of members of the genus Nyssodesmus from the late Pleistocene of Costa Rica) is described by Laurito & Valerio (2018).
- Insect resting traces and arthropod trackways are described from the Eocene Mount Wawel Formation (King George Island, Antarctica) by Uchman, Gaździcki & Błażejowski (2018), who name a new ichnofamily Protichnidae and a new ichnospecies Glaciichnium australis.
- Revision of blood-feeding arthropods from the Paleogene Baltic amber is published by Pielowska, Sontag & Szadziewski (2018).

=== New taxa ===
Name	Novelty	Status	Authors	Age	Unit	Location	Notes	Images
Adelophthalmus khakassicus	Sp. nov	Valid	Shpinev & Filimonov	Devonian (Givetian)		Russia	An eurypterid.	
Alutella siku	Sp. nov	Valid	Peel & Willman	Cambrian Series 2	Buen Formation	Greenland	A member of Bradoriida.	
Concavicaris viktoryni	Sp. nov	Valid	Rak, Broda & Kumpan	Carboniferous		Czech Republic	A member of Thylacocephala (a group of arthropods of uncertain phylogenetic placement, possibly crustaceans). Originally described as a species of Concavicaris; Broda, Rak & Hegna (2020) made it the type species of a separate genus Paraconcavicaris.	
Eodiscus coloholcus	Sp. nov	Valid	Westrop, Broda & Dengler	Cambrian	Shallow Bay Formation	Canada	A member of Agnostida belonging to the family Eodiscidae.	
Eodiscus confossus	Sp. nov	Valid	Westrop, Broda & Dengler	Cambrian	Manuels River Formation	Canada	A member of Agnostida belonging to the family Eodiscidae.	
Eodiscus tuberculus	Sp. nov	Valid	Westrop, Broda & Dengler	Cambrian	Manuels River Formation	Canada	A member of Agnostida belonging to the family Eodiscidae.	
Gogglops	Gen. et sp. nov	Valid	Siveter et al.	Ordovician		China	A member of Aglaspidida. Genus includes new species G. ensifer.	
Isoxys globulus	Sp. nov	Valid	Liu et al.	Cambrian Stage 4	Balang Formation	China		
Isoxys jianheensis	Sp. nov	Valid	Liu et al.	Cambrian Stage 4	Balang Formation	China		
Messorocaris	Gen. et sp. nov	Valid	Lerosey-Aubril & Skabelund	Cambrian (Drumian)	Wheeler Formation	United States	A possible relative of Sanctacaris. The type species is M. magna.	
Misszhouia canadensis	Sp. nov	Valid	Mayers, Aria & Caron	Wuliuan	Burgess Shale	Canada	A member of the family Naraoiidae.	
Naraoia arcana	Sp. nov	Valid	Mayers, Aria & Caron	Wuliuan	Burgess Shale	Canada	A member of the family Naraoiidae.	
Naraoia magna	Sp. nov	Valid	Mayers, Aria & Caron	Wuliuan	Burgess Shale	Canada	A member of the family Naraoiidae.	
Pagetia aspinosa	Sp. nov	Valid	Sundberg	Cambrian	Emigrant Formation	United States		
Pagetia claytonensis	Sp. nov	Valid	Sundberg	Cambrian	Emigrant Formation	United States		
Permocrassacus	Gen. et sp. nov	Valid	Khramov et al.	Permian (Kungurian)	Koshelevka Formation	Russia	A member of Scolopendromorpha of uncertain phylogenetic placement. The type species is P. novokshonovi.	
Permocryptops	Gen. et sp. nov	Valid	Khramov et al.	Late Permian	Poldarsa Formation	Russia	A member of Scolopendromorpha of uncertain phylogenetic placement. The type species is P. shelleyi.	
Sinosoma	Gen. et sp. nov	Valid	Huang et al.	Middle Triassic		China	A helminthomorph millipede sharing a number of characters with nematophorans. Genus includes new species S. luopingense.	
Soligorskopterus	Gen. et sp. nov	Valid	Plax et al.	Devonian (Famennian)	Soligorsk Formation	Belarus	A eurypterid. Genus includes new species S. tchepeliensis.	
Symphylella patrickmuelleri	Sp. nov	Valid	Moritz & Wesener	Late Cretaceous (Cenomanian)	Burmese amber	Myanmar	A member of Symphyla belonging to the family Scolopendrellidae.	
Woodesmus	Gen. et sp. nov	Valid	Ross, Edgecombe & Clark in Ross et al.	Carboniferous (Tournaisian)	Ballagan Formation	United Kingdom	A millipede belonging to the group Archipolypoda, assigned to the new family Woodesmidae. Genus includes new species W. sheari.	
Xiphosuroides	Gen. et sp. nov	Valid	Shpinev & Vasilenko	Carboniferous	Sarskaya Formation	Russia	Probably a xiphosuran (order Xiphosura) belonging to the suborder Xiphosurida and the infraorder Belinurina. Genus includes new species X. khakassicus.	
