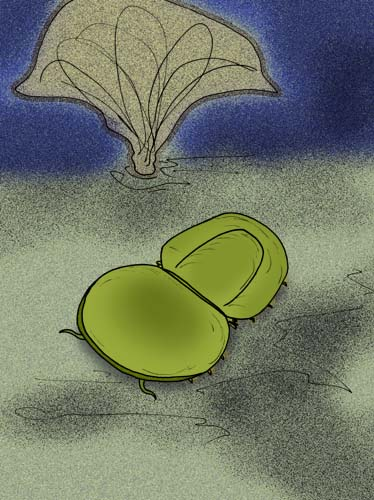

Scientific classification
- Kingdom: Animalia
- Phylum: Arthropoda
- Clade: †Artiopoda
- Order: †Nektaspida
- Family: †Naraoiidae
- Genus: †Pseudonaraoia; Budil, Fatka & Bruthansová, 2003
- Species: †P. hammanni

Binomial name
- †Pseudonaraoia hammanni Budil, Fatka & Bruthansová, 2003

= Pseudonaraoia =

Pseudonaraoia Temporal range: Darriwillian

Extinct genus of arthropods

Pseudonaraoia is a genus of small (about 1.75 centimetres (0.69 in) long) marine arthropods within the family Naraoiidae, that lived during the late Middle Ordovician period (or Darriwillian epoch). The only species presently known is Pseudonaraoia hammanni (the genus is monotypic).

== Etymology ==
The genus name indicates the likeness to the related genus Naraoia. The species was named in honor of Dr. Wolfgang Hammann (†2002), the outstanding German palaeontologist who studied both trilobites and naraoids.

== Description ==
Pseudonaraoia hammanni is almost flat (dorso-ventrally). The upper (or dorsal) side of the body consists of a non-calcified headshield (cephalon) and tailshield (pygidium) of about equal length, without any body segments in between. The body is strongly narrowed at the articulation between cephalon and pygidium. Both shields have a narrow border, reminiscent of some effaced agnostid trilobites. The axis is not defined by furrows. There are no eyes. Appendages and internal organs are not yet known.

=== Differences with other Naraoiidae ===
Naraoia and Misszhouia are narrowed, less pronounced at the articulation between cephalon and pygidium. Only Naraoia bertiensis shares a marginal border with P. hammanni, but it can be distinguished by its slightly pointed pygidial termination.

== Distribution ==
Pseudonaraoia has been collected from lower part of the Šárka Formation, Middle Ordovician (Darriwillian), at a temporary exposure of the Červený vrch Hill, in Prague, representing the Barrandian Basin, Czech Republic.

== Ecology ==
All naraoids were probably marine bottom dwellers. P. hammanni lived in an environment that was most probably poor in oxygen.

== Taxonomic history ==
Only one entire exoskeleton and one pygidium have been found. The authors that described Pseudonaraoia, note its resemblance to effaced agnostids such as Leiopyge, that are contemporary. They cannot rule out that Pseudonaraoia might actually represent a freak composite of the cephalon and pygidium of such an agnostid, without its two thorax segments. However, no agnostids are known as large as about 1¾cm from the Middle Ordovician. Leiopyge also has a prominent marginal pygidial furrow. Later scholars seem to accept the validity of the genus.
