= Pavocosa =

Scientific classification
- Kingdom: Animalia
- Phylum: Arthropoda
- Subphylum: Chelicerata
- Class: Arachnida
- Order: Araneae
- Infraorder: Araneomorphae
- Family: Lycosidae
- Genus: Pavocosa; Roewer

Species
- Pavocosa feisica (Strand, 1915); Pavocosa gallopavo (Mello-Leitão, 1941); Pavocosa herteli (Mello-Leitão, 1947); Pavocosa langei (Mello-Leitão, 1947); Pavocosa siamensis (Giebel, 1863)

Genus of spiders

Pavocosa is a genus of spiders in the family Lycosidae. It was first described in 1960 by Roewer. As of 2017, it contains 5 species.
