= Schizocytheridae =

Scientific classification
- Kingdom: Animalia
- Phylum: Arthropoda
- Clade: Pancrustacea
- Class: Ostracoda
- Family: Schizocytheridae

Family of crustaceans

Schizocytheridae is a family of crustaceans belonging to the order Ostracoda.

Genera:

- Acuminocythere Swain & Gilby, 1974
- Amphicytherura Butler & Jones, 1957
- Apateloschizocythere Bate, 1972
- Neomonoceratina Kingma, 1948
- Paraschizocythere
- Spinoceratin Mostafawi, 1992
