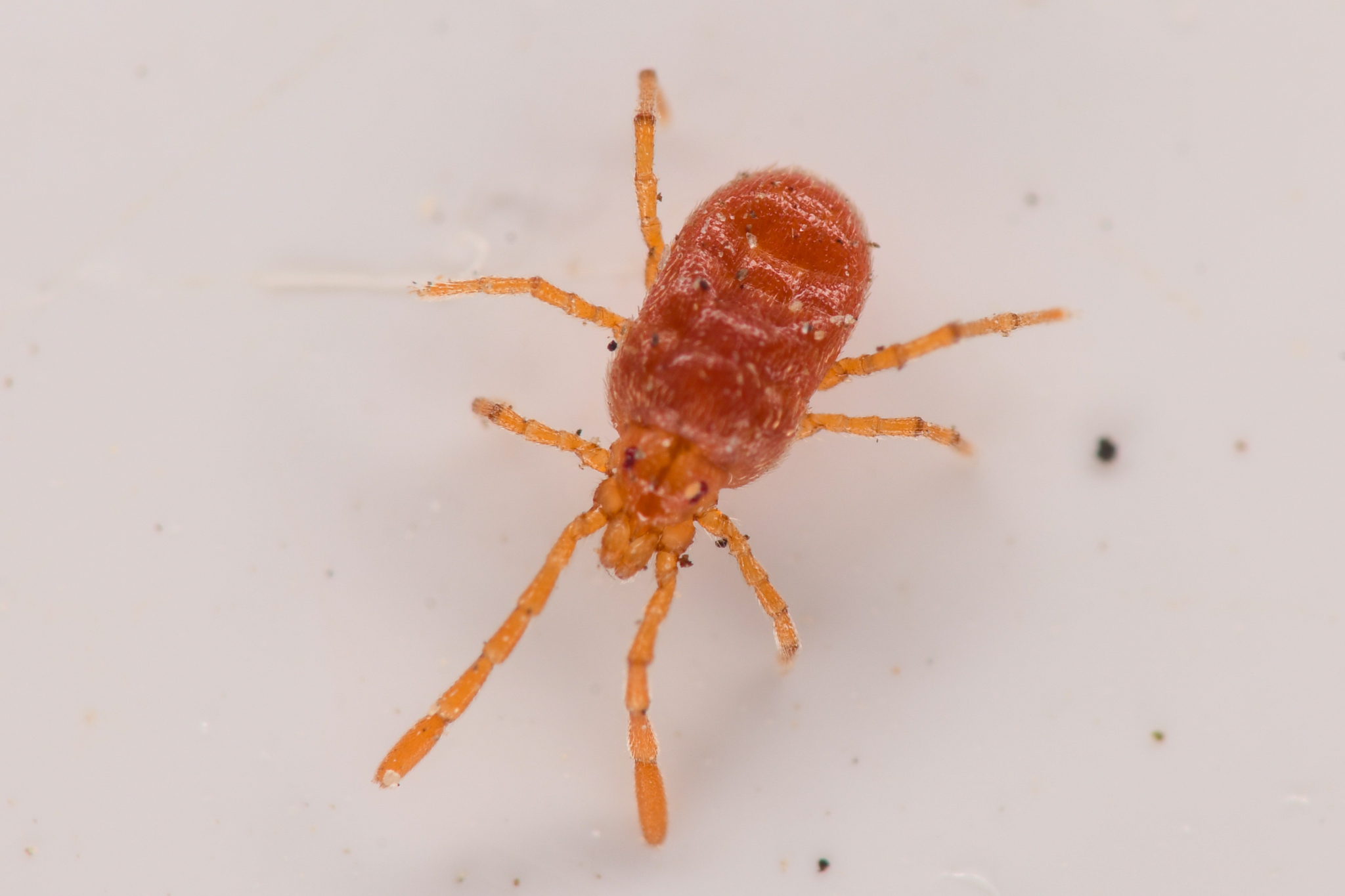

Scientific classification
- Domain: Eukaryota
- Kingdom: Animalia
- Phylum: Arthropoda
- Subphylum: Chelicerata
- Class: Arachnida
- Order: Trombidiformes
- Family: Tanaupodidae; Thor, 1935

Synonyms
- Tanaupodastridae

= Tanaupodidae =

Family of trombidiform mites

Tanaupodidae is a family of mites belonging to the order Trombidiformes.

Genera:

- Atanaupodus Judson & Makol, 2009
- Eothrombium Berlese, 1910
- Lassenia Newell, 1957
- Neotanaupodus Garman, 1925
- Neotyphlothrombium Robaux, 1968
- Paratanaupodus Andre & Lelievre-Farjon, 1960
- Paratyphlothrombium Robaux, 1968
- Polydiscia Methlagl, 1928
- Rhinothrombium Berlese, 1910
- Tanaupoda Haller, 1882
- Tanaupodaster Vitzthum, 1933
- Tanaupodus Haller, 1882
- Tignyia Oudemans, 1936
