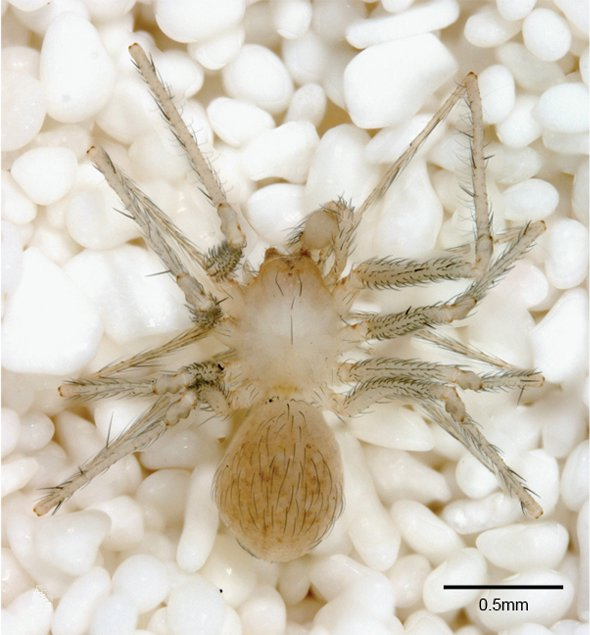
- Adult male of Tayshaneta anopica, a member of the Leptonetidae

Scientific classification
- Kingdom: Animalia
- Phylum: Arthropoda
- Subphylum: Chelicerata
- Class: Arachnida
- Order: Araneae
- Infraorder: Araneomorphae
- Superfamily: Leptonetoidea; Simon, 1890

Families
- †Praeterleptonetidae; †Protoaraneoididae; See text.

= Leptonetoidea =

Superfamily of arachnids

The Leptonetoidea are a superfamily of haplogyne araneomorph spiders with three families. Phylogenetic studies have provided weak support for the relationship among the families. The placement of one of the families within the Haplogynae has been questioned.

== Phylogeny ==
Leptonoidea has been circumscribed to contain the following families:

- Leptonetidae
- Ochyroceratidae
- Telemidae

The three families have been placed in the Haplogynae, one of the two main groups of araneomorph spiders, with the internal relationships as in the following cladogram. The clade has only weak support.

- - Ochyroceratidae
  - - Leptonetidae
    - Telemidae

Subsequent to the analyses that produced the relationships shown above, it was discovered that one leptonetid genus, Archoleptoneta, has a cribellum. Placing Leptonetidae as a derived member of the Haplogynae would require independent evolution of the cribellum. Other characters also suggest that leptonetids are "proto-entelegynes", belonging on their own in a superfamily.
