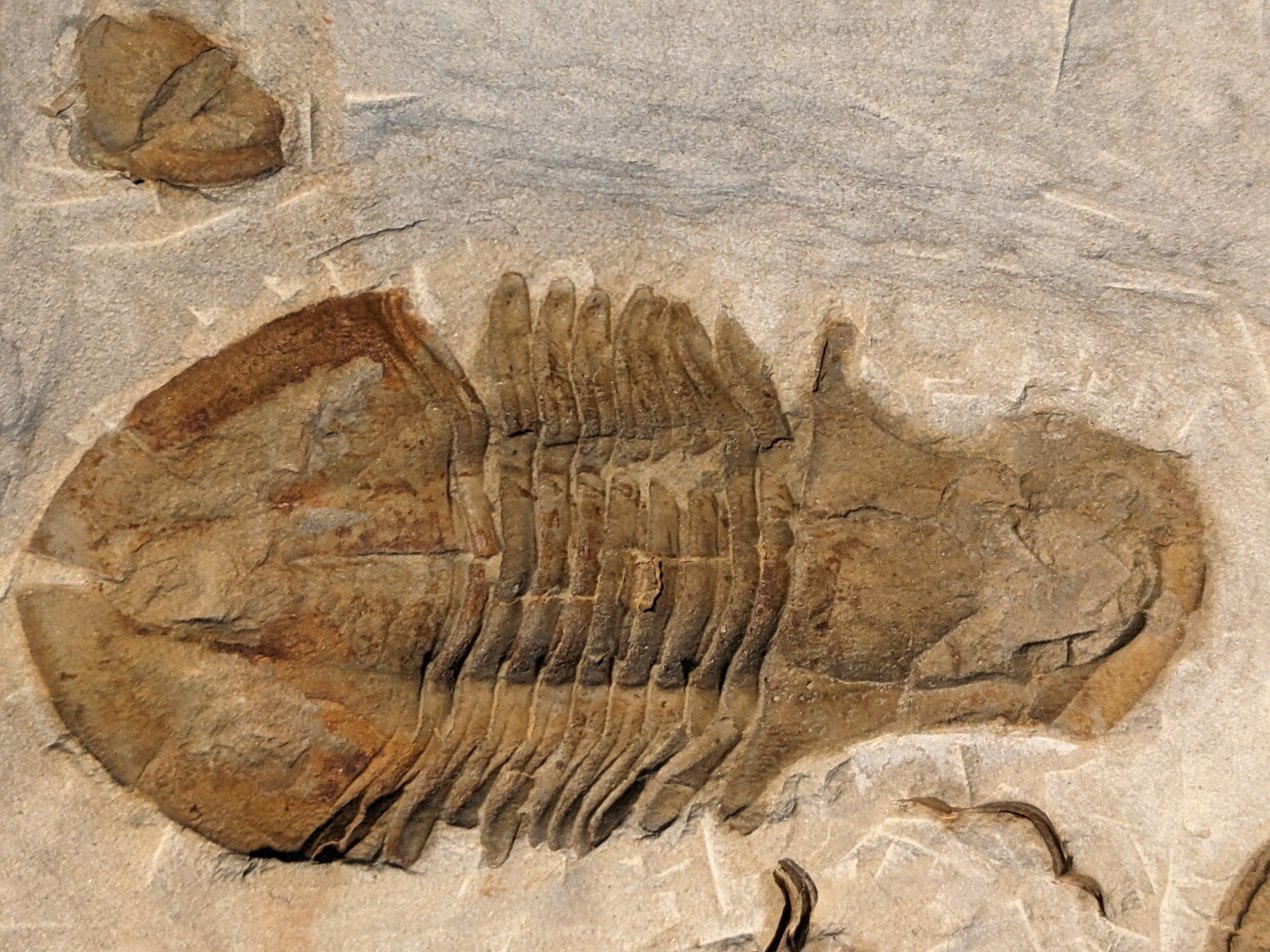
- Liobole glabra

Scientific classification
- Kingdom: Animalia
- Phylum: Arthropoda
- Clade: †Artiopoda
- Class: †Trilobita
- Order: †Proetida
- Family: †Proetidae
- Genus: †Liobole; Richter and Richter, 1949

Species
- Liobole galaxaura Hahn et al., 1996; Liobole glabroides (Richter & Richter, 1949); Liobole liebsteinensis Hahn et al., 1996; Liobole peregrina Engel & Morris, 1980; Liobole massinissa Müller, Hahn & Becker, 2026

= Liobole =

Liobole Temporal range: 360–341 Ma Tournaisian - Early Viséan

Extinct genus of trilobites

Liobole is an extinct genus of lower Carboniferous proetid trilobite.

== Etymology ==
Liobole was described from material found in the Moravian Karst. The species shown is from the lower carboniferous of SW England.

== Distribution ==
Liobole is found in the European Culm facies and has been collected from the lower Carboniferous across Europe from (Viséan) deposits of SW England and (Tournaisian) of Poland as far east as China.Fossils have also been discovered in Morocco.

== Taxonomy ==
Identified as proetid trilobite from the lower Viséan Brezina formation by Chlupáč 1966.
