= Boltysh crater =

Asteroid mpact, Kirovohrad Oblast, Ukraine

- Location within Ukraine
- Location: Location in Ukraine, Kirovohrad Oblast, Ukraine; 48°45′N 32°10′E

Impact crater structure
- Confidence: Confirmed
- Diameter: 24 kilometres (15 mi)
- Depth: 550 metres (1,800 ft)
- Age: 65.39 ± 0.14/0.16 mya, Danian
- Exposed: No
- Drilled: Yes

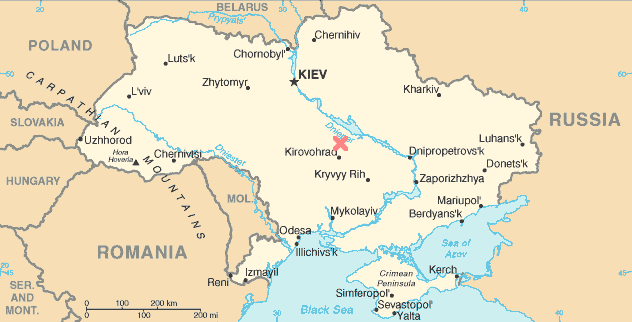
Location of the Boltysh crater

The Boltysh crater or Bovtyshka crater is a buried impact crater in the Kirovohrad Oblast of Ukraine, near the village of Bovtyshka. The crater is 24 kilometres (15 mi) in diameter and its age of 65.39 ± 0.14/0.16 million years, based on argon-argon dating techniques, less than 1 million years younger than Chicxulub crater in Mexico and the Cretaceous–Paleogene boundary (K–Pg boundary). The Chicxulub impact is believed to have caused the mass extinction at the end of the Cretaceous period, which included the extinction of the non-avian dinosaurs. The Boltysh crater is currently thought to be unrelated to the Chicxulub impact, and to have not generated major global environmental effects.

== Overview ==
Boltysh crater is located in central Ukraine, in the basin of the Tiasmyn River, a tributary of the Dnieper River. It is 24 kilometres (15 mi) in diameter, and is surrounded by an ejecta blanket of breccia preserved over an area of 6,500 square kilometres (2,500 sq mi). It is estimated that immediately after the impact, ejecta covered an area of 25,000 square kilometres (9,700 sq mi) to a depth of 1 metre (3.3 ft) or greater, and was some 600 metres (2,000 ft) deep at the crater rim.

The crater contains a central uplift about 6 kilometres (3.7 mi) in diameter, rising about 550 metres (1,800 ft) above the base level of the crater. This uplift currently lies beneath about 500 metres (1,600 ft) of sediment deposited since the impact, and was discovered in the 1960s during oil shale deposits exploration.

== Age ==
The Boltysh depression was identified as a fossil meteorite crater by 1975. By 1987, it was dated to 100 ± 12 million years old. Early age estimates could only be roughly constrained between the age of the impacted rocks (the target) and the age of overlying sediments. The target rocks date from the Cenomanian (98.9 to 93.5 million years ago) and Turonian (93.5 to 89 million years ago) epochs. Bore samples of sediments overlying the crater contain fossils dating from the Paleocene epoch, 66 to 54.8 million years ago. The age of the crater was thus constrained to between 54 and 98 million years.

Subsequent radiometric dating reduced the uncertainty. The concentration of U_{238} decay products in impact glasses from the crater were used to derive an age of 65.04 ± 1.10 million years. A 2002 analysis of argon radioactive decay products yielded an age of 65.17 ± 0.64 million years. While these radiometric dating measurements place the Boltysh crater hundreds of thousands of years after the Chicxulub crater, a 2010 radiometric and palynological study of fern spore (fern spikes) abundance suggested the Boltysh impact may have occurred several thousand years before Chicxulub. However, in response, a follow-up study in 2021 estimated using argon–argon dating that Boltysh formed about 65.39 ± 0.14/0.16 million years ago, 650,000 years after the Chicxulub catastrophe, and suggested that the fern spike was plausibly a result of the impact itself. The authors of the paper suggested that the impact may have disrupted recovery after the K/Pg extinction.
