= Ibexaspis =

Scientific classification
- Domain: Eukaryota
- Kingdom: Animalia
- Phylum: Arthropoda
- Class: †Trilobita
- Order: †Phacopida
- Family: †Pliomeridae
- Genus: †Ibexaspis; Pribyl & Vanek in Pribyl et al., 1985

Extinct genus of trilobites

Ibexaspis is a genus of trilobites in the order Phacopida (family Pliomeridae), that existed during the lower Ordovician in what is now the United States. It was described by Pribyl and Vanek in 1985, and the type species is Ibexaspis quattuor, which was originally described under the genus Protopliomerops as the subspecies P. quattuor brevis by Young in 1973. The type locality was the Fillmore Formation in Utah.
