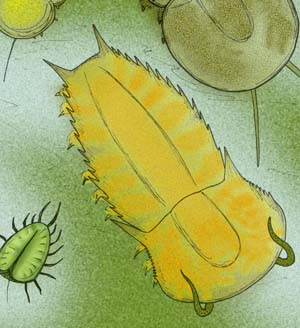
- Naraoia spinosa

Scientific classification
- Kingdom: Animalia
- Phylum: Arthropoda
- Clade: †Artiopoda
- Order: †Nektaspida
- Family: †Naraoiidae; Walcott, 1912

Genera
- Misszhouia; Naraoia; ?Pseudonaraoia

= Naraoiidae =

Naraoiidae Temporal range: 526–416 Ma Late Atdabanian-Pridoli

Family of arthropods (fossil)

Naraoiidae is a family, of extinct, soft-shelled trilobite-like arthropods, that belongs to the order Nektaspida. Species included in the Naraoiidae are known from the second half of the Lower Cambrian to the end of the Upper Silurian. The total number of collection sites is limited and distributed over a vast period of time: Maotianshan Shale and Balang Formation (China), Burgess Shale and Bertie Formation (Canada), the Šárka Formation (Czech Republic), Emu Bay Shale (Australia), Idaho and Utah (US). This is probably due to the rare occurrence of the right circumstances for soft tissue preservation, needed for these non-calcified exoskeletons.

== Ecology ==
Naraoiids probably were deposit feeders (Naraoia and Pseudonaraoia), predators or scavengers (Misszhouia), living on the sea floor.

== Description ==
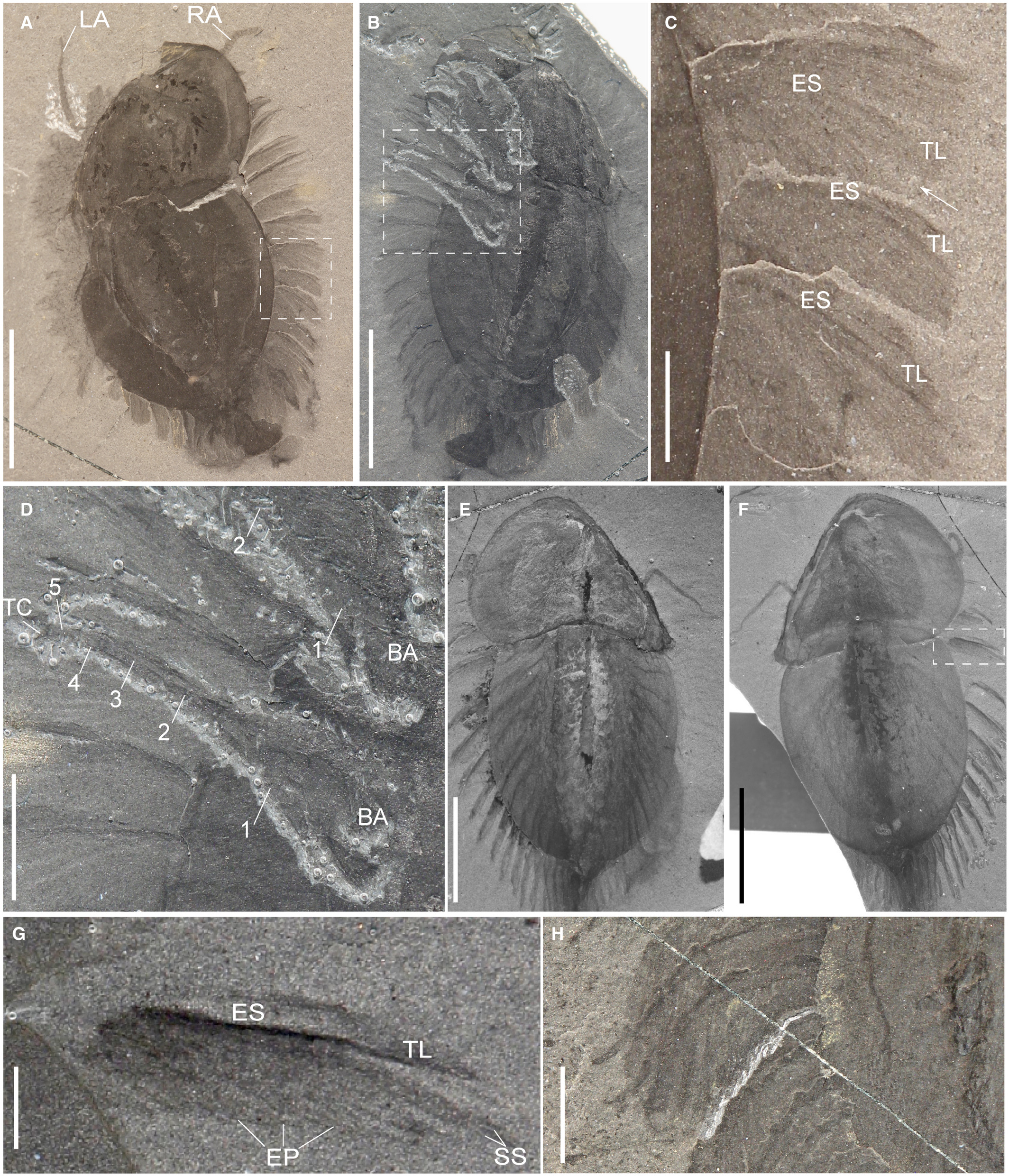
Fossils of Naraoia compacta

The species of the family Naraoiidae are almost flat (dorso-ventrally). The upper (or dorsal) side of the body consists of a non-calcified transversely oval or semi-circular headshield (cephalon), and a circular to long oval tailshield (pygidium) equal to or longer than the cephalon, without any body segments in between. The body is narrowed at the articulation between cephalon and pygidium. The antennas are long and many-segmented. There are no eyes. The 17 to 25 pairs of legs have two branches on a common basis, like trilobites. The outer (dorsal) branches of the limbs (exopods) have flattened side branches (setae) on the shaft (probably acting as gills). The inner branches (or endopods are composed of 6 or 7 segments (or podomeres).

=== Differences with other Nectaspida ===
Naraoiidae lack thoracic segments (or tergites), while the species of the sister family Liwiidae have between 3 and 6 tergites.

== Taxonomic history ==
The taxonomic placement of the Naraoiidae has long been debated until detailed appendages were uncovered, that showed that N. compacta shares biramous legs of very comparable anatomy with trilobites. Some debate is still going on if the parent taxon Nektaspida should be included in the Trilobita, or is better placed as a sister group.

== Key to the genera ==
1	Pygidium less than 1 1/2× as long (along the axis) as the cephalon; If the digestive system is visual, gut more than 1/8 of the width of the body, with branched diverticula filling most of the cephalon; Antennas implanted laterally. Margin of cephalon and/or pygidium spined or entire. 17 to 19 pairs of biramous legs. → Naraoia
-	Pygidium more than 1 3/4× as long as the cephalon; If the digestive system is visual, gut less than 1/8 of the width of the body, with four pairs of small bifurcating sacs of equal size reaching at most 1/3 of the width of the cephalon; Antennas implanted anteriorly. Margins of cephalon and pygidium entire. 25 pairs of biramous legs. Up to 6 cm in length. → Misszhouia longicaudata (Zhang & Hou 1985), jr. syn. Naraoia longicaudata
