= Misionella =

Scientific classification
- Kingdom: Animalia
- Phylum: Arthropoda
- Subphylum: Chelicerata
- Class: Arachnida
- Order: Araneae
- Infraorder: Araneomorphae
- Family: Filistatidae
- Genus: Misionella; Ramírez & Grismado, 1997

Type species
- M. mendensis (Mello-Leitão, 1920)

Species
- 5, see text

Genus of spiders

Misionella is a genus of South American crevice weavers that was first described by M. J. Ramírez & C. J. Grismado in 1997. In 2005 a spider fossil found in 15- to 20-million-year-old Miocene amber from the Dominican Republic was described as Misionella didicostae. A second specimen was discussed soon thereafter.

== Species ==
As of May 2019 it contains five species from Brazil and Argentina:

- Misionella aikewara Brescovit, Magalhaes & Cizauskas, 2016 – Brazil
- Misionella carajas Brescovit, Magalhaes & Cizauskas, 2016 – Brazil
- Misionella jaminawa Grismado & Ramírez, 2000 – Brazil
- Misionella mendensis (Mello-Leitão, 1920) (type) – Brazil, Argentina
- Misionella pallida Brescovit, Magalhaes & Cizauskas, 2016 – Brazil
