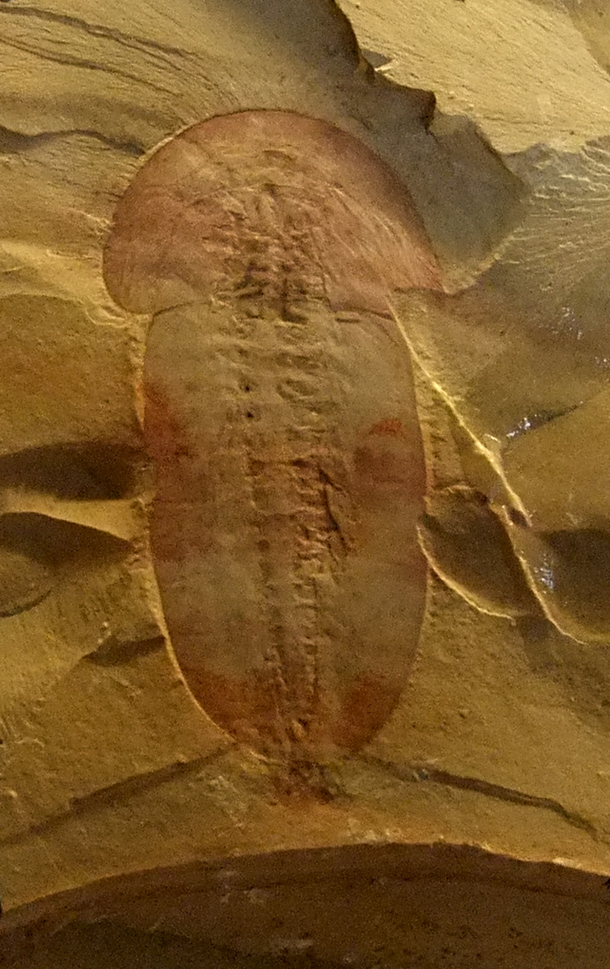
- M. longicaudata fossil
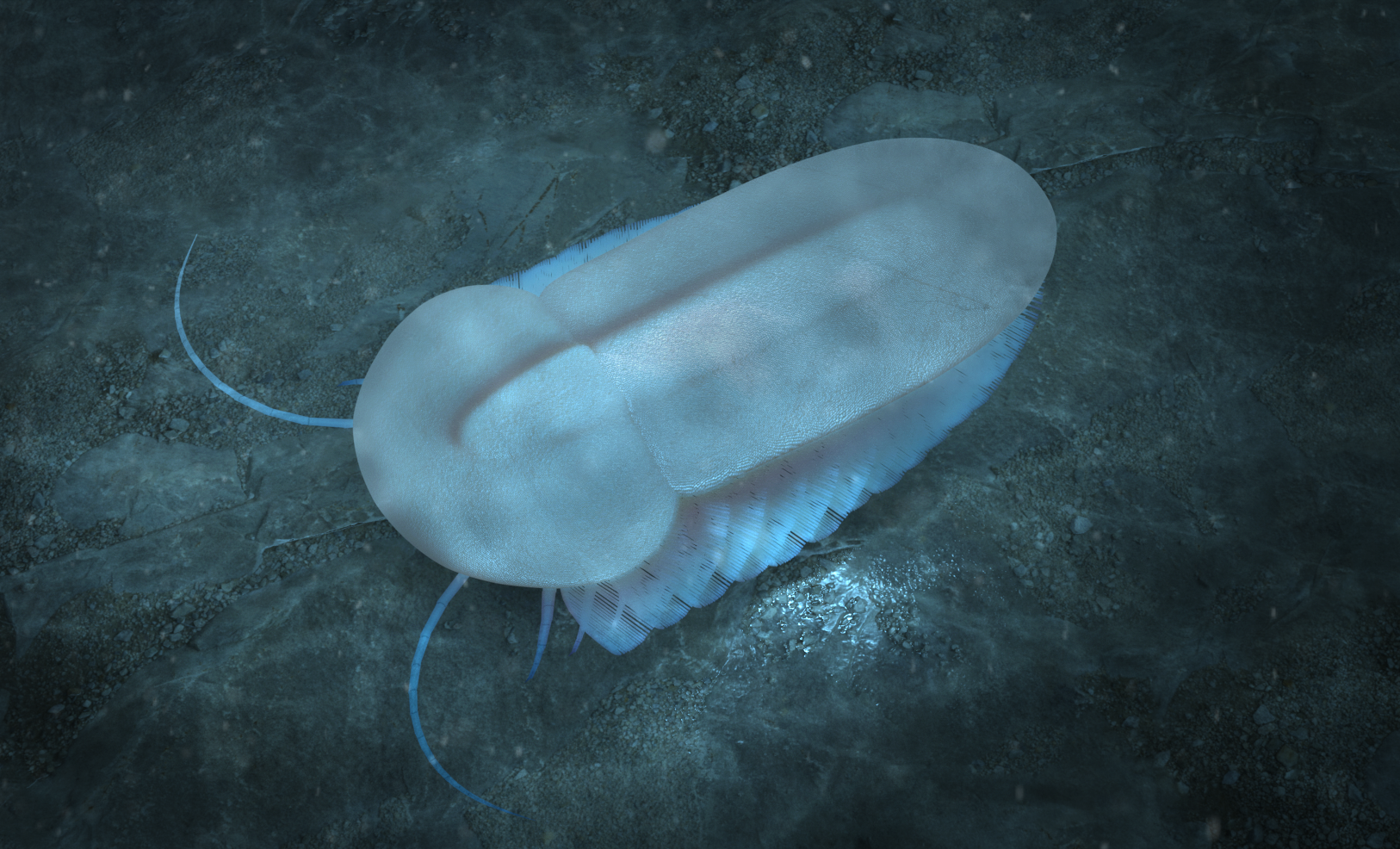
- Life restoration of M. longicaudata

Scientific classification
- Kingdom: Animalia
- Phylum: Arthropoda
- Clade: †Artiopoda
- Order: †Nektaspida
- Family: †Naraoiidae
- Genus: †Misszhouia; Chen, Edgecombe & Ramsköld 1997

Species
- M. canadensis Mayers, Aria & Caron, 2018; M. longicaudata (Zhang & Hou 1985) (type)

Synonyms
- Naraoia longicaudata Zhang & Hou 1985

= Misszhouia =

Misszhouia Temporal range: Atdabanian

Extinct genus of trilobites

Misszhouia is a genus of small to average sized (up to 6 centimetres (2.4 in) long) marine trilobite-like arthropods within the Naraoiidae family, that lived during the early Cambrian period. The species are M. longicaudata, from the Maotianshan Shales, described in 1985, and M. canadensis, from the Burgess Shale and described in 2018, although later species may belongs to genus Naraoia instead.

== Etymology ==
Misszhouia was named after "Miss Zhou" (Zhou Guiqin), to honour her for her skilled preparation of Chengjiang fossils.

== Description ==
Size comparison of two species of Misszhouia

Misszhouia longicaudata is almost flat (dorso-ventrally). The upper (or dorsal) side of the body consists of a non-calcified headshield (cephalon) and tailshield (pygidium) without body segments between. The body is narrowed at the articulation between cephalon and pygidium. The long many-segmented antennae are directed forward. There are no eyes. The gut has a relatively small diameter, and there are four pairs of relatively small digestive sacs (or caeca) in the cephalon only, and no branches towards the edge of the cephalon (unlike Naraoia). There are 25 limb pairs with two branches on a common base, like Naraoia and trilobites. The outer branch (or exopod) has many parallel long fine flattened side branches (setae) that probably functioned as gills with a large surface area. This exopod is attached along the whole length of the base segment (coxa) and at least the proximal part of the first segment of the inner branch (endopod). The shaft of the exopod tapers gently towards its tip. The endopod is composed of seven podomeres including a terminal claw.

=== Differences from Naraoia ===
The sister genus Naraoia differ from Misszhouia longicaudata in having the following characteristics:

- A large, ramifying anterior pair of digestive branches (or diverticula) almost reaching the cephalon edges.
- A bloated, mud-filled gut.
- Laterally deflected antennae.

== Distribution ==
Misszhouia longicaudata has been collected from the Lower Cambrian (late Atdabanian) of China (Yu'anshan Member of the Heilinpu Formation at Maotia’shan, the classic Chengjiang locality) and also been found in the Niutitang Formation. Misszhouia canadensis is known from the Middle Cambrian Burgess Shale in the Marble Canyon (Kootenay National Park).

== Ecology ==
All Naraoids were probably marine bottom dwellers. Misszhouia probably lived as a predator or scavenger. This can be deduced from the robust and spiny basal segments of the legs, which resemble the gnathobases of trilobites. These were likely used for chewing. Such carnivorous behaviour is confirmed by the relatively small digestive system, that indicates high nutrition value food.

== Taxonomy ==
Misszhouia longicaudata was formerly considered a member of the genus Naraoia, originally known as "Naraoia longicaudata", until separated in 1997. A cladistic analysis conducted in 2021 suggested that Misszhouia represented a monophyletic subgroup within Naraoia as traditionally broadly defined.
