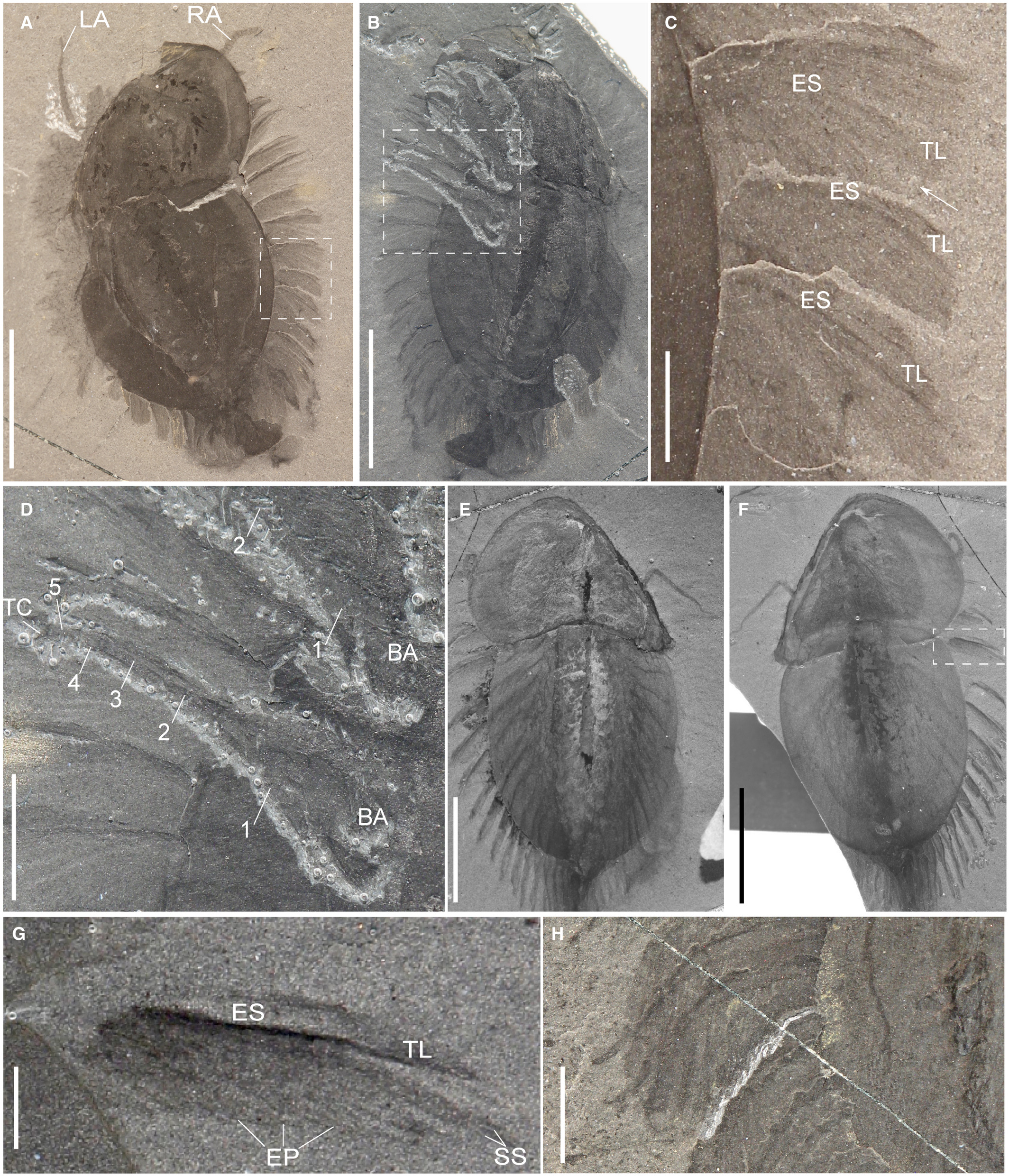
- Fossils of Naraoia compacta
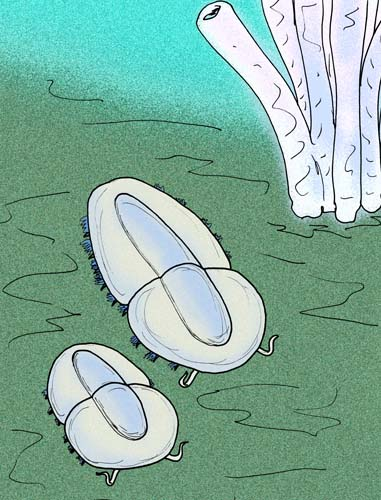
- Life restoration of Naraoia compacta

Scientific classification
- Kingdom: Animalia
- Phylum: Arthropoda
- Clade: †Artiopoda
- Order: †Nektaspida
- Family: †Naraoiidae
- Genus: †Naraoia; Walcott, 1912

Type species
- Naraoia compacta Walcott, 1912

Species
- N. arcana Mayers, Aria & Caron, 2018; N. bertiensis Caron, Rudjin & Millken 2004; N. compacta Walcott, 1912; N. magna Mayers, Aria & Caron, 2018; N. spinifer Walcott 1931; N. spinosa Zhang & Hou, 1985; N. taijiangensis Peng, Zhou & Sun 2012

= Naraoia =

Naraoia Temporal range: Cambrian Stage 3–Late Silurian

Extinct genus of arthropods

Naraoia is a genus of small-to-average-size (about 2–4.5 cm [0.8–1.8 in] long) marine arthropods within the family Naraoiidae, that lived from the early Cambrian to the late Silurian period. The species are characterized by a large alimentary system and sideways oriented antennas.

== Etymology ==
The name is derived from Narao, the name of a group of small lakes in Cataract Brook canyon, above Hector on the Canadian Pacific Railway, British Columbia, Canada.

== History of the classification ==
When the fossil was first discovered in Canada's Burgess Shale, it was believed to be a crustacean, such was the difference between this and other trilobites. Its continuous shield hid most of its structure, interfering with proper classification. When Harry B. Whittington began dissecting some specimens (Naraoia was among the most populous of the Burgess Shale animals), he discovered that the legs (and gills) of the beasts were very similar, if not identical to those of trilobites, thus the current placement of Naraoia in class Trilobita. Misszhouia longicaudata was formerly considered a member of the genus Naraoia, originally known as N. longicaudata, until separated in 1997.

== Description ==
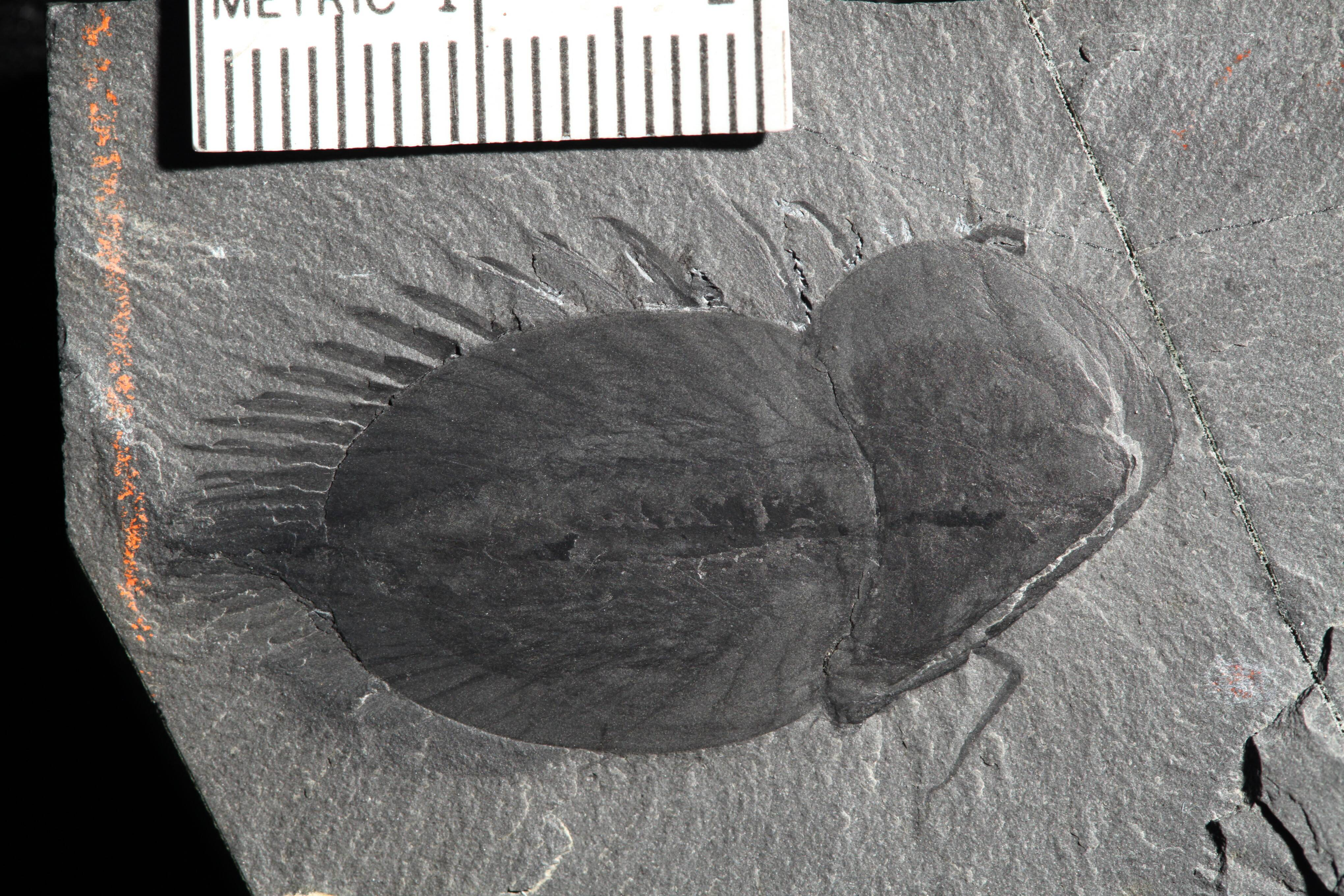
Fossil lectotype of N. compacta

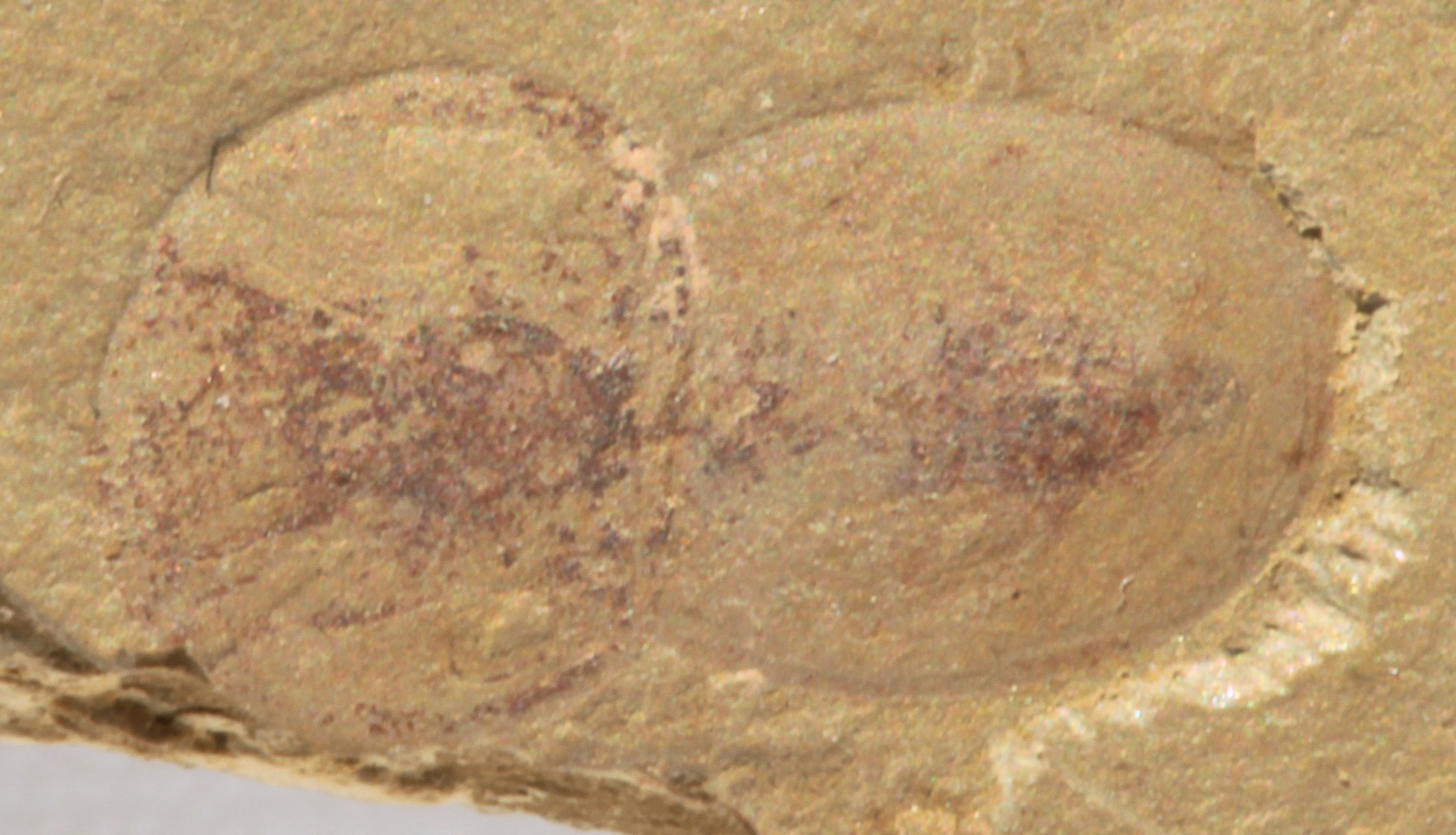
Fossil of N. taijiangensis

Size comparison of all species

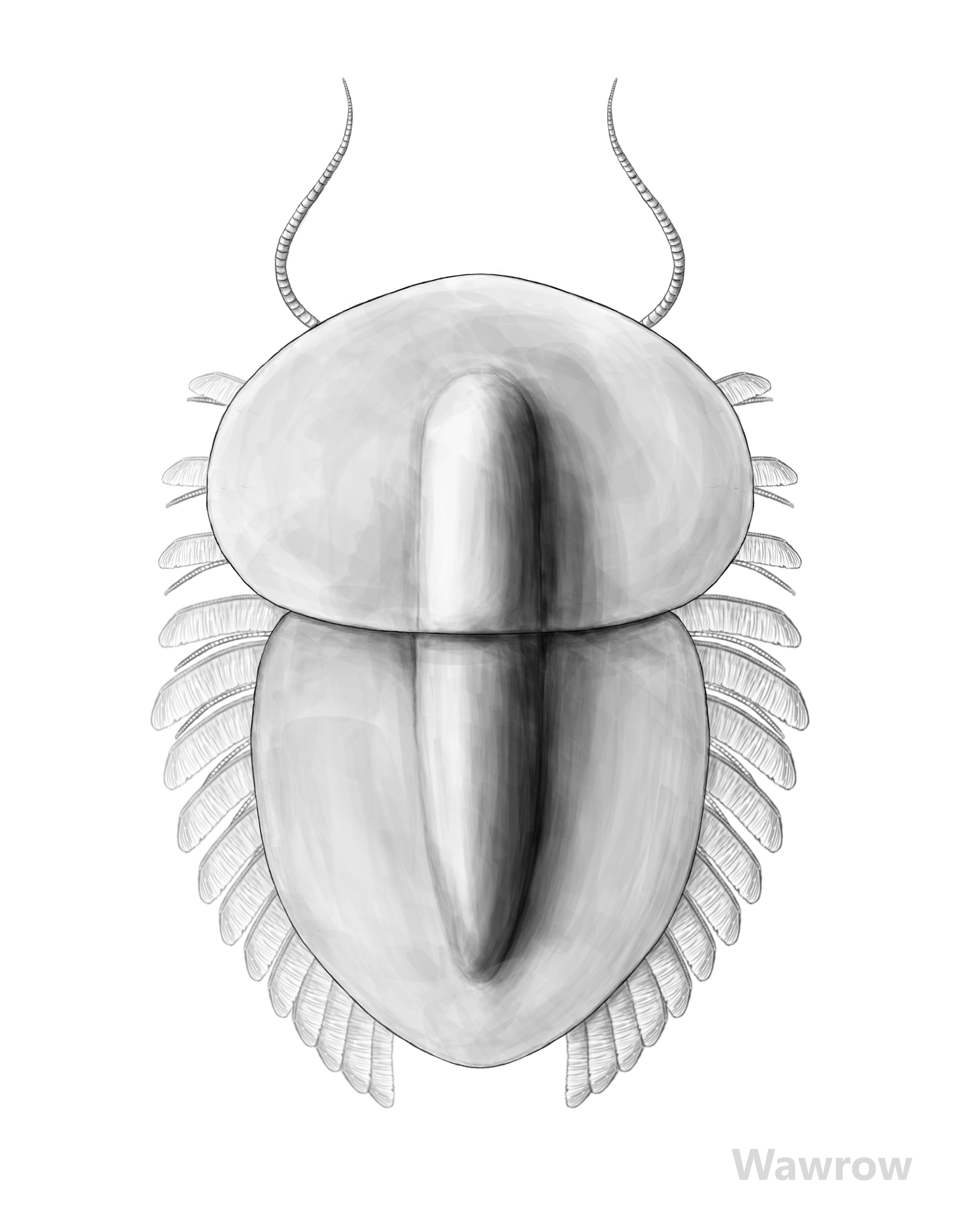
Naraoia magna reconstruction

Naraoia is almost flat (dorso-ventrally). The upper (or dorsal) side of the body consists of a non-calcified transversely oval or semi-circular headshield (cephalon), and a tailshield (pygidium) longer than the cephalon, without any body segments in between. The body is narrowed at the articulation between cephalon and pygidium. The long many-segmented antennas are directed sideways. There are no eyes. The gut has a relatively large diameter (14–18% of the width of the body), and next to four pairs of large digestive sacs (or caeca). The cephalon has branched diverticula occupying most of the cephalon (unlike in Misszhouia). Naraoia had appendages with two branches on a common basis, like Misszhouia and trilobites. At least the anterior trunk limbs have exopods with large, paddle-shaped distal lobes and short flattened side branches (setae) on the shaft. The endopod (known only in N. compacta) is composed of six podomeres.

== Distribution ==
Species of Naraoia are known from Canada, the United States, South China, and Australia, occurring in deposits ranging from the Lower Cambrian (Atdabanian) to the late Upper Silurian (Pridoli).

== Ecology ==
Sediments present in the gut of Naraoia suggest that it may have been a deposit feeder, eating large amounts of soil, like an earthworm. A very large, complex system of gut diverticula and a gut with great holding capacity indicate that the diet of Naraoia spinosa was low in nutrition. On the other hand, the morphology of the digestive system has also been interpreted as representing a predatory habit. The large, paddle-shaped distal lobes and short lamellar setae on the exopods, the implanting of the antennas to the side, and the angle of the cephalon with the pygidium of up to 90° with which many specimen are found, all agree with a life of burrowing.

== Habitat ==
All naraoiids were probably marine bottom dwellers.

== Key to the species ==
1	Pygidium less than 1 1/2× as long (along the axis) as the cephalon; If the digestive system is visual, gut more than 1/8 of the width of the body, with branched diverticula filling most of the cephalon; Antennas implanted laterally. → 2
-	Pygidium more than 1 3/4× as long as the cephalon; If the digestive system is visual, gut less than 1/8 of the width of the body, with four pairs of small bifurcating sacs of equal size reaching at most 1/3 of the width of the cephalon; Antennas implanted anteriorly. 25 pairs of biramous legs. Up to 6 cm in length. → Misszhouia longicaudata (Zhang & Hou 1985), jr. syn. Naraoia longicaudata
2	Pygidium with more or less prominent spines; cephalon at least 1 1/3× as wide as long, with genal spines. → 3
-	Pygidium without spines, termination rounded or slightly pointed; cephalon at most 1 1/4× as wide as long, genal spines present or not. → 4
3	Dominant spines are located at or slightly in front of the widest point of the pygidium and at the termination. ±17 pairs of biramous legs. Up to 4 cm in length. Known from the Middle Cambrian Burgess Shale, Stephen Formation, British Columbia, Canada. → Naraoia spinifer Walcott 1931
-	Dominant spines are located at the pygidial angle, the posterior border slightly concave. ±19 pairs of biramous legs. Up to 4 1/2 cm in length. Known from the Lower Cambrian Chengjiang biota of China. → Naraoia spinosa Zhang & Hou 1985
4	Doublure in the cephalon narrow; Pygidium with rounded termination. → 5
-	Anterior doublure broad, almost 1/4× the length of the cephalon at midline; Pygidium terminates slightly pointed. Known from the late Upper Silurian (Pridolian) Williamsville Member of the Bertie Formation of Southern Ontario, Canada. → Naraoia bertiensis Caron, Rudkin & Milliken 2004
5	Genal angle rounded, spines absent. Known from the Balang Formation, near Geyi, Taijiang County, Guizhou, China. → Naraoia taijiangensis Peng, Zhao & Sun 2012
-	Genal angle blunt, spines may be present. 19 pairs of biramous legs. Up to 4 cm in length. Know from the Middle Cambrian Burgess Shale, the Early to Middle Cambrian of Idaho and Utah, and from the Early Cambrian Emu Bay Shale in Australia. → Naraoia compacta Walcott 1912, jr. syn. N. halia, N. pammon

== See also ==
- Paleobiota of the Burgess Shale
