= Emu Bay Shale =

Geological formation in South Australia

- Stratigraphic range: Cambrian Series 2 (Cambrian Stage 4) ~514–512 Ma
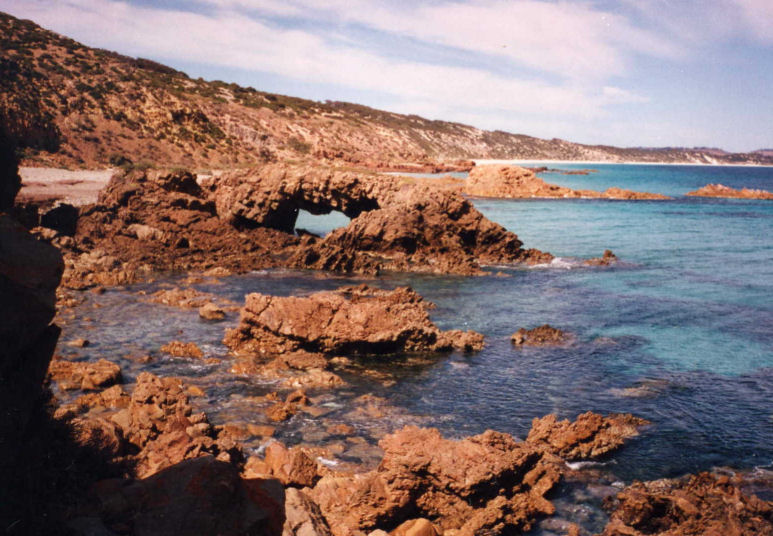
- North Coast of Kangaroo Island, Emu Bay
- Type: Geological formation
- Unit of: Kangaroo Island Group
- Underlies: Boxing Bay Formation
- Overlies: Marsden Sandstone (unconformity)
- Thickness: 78 m (256 ft), of which the lowest 10 m are fossiliferous

Lithology
- Primary: Shale
- Other: Sandstone

Location
- Coordinates: 35°35′S 137°30′E
- Region: The north coast of Kangaroo Island, around Emu Bay and Cape D'Estaing, South Australia
- Country: Australia

Type section
- Named for: Emu Bay
- Emu Bay Shale (Australia) Emu Bay Shale (South Australia)

The Emu Bay Shale (EBS) is a geological formation in Emu Bay, South Australia, noted for its exceptional preservation of soft-bodied fossils, and is Australia's only known Cambrian Konservat-Lagerstätte. The Emu Bay Shale is dated to early Cambrian Stage 4, approximately ~514 to 512 Ma (Pararaia janeae zone) and correlated with the upper Botomian Stage of the Lower Cambrian. The EBS has a thickness of 78 metres (256 ft). The formation underlies the Boxing Bay Formation, and overlies the Marsden Sandstone.

More than 50 species of invertebrates including redlichiidans, non-biomineralized arthropods (including megacheirans, nektaspids, and hymenocarines), radiodonts, palaeoscolecids, a lobopodian, a polychaete, vetulicolians, nectocaridids, hyoliths, brachiopods, sponges, chancelloriids, several problematica and a chelicerate are known from the Emu Bay Shale.

== Age & Geology ==
The lower Cambrian (Series 2) Emu Bay Shale is a formation of the Kangaroo Island Group, a stratigraphic group which is limited in range to the north coast of Kangaroo Island. When the sediments of the EBS and adjacent strata were laid, the landmass that is now South Australia was located on the palaeoequator in what has been referred to as the 'tropical carbonate development zone', and was a constituent piece along the margin of East Gondwana. The EBS has been biocorrelated to the lower Cambrian (Stage 4 of Series 2) Pararaia janeae trilobite Zone of the mainland, based on the occurrence of the trilobites Balcoracania dailyi, Estaingia bilobata and Redlichia takooensis. This is equivalent to both the middle–upper Botoman of Siberia, and to the Canglangpuan Stage of South China. According to the 2012 Geologic Time Scale, the age of the EBS is about 514 ± 1 million years ago, and is temporally contemporaneous with the Balang and Guanshan biotas of China, but younger than the Chengjiang and Sirius Passet Lagerstätten. A later 2023 study suggested that the Emu Bay Shale dated to around 512 million years ago instead, based on a correlation to a radiometric date of 511.87 ± 0.14 Ma in the contemporaneous Billy Creek Formation.

== Palaeoenvironment ==
In a geological sense, Kangaroo Island is the southwesterly continuation of the Mt. Lofty Ranges. Along with the Flinders Ranges and Olary Arc, these are only a fraction of the Early Palaeozoic mountain folt belt known as the Delamerides.The mountain building associated with the Delamerides was resumed in the late Cenozoic, forming the current ranges of eastern South Australia. The Kangaroo Island Group, to which the EBS is a unit of, is only present in the northeastern coast of the island, and is thought to represent deposition near the modern northern boundary of an ancient rift basin, possessing in its margin alluvial fans. Rifting recorded in the strata is associated with the occurrence of deformation, which is linked to the Delamerian Orogeny, as well as wider deformation across most of the western margin of Antarctica and Australia. Thus, the deposits are considered to represent the prodelta of a fan delta located within a rift basin.

Although the EBS hosts a biota which is similar too those of other Cambrian Burgess Shale-type faunas, the aforementioned depositional setting and preservation style differs from the modern understanding of regular Burgess Shale-type and their typical taphonomy. This has even lead to Robert R. Gaines excluding the EBS from the global list of over 50 Burgess Shale-type deposits, awaiting further study.

== Notable discoveries ==
In the EBS, phosphatized organic material of Isoxys and Myoscolex, and fossilized eyes have been documented, with a higher quality of preservation than other non-biomineralized eyes that are found in the Burgess Shale and Chengjiang strata. These eyes range from having more than 3,000 to at least 16,000 ommatidial lenses, the latter of which have been assigned to Anomalocaris.

In 2011, paired compound eyes 2–3 centimetres (0.79–1.18 in) long were described from the Emu Bay Shale and assigned to Anomalocaris. Some of these eyes preserve at least 16,000 hexagonally arranged lenses, comparable to the most acute compound eyes of living arthropods.

== Paleobiota ==
The Emu Bay Shale yields a rich assemblage of fauna, including Estaingia, Redlichia, two species of the nektaspid arthropod family Emucarididae, Emucaris fava and Kangacaris zhangi, the scleritome-bearing Chancelloria, Anomalocaris, Echidnacaris, Isoxys, Tuzoia, Oestokerkus, a genus of leanchoiliid closely related to the well-known Leanchoilia, the early chelicerate Wisangocaris and the artiopodan arthropod Australimicola. An armoured lobopodian of the Family Luolishaniidae is known from a single specimen that closely resembles the species Collinsovermis monstruosus from the Burgess Shale. Also known are the palaeoscolecid worm Wronascolex, the problematic Myoscolex, "petalloids", Vetustovermis, and a number of rarer elements. The EBS trilobites rarely preserve any trace of non-biomineralized tissue; a small number of specimens of Redlichia have been reported with antennae.

=== Non-artiopod arthropods ===
Non-artiopod arthropods of the Emu Bay Shale
Genus	Species	Notes	Images
Anomalocaris	A. daleyae	Radiodonta, Anomalocarididae	Frontal appendage of A. daleyae.
Echidnacaris	E. briggsi	Radiodonta, Tamisiocarididae	Echidnacaris reconstruction.
Isoxys	I. communis	Isoxyida, Isoxyidae	Life restoration of the related Isoxys curvirostratus.
Isoxys	I. glaessneri	Isoxyida, Isoxyidae	Life restoration of the related Isoxys curvirostratus.
Oestokerkus	O. megacholix	Leanchoilida, Leanchoiliidae	O. megacholix reconstruction.
Parapaleomerus	?P. sp.		
Tanglangia	T. rangatanga	Megacheira, incertae sedis	A reconstruction of the closely related T. longicaudata.
Tuzoia	T. australis	Hymenocarina, Tuzoiidae	Restoration of the related species T. burgessensis.
Tuzoia	T. sp.	Hymenocarina, Tuzoiidae	Restoration of the related species T. burgessensis.
Wisangocaris	W. barbarahardyae	Habeliida, Sanctacarididae	Wisangocaris life restoration.
Canadaspidida indet.	sp. indet.	Hymenocarina, incertae sedis	

=== Artiopods ===
Artiopods of the Emu Bay Shale
Genus	Species	Notes	Images
Australimicola	A. spriggi	Protosutura incertae sedis	Reconstruction of Australimicola.
Balcoracania	B. dailyi	Redlichiida, Emuellidae	B. dailyi fossil.
Emucaris	E. fava	Nektaspida, Emucarididae	
Emuella	E. polymera	Redlichiida, Emuellidae	E. polymera fossil.
Eozetetes	E. gemmelli	Vicissicaudata incertae sedis	
Estaingia	E. bilobata	Ptychopariida, Estaingiidae	E. bilobata fossil.
Holyoakia	H. simpsoni	Corynexochida, Dorypygidae	H. simpsoni fossil.
Kangacaris	K. zhangi	Nektaspida, Emucarididae	Kangacaris (left) and Emucaris (right)
Megapharanaspis	M. nedini	Redlichiida, Megapharanaspidae	
Squamacula	S. buckorum	incertae sedis	A drawing of the closely related S. clypeata.
Redlichia	R. takooensis	Redlichiida, Redlichiidae	R. takooensis fossil
Redlichia	R. rex	Redlichiida, Redlichiidae	R. takooensis fossil
Xandarellida indet.	sp. indet.	Xandarellida, incertae sedis	

=== Non-arthropods ===
Non-arthropods of the Emu Bay Shale
Genus	Species	Notes	Images
Chancelloria	C. australilonga	Chancelloriida, Chancelloriidae	
Myoscolex	M. ateles	Animalia, incertae sedis	M. ateles fossil.
Nesonektris	N. aldridgei	Vetulicolida, incertae sedis	N. aldridgei reconstruction.
Vetustovermis	V. planus	Chaetognatha, Nectocarididae	Life restoration of Nectocaris, of which Vetustovermis has been suggested to be a synonym.
Wronascolex	W. antiquus (Formerly Palaeoscolex antiquus)	Palaeoscolecidae, incertae sedis	
Wronascolex	W. iacoborum	Palaeoscolecidae, incertae sedis	
Brachiopoda indet.	spp. indet.	Brachiopoda, incertae sedis	
Choiidae indet.	sp. indet.	Protomonaxonida, Choiidae	
Demospongiae indet.	spp. indet.	Demospongiae, incertae sedis	
Hamptoniidae indet.	sp.indet.	Porifera, Hamptoniidae	
Hyolitha indet.	spp. indet.	Hyolitha, incertae sedis	
Leptomitidae indet.	sp. indet.	Porifera, Leptomitidae	
Luolishaniidae indet.	sp. indet.	Lobopodia, Luolishaniidae	Life restoration of Collinsovermis, which closely resembles the Emu Bay Shale luolishaniid
"Petalloid" indet.	sp. indet.	incertae sedis	
Polychaeta indet.	sp. indet.	Polychaeta, ?Burgessochaetidae	
Priapulida indet.	sp. indet.	Priapulida, incertae sedis	
Rotadiscidae indet.	sp. indet.	Rotadiscidae	

== See also ==
- Lagerstätte—other fossil localities
- List of fossil sites (with link directory)
