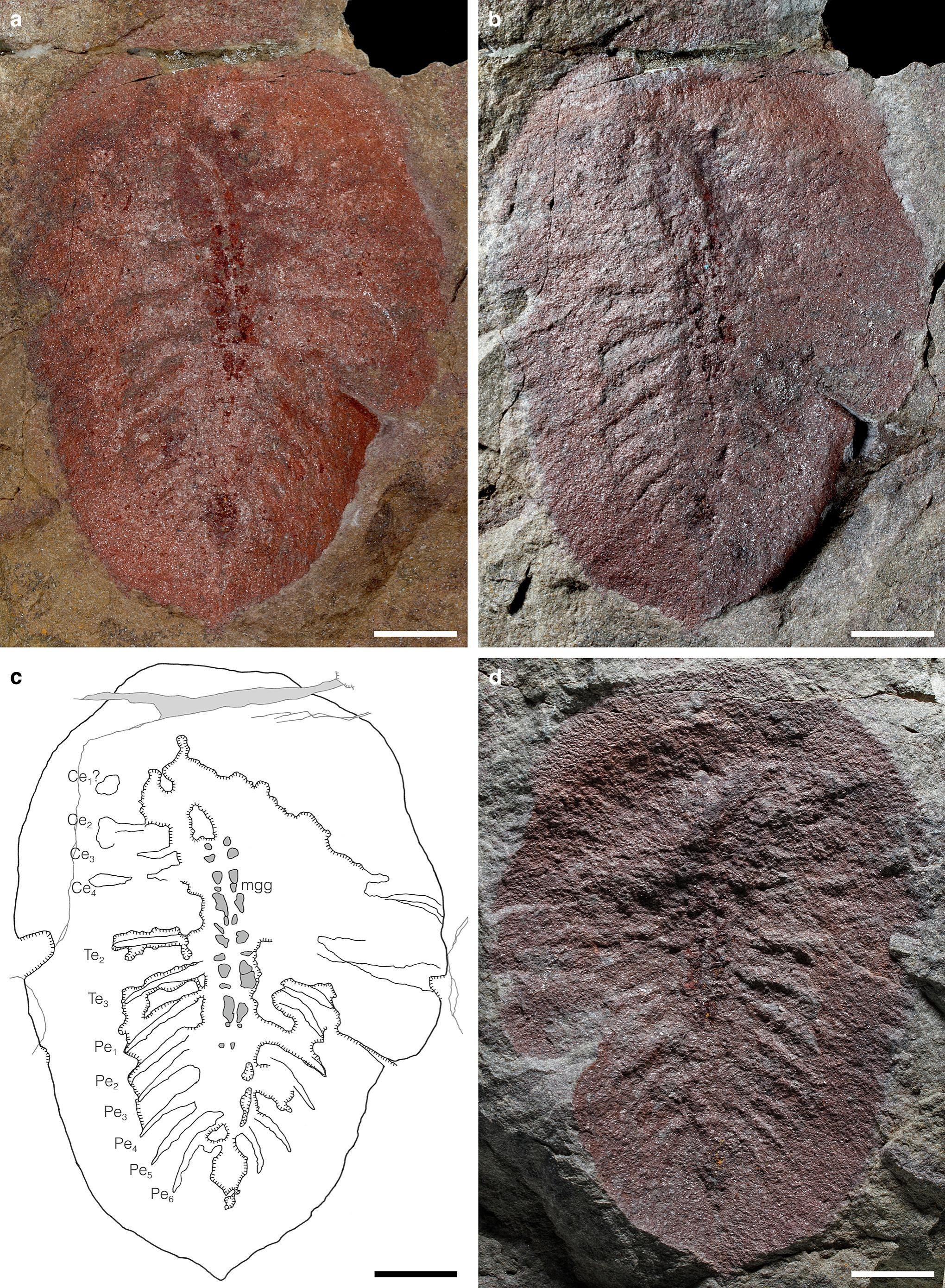
- Holotype of Tafilocaris ordovicica

Scientific classification
- Kingdom: Animalia
- Phylum: Arthropoda
- Clade: †Artiopoda
- Order: †Nektaspida
- Family: †Emucarididae
- Genus: †Tafilocaris; García-Bellido & Gutiérrez-Marco, 2025
- Species: †T. ordovicica

Binomial name
- †Tafilocaris ordovicica García-Bellido & Gutiérrez-Marco, 2025

= Tafilocaris =

Tafilocaris Temporal range: Upper Ordovician (Sandbian) 455 Ma

Extinct genus of nektaspid

Tafilocaris (Tafilalt shrimp) is an extinct genus of emucaridid nektapsid arthropod known from the Upper Ordovician (Sandbian) Tafilalt biota of Morocco. It is the largest known nektaspid and the youngest known emucaridid, being 57 million years younger than the previous youngest emucaridids.

== Etymology ==
The generic name Tafilocaris is derived from the name of the Tafilalt biota from which it is from, along with the suffix -caris, which means "shrimp" in Latin and is commonly used as a suffix for the names of Palaeozoic arthropods (e.g. Anomalocaris).

The specific name ordovicica refers to the fact that this emucaridid lived in the Late Ordovician period and was chosen to "emphasize the longevity of the family, so far only known from the Cambrian."

== Description ==
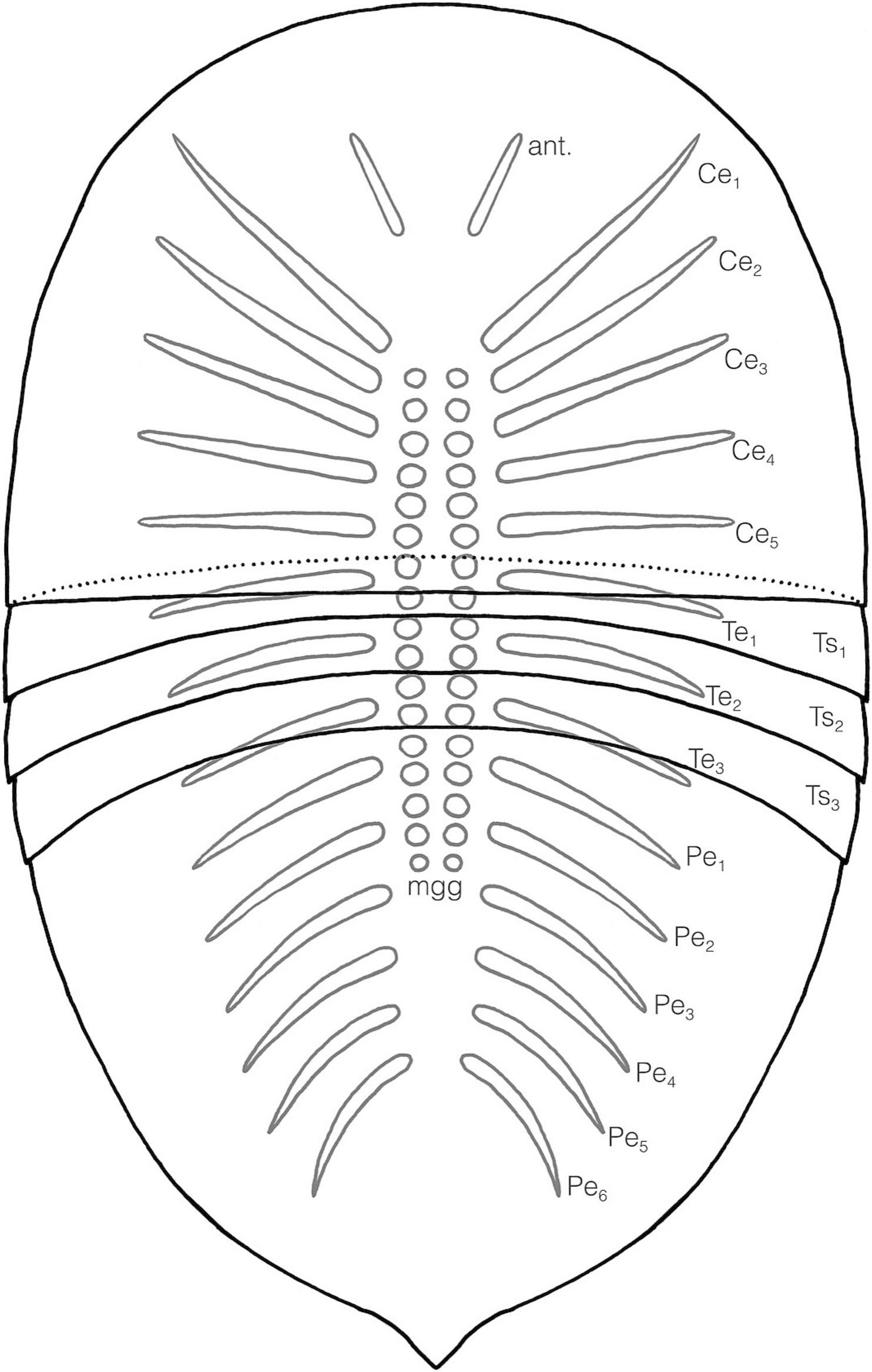
Reconstruction of Tafilocaris ordovicica in top-down view with internal and underside structures (midgut glands, antennae and endopod legs, respectively) in light grey. Abbreviations: ant: antenna; Cen: Cephalic endopods; mgg: midgut glands; Pen: Pygidial endopods; Ten: Thoracic endopods; Tsn: Thoracic segments.

Tafilocaris is a large genus of emucaridid (being double the length of the previous largest nektaspids Misszhouia canadensis and Naraoia magna and 5 to 25 times the length of its fellow emucaridids), with the holotype specimen MGM-7201X reaching 15.1 centimetres (5.9 in) in length and the paratype MGM-7755X reaching an even larger 15.75 cm (6.20 in) in length. The maximum width of Tafilocaris's weakly-biomineralized exoskeleton is around 67-68% of the animal's length (10.3 cm (4.1 in) in the holotype and 10.6 cm (4.2 in) in the paratype). The exoskeleton of Tafilocaris is composed of a cephalon, three thoracic segments, and a terminal pygidium. The lengths of the cephalon, thorax, and pygidium can only be measured for the paratype; however, the overall proportions of both the holotype and paratype are extremely similar.

The cephalon is 6.8 cm (2.7 in) long (43% of the total body length) and 10.3 cm (4.1 in) wide in the paratype, with a round anterior margin that lacks a doublure. In life, it likely would have overlapped between half and two-thirds of the first thoracic segment. Unlike other emucaridids, Tafilocaris does not preserve a hypostome (a hard plate found on the ventral side of the cephalon used to process food). The thoracic segments are recurved and widen distally, reaching a maximum sagittal length of between 8 and 9 mm (0.31 and 0.35 in) The pygidium of the paratype is 7.4 cm (2.9 in) (47% of the animal's total length) and 9.85 cm (3.88 in) wide, and has a generally triangular shape. The anterior margin of the pygidium is convex, and the posterior margin of the pygidium is round and gently curves to a pointed tip.

Tafilocaris had fifteen pairs of appendages: a pair of antennae, and 14 pairs of biramous (two branched) appendages: five pairs of postantennal cephalic appendages, three pairs of thoracic appendages, with one pair of appendages per segment, and six pairs of pygidial appendages. The antennae are not completely preserved but they seem to be short and around 2 mm wide. The endopods (lower, leg-like limb branches) of the biramous appendages generally grow shorter and thinner posteriorly; the first and second postantennal cephalic appendages are 4 cm (1.6 in) long and 3.05 cm (1.20 in) long respectively and 3.5 mm and 4.0 mm wide respectively, while the fifth and sixth pygidial appendages are 1.9 cm (0.75 in) long and 2.5 and 2.0 mm wide, respectively. The exopods (upper limb branches) are not preserved.

Both the holotype and paratype of Tafilocaris preserve paired digestive glands. The glands are circular or oval in shape and between 2.5 and 4 mm (3/32 and 5/32 in) in length. They start at the second cephalic appendage and extend to the second or third pygidial appendages.

== Paleoecology ==
Both specimens of Tafilocaris ordovicica was found at the Bou Nemrou site of the Sandbian Izegguirene Formation along with a diverse fauna of trilobites (11 species, including illaenids, lichids, odontopleurids, dalmanitids, pliomerids, asaphids, cyclopygids, and harpetids), other non-trilobite arthropods (including the cheloniellids Duslia and Triopus, an aglaspidid, and a possible carcinosomatid eurypterid and xiphosuran known from fragmentary material), and echinoderms (14 genera, including eocrinoids, ophiuroids, stylophorans, crinoids, edrioasteroids, and a cyclocystoid), as well as the palaeoscolecid Gamascolex, the eldonioid Discophyllum peltatum, and rare brachiopods and graptolites.

The Tafilalt biota, which includes Bou Nemrou, is an extremely shallow-water, high-energy environment with abundant microbial mats. This likely led to the unique preservation style of soft-bodied organisms from the biota, which is remarkably similar to Ediacara-style preservation.

== Distribution and implications ==
Tafilocaris is the youngest known emucaridid, being found in the Sandbian Izegguirene Formation. This makes it around 57 million years younger than the previous youngest emucaridids, Emucaris fava and Kangacaris zhangi. This confirms the presence of a ghost lineage of nektaspids as preserved by Bond & Edgecombe, 2021.

In addition, its presence in the polar waters of then-Western Gondwana in contrast to the tropical waters of Eastern Gondwana and South China suggests that emucaridids were found throughout Gondwanan oceans rather than being restricted to tropical waters.

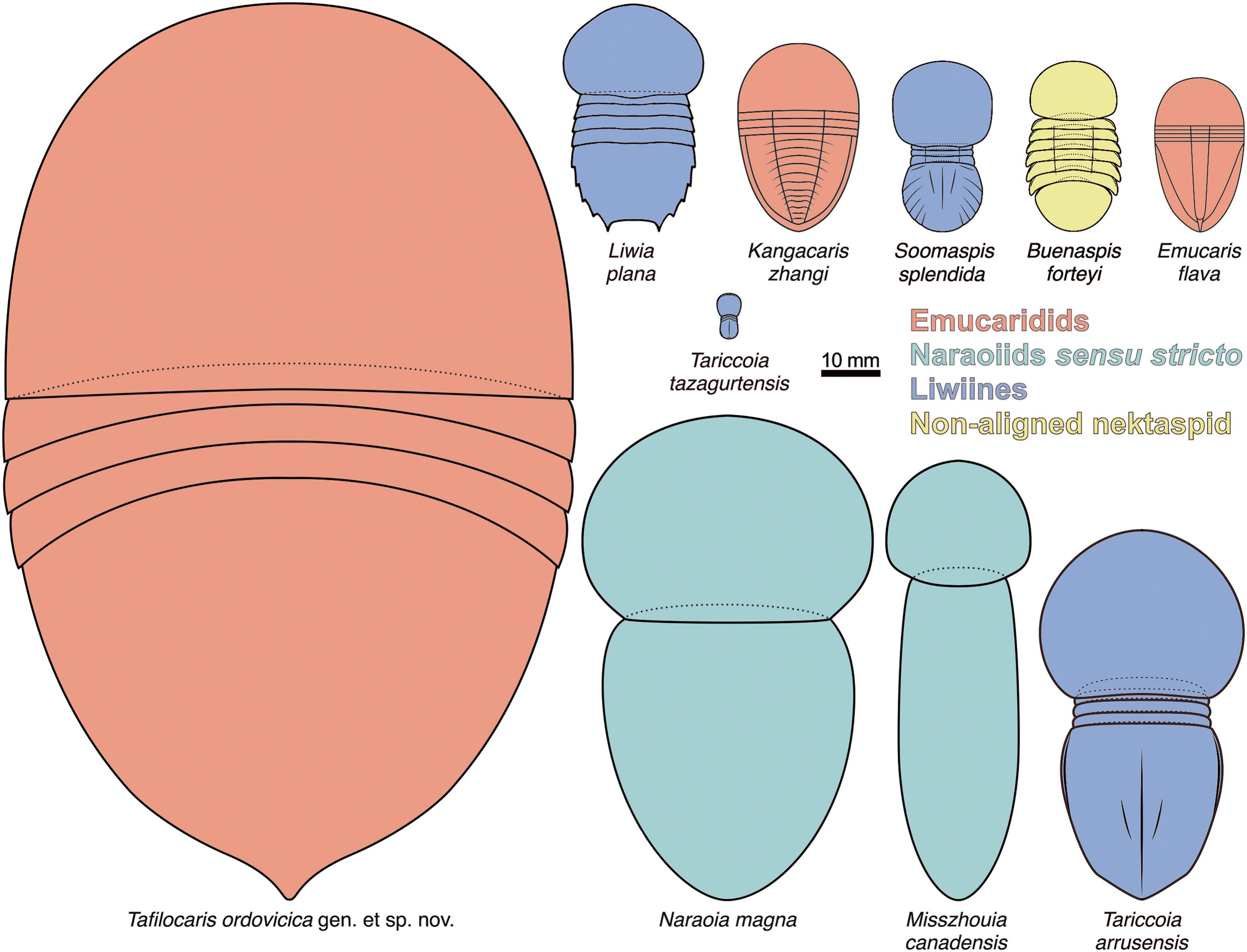
Size comparison of Tafilocaris ordovicica with the largest nektaspids known to date, plus the other emucaridid, liwiine and non-aligned Cambro-Ordovician genera.
