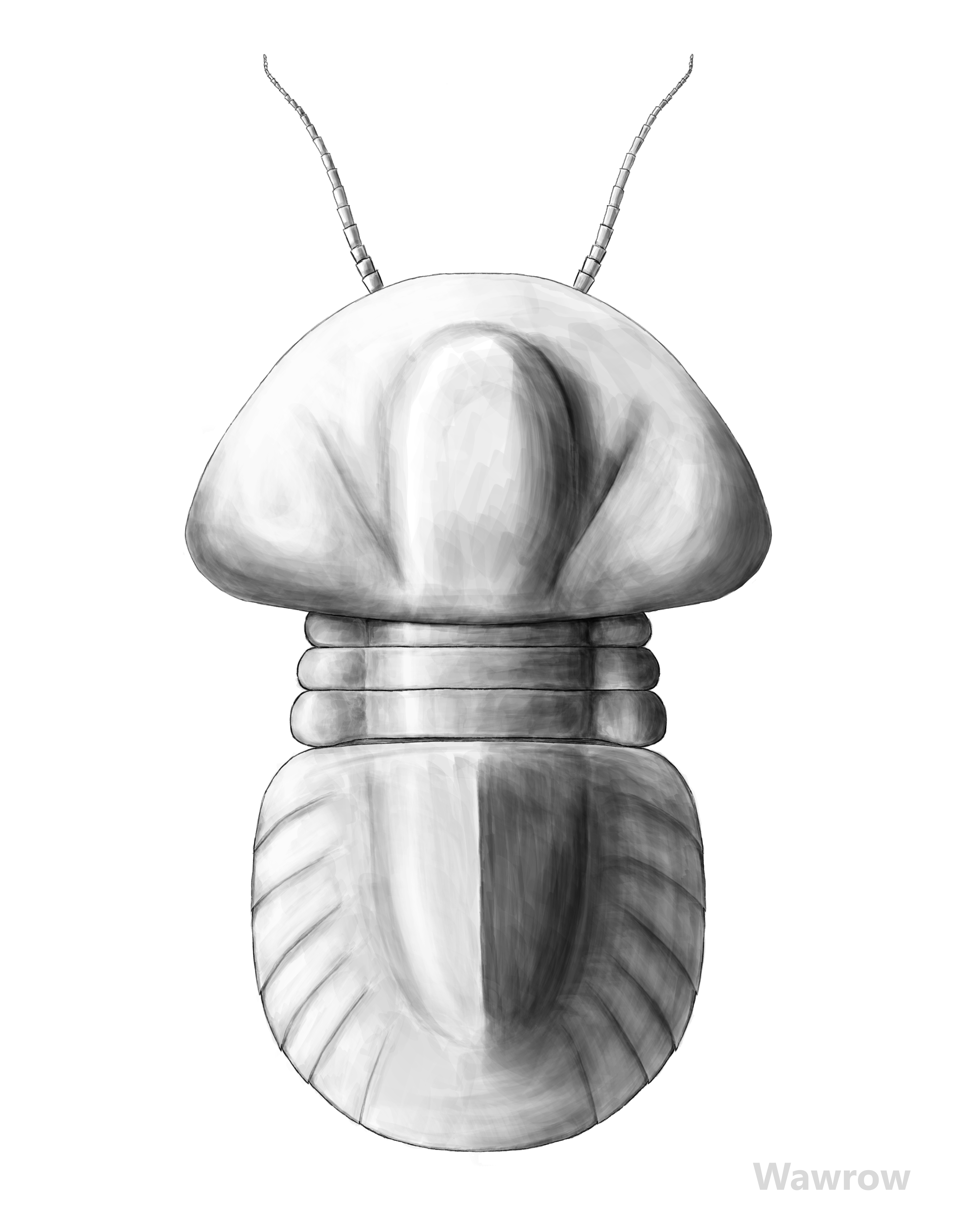
- Reconstruction of Soomaspis splendida

Scientific classification
- Kingdom: Animalia
- Phylum: Arthropoda
- Clade: †Artiopoda
- Order: †Nektaspida
- Family: †Liwiidae
- Genus: †Soomaspis; Fortey & Theron, 1994

Species
- Soomaspis splendida Fortey & Theron, 1994; Soomaspis labutai Lukáš et al., 2026

= Soomaspis =

Soomaspis Temporal range: late Katian - early Hirnantian

Marine arthropods that lived during the late Ordovician

Soomaspis is a genus of small to average size (about 3 cm or 1.2-inch long) marine arthropods in the family Liwiidae, that lived during the late Ordovician (early Hirnantian). Fossil remains of Soomaspis were collected from the Soom Shale Lagerstätte in Western Cape, South Africa and also found during excavations of a metro line in Prague, Czech Republic. Soomaspis looks like a large, soft agnostid trilobite. It has a headshield (or cephalon) wider than the tailshield (pygidium), and in between them three thoracic body segments (somites). The known species in this genus currently include Soomaspis splendida and Soomaspis labutai.

== Etymology ==
The name of the genus is a compound word of the deposit where the species was collected (the Soom Shale), and the Greek word "aspis" (shield). The species epithet, splendida comes from the Latin word "splendere" (brightness). The species name labutai derives from its discoverer Radek Labuťa.

== Description ==
Soomaspis splendida is estimated to be over 3 cm (1.2 inches) along the axis, 1 1/2 times longer than wide. The dorsal exoskeleton consists of a cephalon, a pygidium and two or three thoracic somites with articulating half-rings, all non-calcified, supposedly of medium convexity. The axis is poorly defined. The cephalon is transversely oval, widest at midlength. The cephalon is wider than the pygidium. Eyes are absent. Antennas are not known. The body is constricted at the three thoracic somites, so the animal gives the impression to have a waist. The pygidium is slightly wider than long, with the greatest width at midlength. The pygidium has a mid-ridge and five segments divided by clear furrows on the outer parts of the pleural field. The back edge of these furrows curve backwards, ending at a sharp angle to the pygidial margin.

The holotype of Soomaspis labutai measures about 2.2 cm. Compared to S. splendida it has shorter pygidium, narrower cephalon, larger and fewer pits on the pygidium and pits on cephalic doublure.

=== Differences with other Liwiidae ===
- Soomaspis splendida differs from Liwia by having 3 thoracic somites instead of 4. S. splendida has a mid-length ridge on the pygidium and furrows on the outer parts of the pleural field, which are unknown from Liwia. Soomaspis also has a pygidium with an entire margin, while Liwia has five pairs of modest marginal spines, and a concave posterior border.
- S. splendida differs from Buenaspis forteyi, that has a cephalon and pygidium that are not wider than its 6 thoracic somites. The pygidium of B. forteyi is wider than long, with a straight anterior border. Buenaspis and Soomaspis have an entire margin and a mid-ridge on the pygidium in common.
- S. splendida differs from Tariccoia arrusensis, that lacks visible segmentation of the pygidium. The surface of the exoskeleton of S. splendida, particularly the pygidium, shows dense pitting, while it is smooth in T. arrusensis. Tariccoia and Soomaspis both have a broad doublure and lack a lengthwise mid-ridge on the cephalon. In both species the pygidium is about as long as wide, but in Soomaspis the widest point is around midlength, while Tariccoia is widest in the frontal half. The species share 3 thoracic somites, an entire margin and a mid-ridge on the pygidium.

== Distribution ==
Soomaspis splendida has been collected from the Soom Shale (early Hirnantian), Keurbos Farm, near Clanwilliam, Cape Province, South Africa.. The older S. labutai is known from Katian Králův Dvůr Formation of the Prague Basin, Czech Republic.

== Habitat ==
Soomaspis splendida was probably a marine bottom dweller. The Soom Shale is sometimes interfingered with the glacial tillite of the Pakhuis Formation, indicating that S. splendida lived in the open sea, near the edge of an ice sheet. S. labutai is presumed to have lived in deep-water, open-shelf setting.
