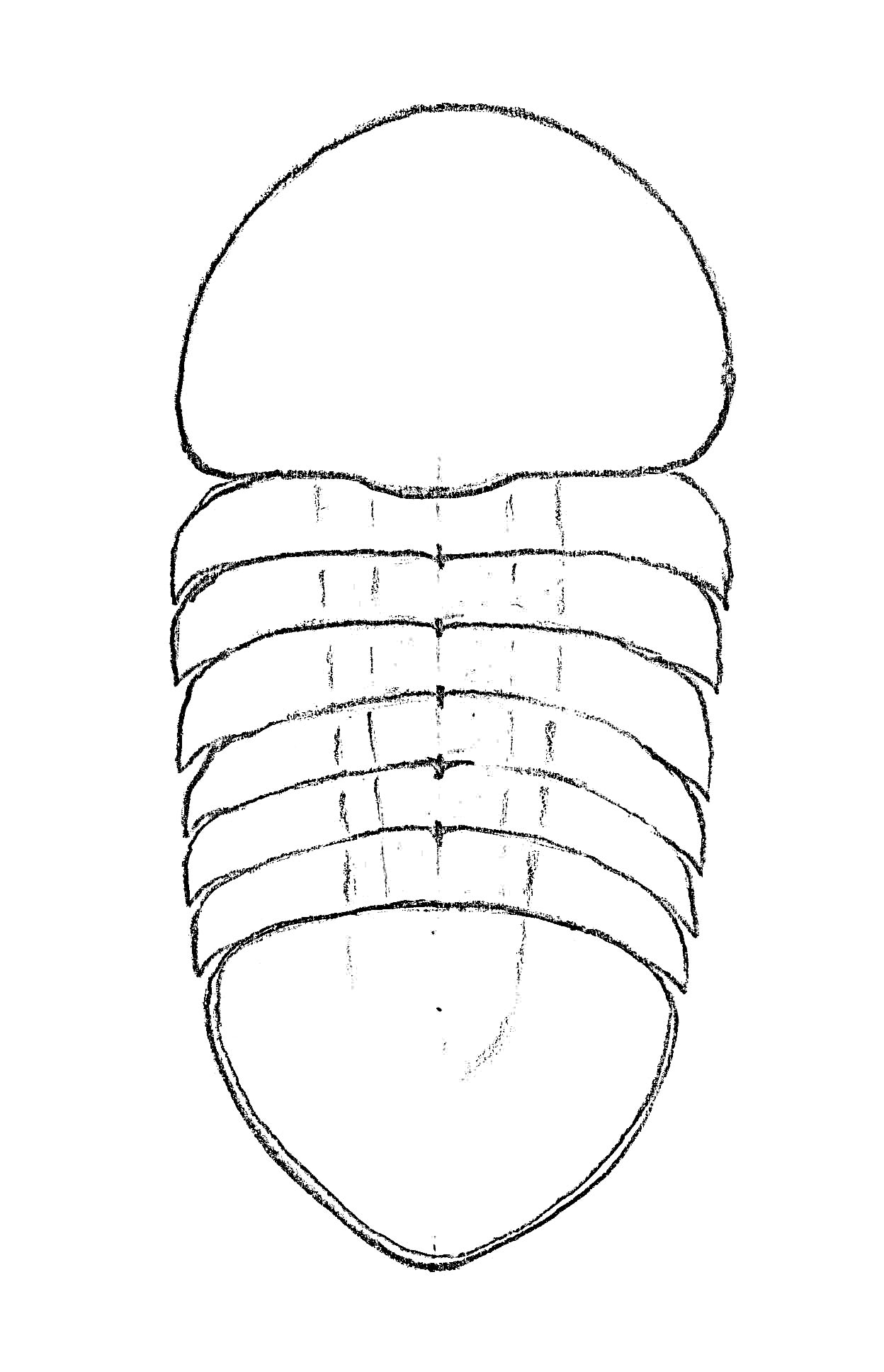

Scientific classification
- Kingdom: Animalia
- Phylum: Arthropoda
- Clade: †Artiopoda
- Order: †Nektaspida
- Genus: †Buenaspis; Budd, 1999
- Species: †B. forteyi

Binomial name
- †Buenaspis forteyi Budd, 1999

= Buenaspis =

Buenaspis forteyi Temporal range: Atdabanian

Small Cambrian arthropod

Buenaspis is a genus of small ( 1 to 3 centimetres (0.39 to 1.18 in) long) nektaspid arthropod, that lived during the early Cambrian period. Fossil remains of Buenaspis were collected from the Lower Cambrian Sirius Passet Lagerstätte of North Greenland. Buenaspis looks like a soft eyeless trilobite. It has a headshield (or cephalon) slightly larger than the tailshield (pygidium), and in between them six thoracic body segments (somites). The genus is monotypic, its sole species being Buenaspis forteyi.

== Etymology ==
The name of the genus is derived from the Buen Formation, the deposit where the species was collected, and the Greek word aspis (shield). The species was named in honor of Richard Fortey, a famed paleontologist.

== Description ==
Buenaspis forteyi is between 1 and 3 cm along the axis, approximately half a wide as long, in general outline shaped as a bar with parallel sides and rounded front and back ends. It is likely the animal was distinctly convex, considering the many concentric crush-marks found in many specimens. The dorsal exoskeleton consists of a cephalon, a pygidium and six thoracic somites with articulating half-rings, all non-calcified. The cephalon is sub-semicircular, broader than it is long, and with rounded genal angles. Eyes are absent. Antennas are not known. The six thoracic somites are extended into broad posteriorly directed pleural spines, which are free at their tips. The caudal shield is slightly smaller than the cephalic shield, and somewhat more rounded. Some specimens appear to have a lengthwise mid-ridge from the cephalon to the pygidium. Although Budd attributes this feature to deformations, since it does not occur in all specimens known, later authors seem to have accepted it as authentic.

=== Differences from Liwiidae ===
- Buenaspis forteyi differs from Liwia by having six thoracic somites instead of four. B. forteyi also has an oval pygidium with an entire margin, while Liwia has five pairs of modest marginal pygidial spines, a straight anterior border and a concave posterior border.
- B. forteyi differs from Tariccoia arrusensis, that has a subcircular cephalon that is wider than the rest of its body, without a lengthwise mid-ridge, a broad doublure (about ¼× the cephalon length), three thoracic somites, and a pygidium that is longer than wide, with a straight anterior border. Buenaspis and Tariccoia have an entire margin in common.
- B. forteyi differs from Soomaspis splendida, that has an oval cephalon that is wider than the rest of its body, without a lengthwise mid-ridge, a broad doublure (about ¼× the cephalon length), three thoracic somites, and a pygidium that is about as long as wide. Buenaspis and Soomaspis have an entire margin in common.

== Distribution ==
B. forteyi has been collected from the Lower Cambrian (Atdabanian) Buen Formation, Sirius Passet Lagerstätte, Peary Land, North Greenland, on the south side of the broad valley known as Sirius Passet at its junction with J.P. Koch Fjord 82°47′6″N 42°13′7″W.

== Habitat ==
Buenaspis forteyi was probably a marine bottom dweller, that lived in deeper water. This may be deduced from the dominance of eyeless forms and the absence of seaweeds at the collection site.

== Taxonomy ==
The author that originally described Buenaspis and subsequent publications classified the genus as part of the family Liwiidae. Recently however, Paterson et al. propose to remove Buenaspis from the order Nektaspida entirely, on the argument that it lacks the 'waist' that is a common feature in Liwia, Soomaspis, Tariccoia, Misszhouia, Pseudonaraoia and Naraoia. Also, they regard the ridge on cephalon and pygidium in Buenaspis an artifact, unlike the ridge on the pygidium only in Soomaspis and Tariccoia. If Paterson et al. is followed, Buenaspis attains a position somewhere else in the Lamellipedia. Other authors have continued to consider Buenaspis a nektaspid, but have placed it outside Liwiidae or any other family.
