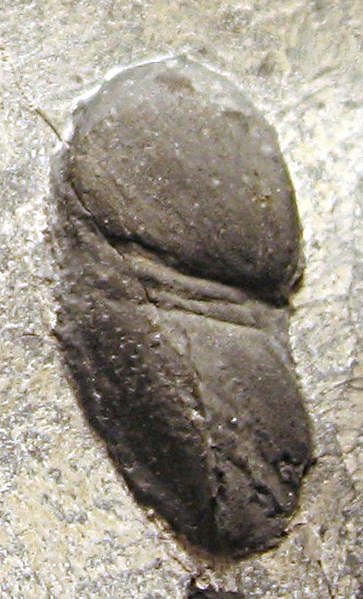
- Tariccoia arrusensis, 21 mm, from Sardegna, Italy

Scientific classification
- Kingdom: Animalia
- Phylum: Arthropoda
- Clade: †Artiopoda
- Order: †Nektaspida
- Family: †Liwiidae
- Genus: †Tariccoia; Hammann, 1990

Type species
- †Tariccoia arrusensis Hammann, 1990

Other species
- T. tazagurtensis

= Tariccoia =

Tariccoia arrusensis Temporal range: Ordovician

Extinct genus of arthropods

Tariccoia is a genus of nektaspid arthropods belonging to the family Liwiidae, known from fossils found in Ordovician strata in Sardinia and Morocco. It is between 2.5 centimetres (0.98 in) and 6 centimetres (2.4 in) long. It has a headshield (or cephalon) wider than the tailshield (pygidium), and in between them three (or four?) thoracic body segments (somites).

== Etymology ==
The name of the genus references the Sardinian paleontologist M. Taricco. The species was named after the Riu is Arrus Member, the deposit in which it was found.

== Description ==
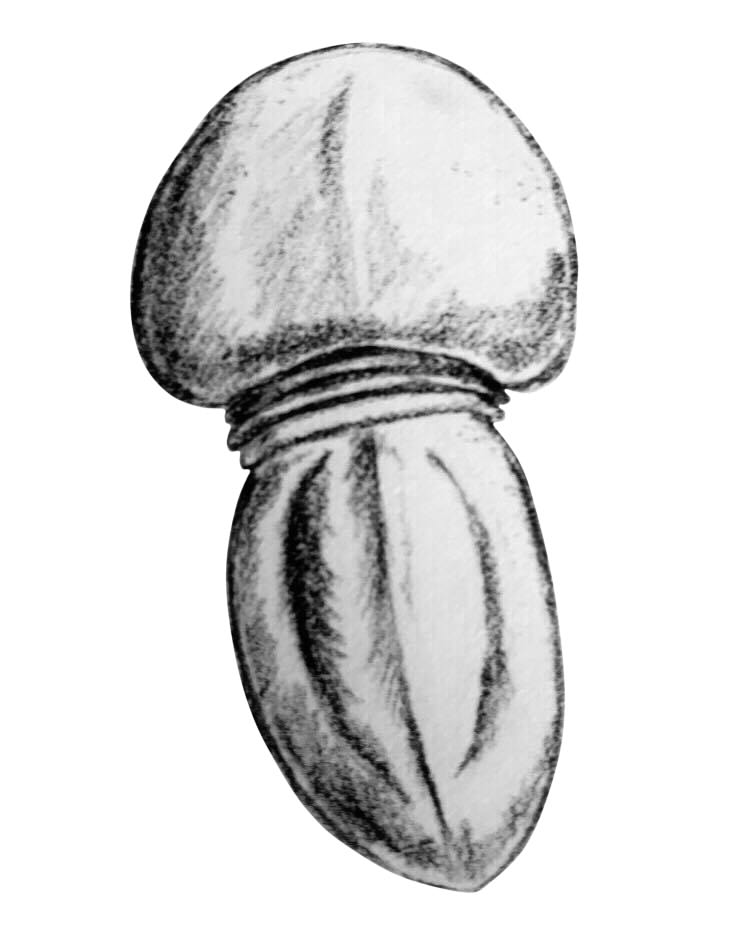
Drawing of Tariccoia arrusensis

Tariccoia arrusensis is between 2.5 and 6 cm along the axis, almost half a wide as long. The dorsal exoskeleton consists of a cephalon, a pygidium and two or three thoracic somites with articulating half-rings, all non-calcified. The cephalon is sub-semicircular, widest near the rounded genal angles. The cephalon is wider than the pygidium. Eyes are absent. Antennas are not known. The body is constricted at the two or three thoracic somites, so the animal gives the impression to have a waist. The pygidium is widest before midlength. The pygidium has a mid-ridge.

=== Differences with other Liwiidae ===
- Tariccoia arrusensis differs from Liwia by having 3 clearly visible thoracic somites (perhaps a 4th is obscured by the cephalon) instead of 4. T. arrusensis has a mid-length ridge on the pygidium, which is not known from Liwia. Tariccoia also has an oval pygidium with an entire margin, while Liwia has five pairs of modest marginal spines, a straight anterior border and a concave posterior border.
- T. arrusensis differs from Buenaspis forteyi, that has a cephalon and pygidium that are not wider than its 6 thoracic somites. The pygidium of B. forteyi is wider than long, with a straight anterior border. Buenaspis and Tariccoia have an entire margin and a mid-ridge on the pygidium in common.
- T. arrusensis differs from Soomaspis splendida, that has an oval cephalon, and lacks visible segmentation of the pygidium. Tariccoia and Soomaspis both have a broad doublure and lack a lengthwise mid-ridge on the cephalon. In both species the pygidium is about as long as wide, but in Soomaspis the widest point is around midlength, while Tariccoia is widest in the frontal half. The species share 3 thoracic somites, an entire margin and a mid-ridge on the pygidium.

== Distribution ==
T. arrusensis has been collected from the Upper Ordovician (Sandbian to Katian) Riu is Arrus Member, Monte Argentu Formation, Sardinia, Italy. T. tazagurtensis has been collected from the Fezouata Formation of Morocco dating to the Early Ordovician (Tremadocian).

== Habitat ==
Tariccoia arrusensis is thought to have lived in a restricted reduced oxygen marine environment close to shore such as a lagoon or a bay in what was then the cold high-latitude margin of southern Gondwana, where it was locally abundant alongside macroscopic algae. Tariccoia tazagurtensis also lived in cold waters in high-latitude southern Gondwana, but it was an extremely rare member of the fauna and lived in open shallow-marine conditions.
