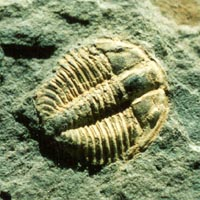
- Holyoakia simpsoni, © Dave Simpson

Scientific classification
- Domain: Eukaryota
- Kingdom: Animalia
- Phylum: Arthropoda
- Class: †Trilobita
- Order: †Corynexochida
- Family: †Dorypygidae
- Genus: †Holyoakia; Palmer in Palmer & Rowell, 1995

Species
- Holyoakia granulosa Palmer in Palmer & Rowell, 1995 (Type); Holyoakia simpsoni Paterson & Jago, 2006

= Holyoakia =

Holyoakia Temporal range: late Botomian ~518–516 Ma

Genus of trilobites

Holyoakia is a genus of very small (up to 7½ mm long) trilobites of the family Dorypygidae, from the late Lower Cambrian (Late Botonian) of South Australia and Antarctica.

== Etymology ==
Holyoakia simpsoni was named in honor of David Simpson from Adelaide, who collected the first specimens.

== Distribution ==
- Holyoakia granulosa has only been collected from the late Lower Cambrian of Antarctica (presumably Botomian, Shackleton Limestone, Central Transantarctic Mountains)
- Holyoakia simpsoni only occurs in the late Lower Cambrian of South Australia (mid-late Botomian, Emu Bay Shale, Big Gully, Kangaroo Island).

== Taxonomy ==
The genus was originally with reservation placed in the Emuellidae. The genus however lacks the specific characteristics of this family, most notably, the clearly furrowed glabella that is rounded at the frontal end, the hook-shaped eye ridges that run parallel to the margin of the head shield (or cephalon), clearly distinguishable prothorax of six segments, the most backward one with much larger spines than all others, and opistothorax of many segments, while the pygidium is tiny. Holyoakia however, has a rectangular glabella, difficult to discern eye ridges, a thorax of eight segments which is not differentiated and has no macropleural segment, and the pygidium is not much smaller than the cephalon.

== Ecology ==
Holyoakia simpsoni occurs together with Redlichia takooensis, Estaingia bilobata, Balcoracania dailyi, and Megapharanaspis nedini.

== Key to the species ==
1	Pygidium subtriangular, about 1½× as wide as long. Pygidial axis with 8 discernible rings. 6 pairs of pygidial pleura terminate in well developed spines. → Holyoakia granulosa
-	Pygidium transversely elliptical, more than 2× as wide as long. Pygidial axis with 5 discernible rings. 4 pairs of pygidial pleural furrows end in nodes. → Holyoakia simpsoni
