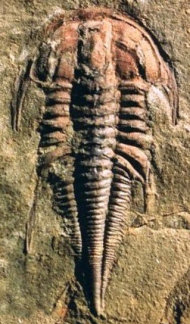
- Balcoracania dailyi of the family Emuellidae; Lower Cambrian Emu Shale; Kangaroo Island, South Australia © Dave Simpson

Scientific classification
- Kingdom: Animalia
- Phylum: Arthropoda
- Clade: †Artiopoda
- Class: †Trilobita
- Order: †Redlichiida
- Superfamily: †Emuelloidea
- Family: †Emuellidae; Pocock, 1970

Genera
- Balcoracania Pocock, 1970; Emuella Pocock, 1970

= Emuellidae =

Emuellidae Temporal range: 517 Ma late Botomian

Extinct family of trilobites

Emuellidae are a small family of trilobites, a group of extinct marine arthropods, that lived during the late Lower Cambrian (late Botomian) of the East Gondwana supercontinent, in what are today South-Australia and Antarctica.

== Description ==
Emuellidae can be recognized among trilobites in having a set of unique features. The headshield or cephalon has large genal spines reaching as far back as the 3rd to 6th segment of the thorax. The eye-ridges contact the back of the frontal lobe of the glabella and extend laterally and backwards, roughly parallel to the frontal and lateral rim of the cephalon. There are small, clearly incised pits at the junction between the eye-ridge and the frontal lobe of the cephalic axis (or glabella). The thorax reaches its greatest width at the 6th segment. The frontal part or prothorax consists of 6 segments, with number 5 and 6 fused, and the 6th carrying very large trailing spines. The rear part or opistothorax consists of a variable but extremely large number of segments (up to 97).

(See the Trilobite article for a definition of morphological terms)

Cephalon: Cranidium subquadrate, glabella cylindrical, slightly contracted at S3, three pairs of glabellar furrows, preglabellar field short or absent, eye ridge wide, long, directed slightly postero-laterally, palpebral lobe crescentic, posterior area of fixigena with fulcrum, free cheeks (or librigenae) with long spines; hypostome conterminant, attached to a narrow rostral plate.

The thorax is divided into a prothorax of six segments (the 6th carrying very large, trailing, pleural spines) and extremely long opisthothorax of up to 97 segments (Balcoraciana dailyi holds the record for greatest number of thoracic segments in a trilobite species).

Pygidium: A minute, segmented disc.

== Taxonomic history ==
Fossils now assigned to the Emuellidae were first discovered by Dr. B. Daily, of the Geology Department, University of Adelaide in 1956.

=== Position of the Emuellidae within the Redlichiida ===
Originally, the Emuellidae were described as part of the Redlichiina. The primitive features prompted the theory that the Emuellids actually represented the stem group of all trilobites, with the Olenellina having secondary fused facial sutures. Later, the Emuellidae were placed in their own superfamily (Emuelloidea), recognizing that trilobites lacking facial sutures (i.e. the Olenellina) are the stem group. This was followed by the clustering of the Emuellidae in a new superfamily Ellipsocephaloidea. Most recently, the Emuellidae are regarded an early branch of the Redlichiina suborder, the closest relatives being the genera Bigotina, Abadiella, and the close-knit group of the families Estaingiidae, Ichangiidae and Ellipsocephalidae.

=== Genera assigned to the Emuellidae ===
Holyoakia has previously been assigned to the Emuellidae. The tailshield (or pygidium) in Holyoakia is about the same size as its cranidium, with a well-defined axis, eight axial rings, well-developed pleural ribs and furrows, and a spiny margin. The pygidia of Emuella and Balcoracania however are poorly differentiated, minute, and have a smooth margin. Later scholars therefore placed Holyoakia in the Dorypygidae.

== Distribution ==
Balcoracania dailyi occurs in the late Lower Cambrian (late Botomian) of South Australia (White Point conglomerate, Cape d' Estaing and Emu Bay sections, Kangaroo Island; Warragee Member, Billy Creek Formation, Flinders Range; Coads Hill Member, Billy Creek Formation, Reaphook Hill). Balcoracania sp. has been collected from the Lower Cambrian of Antarctica (Shackleton Limestone, central Transantarctic Mountains).

Emuella dalgarnoi is found in the late Lower Cambrian (late Botomian) of South Australia (Emu Bay Shale, Kangaroo Island).

Emuella polymera has been collected from the late Lower Cambrian (late Botomian) of South Australia (Cape d' Estaing section, Kangaroo Island).

== Key to the species ==
1	Cephalon subpentagonal. Glabella contacts the frontal margin of the cephalon. Axis at the 3rd thorax segment much wider than each of the pleural zones. Up to 58 thorax segments. → 2
-	Cephalon semicircular. There is a short distance between the glabella and the frontal margin of the cephalon. Axis at the 3rd thorax segment almost as wide as each of the pleural zones. Up to 103 thorax segments. South Australia and Antarctica. → Balcoracania dailyi Pocock, 1970
2	Rear border of the cephalon narrower between the midline and the intergenal angle than between the intergenal angle and the genal angle. South Australia. → Emuella polymera Pocock, 1970
-	Rear border of the cephalon wider between the midline and the intergenal angle than between the intergenal angle and the genal angle. South Australia. → Emuella dalgarnoi Pocock, 1970
