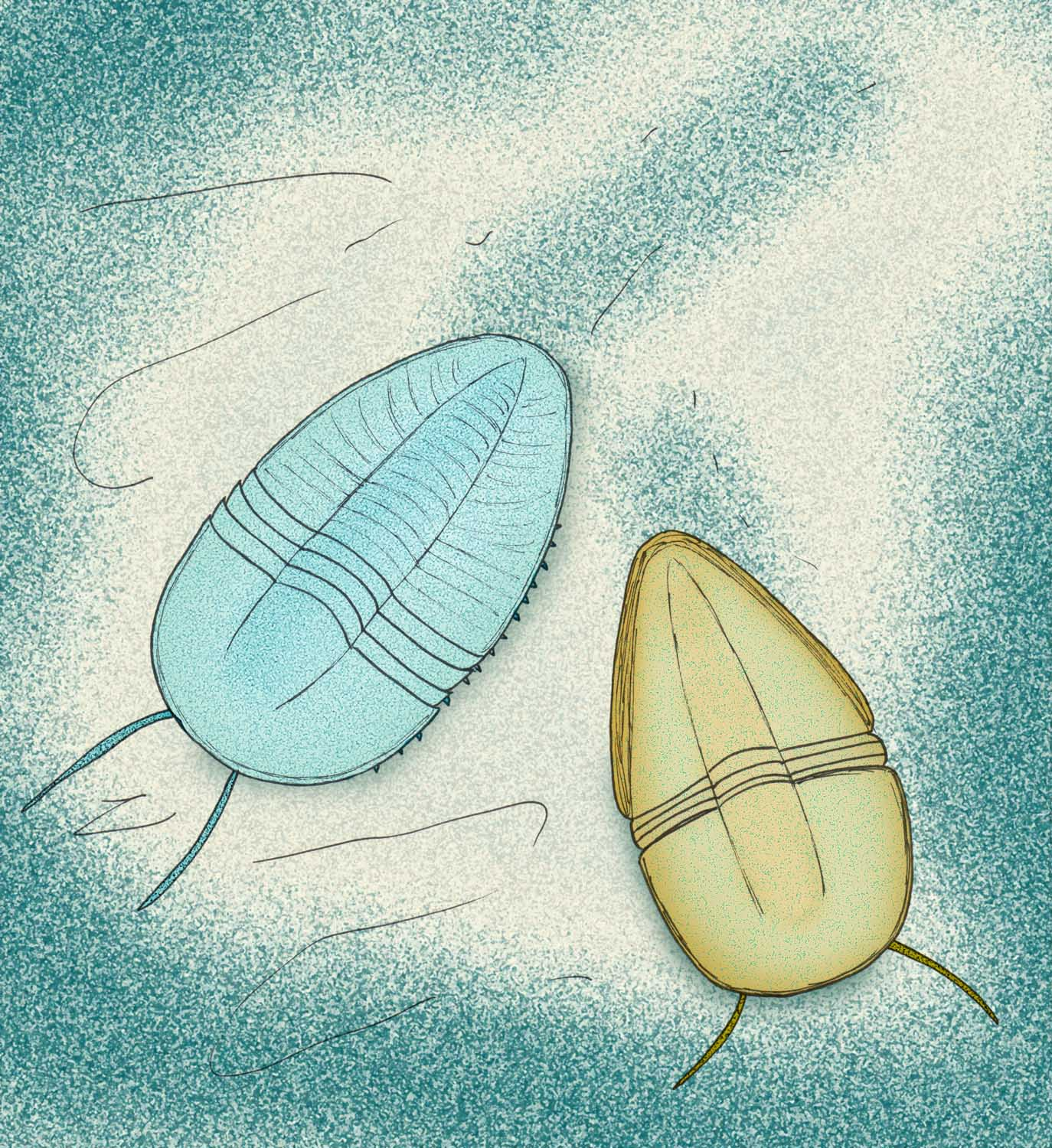
- Kangacaris and Emucaris

Scientific classification
- Kingdom: Animalia
- Phylum: Arthropoda
- Clade: †Artiopoda
- Order: †Nektaspida
- Family: †Emucarididae; Paterson et al., 2010

Genera
- †Emucaris; †Kangacaris; †Tafilocaris

= Emucarididae =

Emucarididae Temporal range: Cambrian stage 3–Late Ordovician

Extinct family of arthropods

Emucarididae is an extinct family of soft-shelled trilobite-like arthropods (nektaspids) from the Lower Cambrian of South Australia and South China and from the Upper Ordovician of Morocco. It contains only three genera – Emucaris, Kangacaris and Tafilocaris. Two species were described in 2010 from specimens recovered from Emu Bay Shale Lagerstätte, one species in 2012 from the Maotianshan Shales and another one in 2025 from the Tafilalt biota, which is the largest nektaspid known. Emucarididae is classified under the order Nektaspida, and is a sister-group to the families Liwiidae and Naraoiidae.

== Description ==
The Emucarididae have a non-calcified exoskeleton that consists of an articulating head shield (or cephalon), thorax and tail shield (or pygidium), and there are no constrictions where these parts meet. The cephalon is semi-circular and has a straight back margin. The thorax consists of 3 or 4 narrow segments. The pygidium is 1-2× as long as the cephalon and has a distinct border furrow. The mouth plate (or hypostome) that sits on the belly-side of the cephalon is elongated and divided by a straight left-to-right suture. The frontal portion is approximately square with two pointed horns that extend from the frontal margin to the sides (like in a capital T), the back portion is longer than wide with a round back margin. The pair of relatively short antennas are implanted behind the horns of the hypostome and stick out to the sides. There appear to be three pairs of limbs under the cephalon, carrying side branches with bristle-like gills (or setae).
