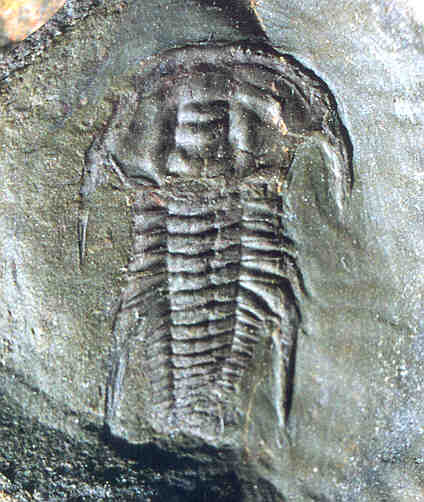
- Emuella polymera of the Emuella genus; Lower Cambrian Emu Shale, Kangaroo Island, South Australia (courtesy of Dave Simpson)

Scientific classification
- Kingdom: Animalia
- Phylum: Arthropoda
- Clade: †Artiopoda
- Class: †Trilobita
- Order: †Redlichiida
- Family: †Emuellidae
- Genus: †Emuella; Pocock, 1970

Species
- Emuella polymera Pocock, 1970; Emuella dalgarnoi Pocock, 1970

= Emuella =

Emuella Temporal range: 517 Ma late Botomian

Extinct genus of trilobites

Emuella is a genus of Cambrian trilobites of the family Emuellidae. Its fossils have been found in South Australia.

== Etymology ==
The genus name means "little emu", and refers to Emu Bay Shale, on Kangaroo Island, one of the sites where fossils of Emuella have been collected. The species epithet polymera is derived from Greek words πολύ -poly- meaning "many"; and μέρος -meros- meaning "part", for the many segmented thorax. E. dalgarnoi is named after R.C. Dalgarno, who discovered Balcoracania dailyi in the Flinders Ranges, near Blinman, South Australia.

== Description ==
It can be recognised by touching glabella and frontal border, and the sub-pentagonal head, as compared to, a short field between the front of the axis in the head or glabella and the border ridge, and a semi-circular headsheald in the sister-genus Balcoracania. Both emuellid genera share eye ridges that are positioned parallel to the frontal and lateral border of the head, prominent genal spines that are a smooth continuation of the lateral margin of the head, a prothorax of 6 segments, with the 5th and 6th merged and carrying large trailing spines. Both genera have in adulthood a highly variable but large number of segments of the opistothorax, although the largest number found in B. dailyi with 97 is much larger than in Emuella (52).

== Further information ==
- Hagadorn, J.W. (2002). "Burgess Shale-type Localities: The global picture". In Bottjer, D.J.; W. Etter; J.W. Hagadorn; C.M. Tang (eds.). Exceptional Fossil Preservation -- A Unique View on the Evolution of Marine Life. Columbia University Press. ISBN 0231102542.
- Greg Edgecombe & the Australian Museum. "Australian Trilobites: A Species List and Bibliography". Archived from the original on April 28, 2008.
- Sam Gon III. "Order Redlichiida". Archived from the original on October 22, 2023.
- Nedin, C. (1995). "The Emu Bay Shale, a Lower Cambrian fossil Lagerstätte, Kangaroo Island, South Australia". Memoirs of the Association of Australasian Palaeontologists. 18: 31–40.
- Simpson, Dave. "Trilobites of South Australia". Archived from the original on February 19, 2006.
