= Canglangpuian =

Chinese regional subdivision of the Cambrian

Cambrian graphical timeline

| ← | Orsten Fauna |

| ← | Burgess Shale |

| ← | Kaili biota |

| ← | Archaeocyatha extinction |

| ← | Emu Bay Shale |

| ← | Sirius Passet biota |

| ← | Chengjiang biota |

| ← | First Trilobites |

| ← | SSF diversification, first brachiopods & archaeocyatha |

| ← | First halkieriids, mollusсs, hyoliths SSF |

| ← | Baykonurian glaciation |

| ← | Dresbachian extinction |

| Major Glacial period |

Subdivision of the Cambrian according to the ICS, as of 2024.
Vertical axis scale: Millions of years ago

The Canglangpuian age is a Chinese regional subdivision of the Cambrian, corresponding approximately to Cambrian Stage 4.
