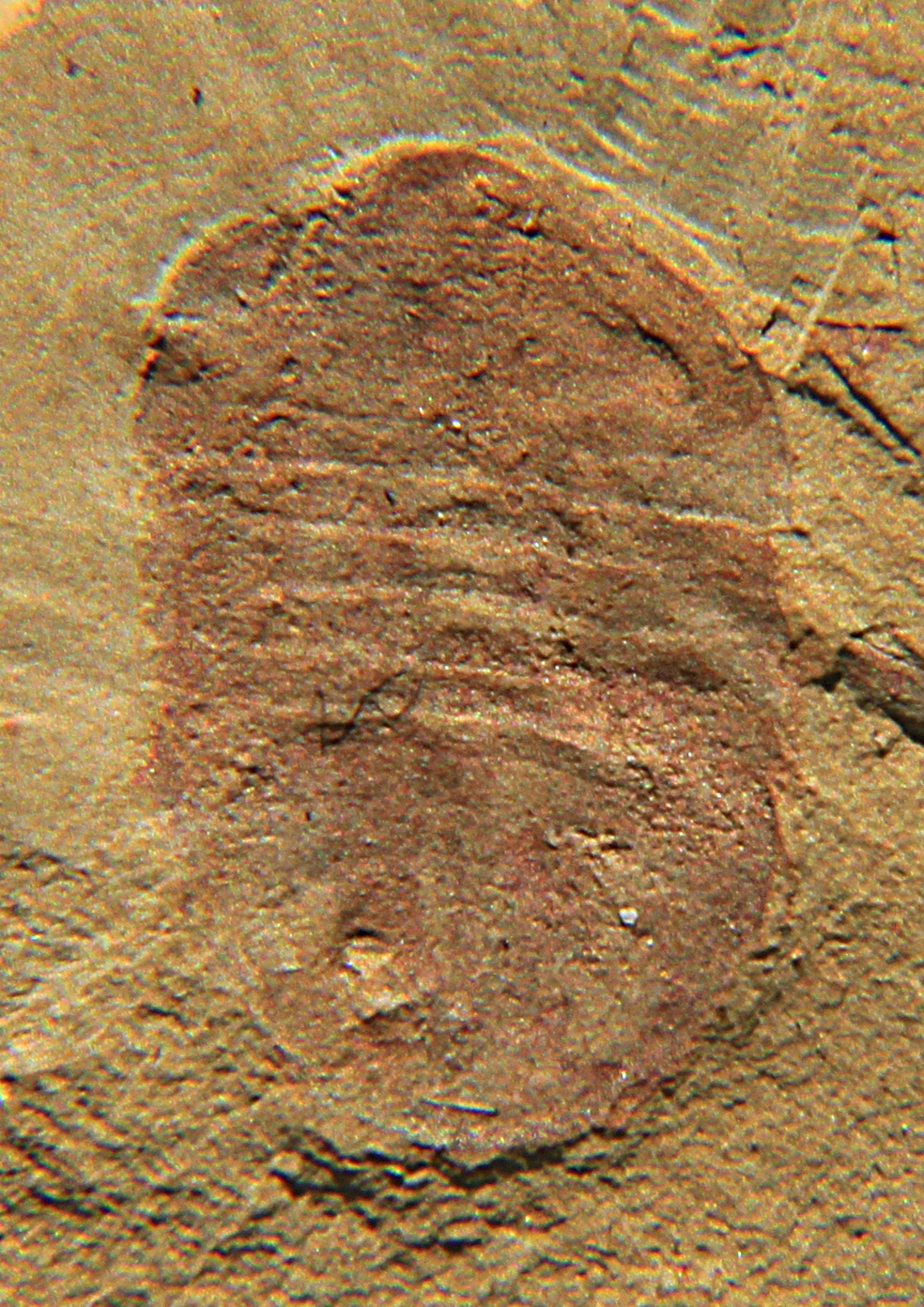
- Panlongia spinosa

Scientific classification
- Kingdom: Animalia
- Phylum: Arthropoda
- Clade: †Artiopoda
- Order: †Nektaspida
- Genus: †Panlongia; Liu et al., 2006

Species
- P. tetranodusa Liu et al. 2006; P. spinosa Liu et al. 2006

= Panlongia =

Panlongia Temporal range: lowest Botomian

Marine arthropod

Panlongia was a small-sized marine arthropod. Panlongia lived during the late Lower Cambrian (Botomian) in what is today South China. The genus consists of two species, P. spinosa and P. tetranodus.

== Description ==
Panlongia is a flat, 2 cm (0.8 in) long nektaspid, with an oval-shaped non-calcified exoskeleton. Both the head shield (or cephalon) and the tail shield (or pygidium) are semi-circular. In between the cephalon and pygidium are four thoracic body segments (somites). The cephalon occupies approximately ⅓ of the body length, the thorax ¼ and pygidium about 45%.

In Panlongia spinosa, the edge of the exoskeleton carries several small sawtooth-like spines, that are absent in P. tetranodusa.

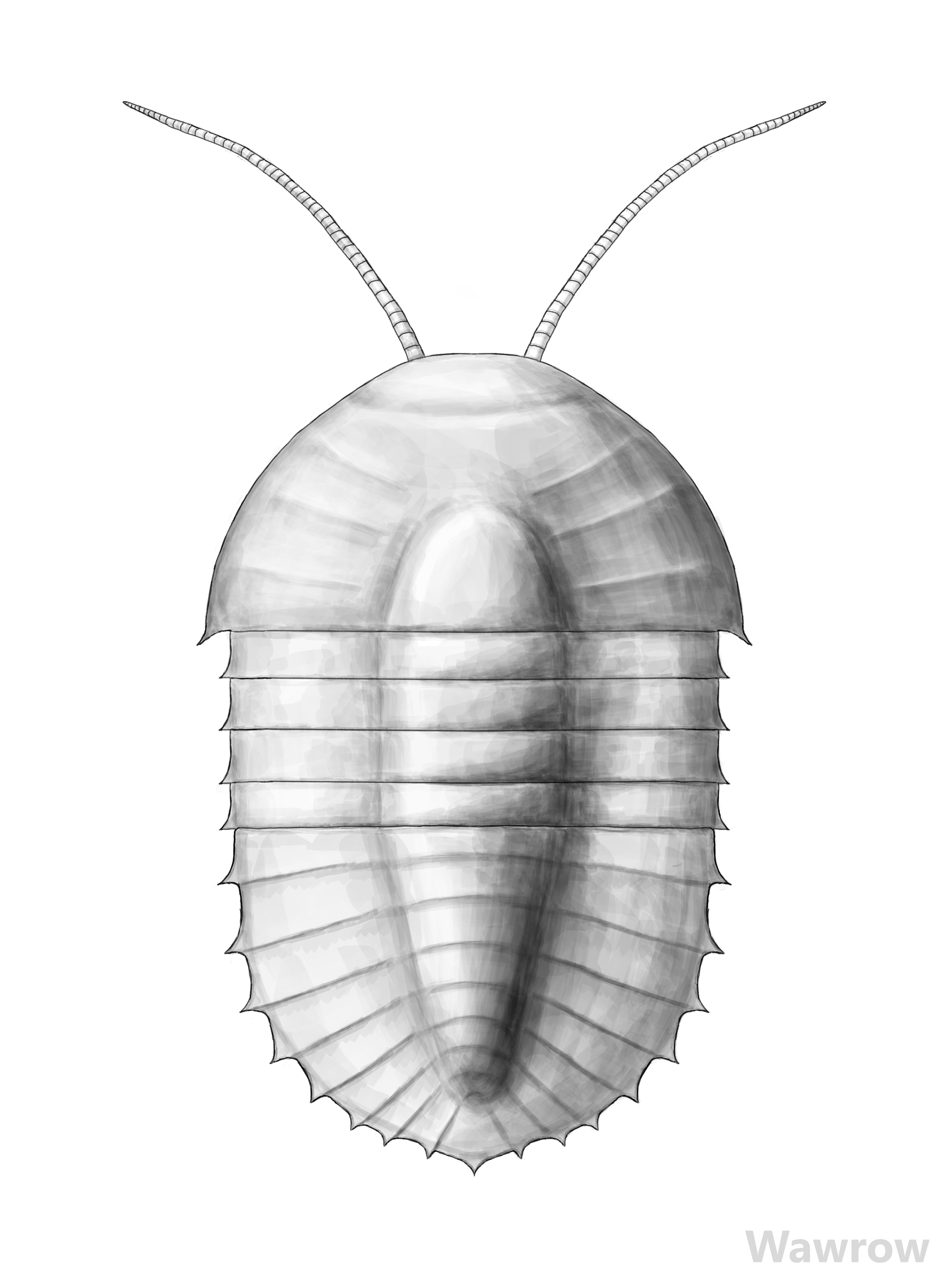
Panlongia tetranodusa reconstruction

== Distribution ==
- Panlongia spinosa is found in the late Lower Cambrian (Botomian) of China (Wulongqing Formation, only at Gaoloufang Kgs-2).
- Panlongia tetranodusa occurs in the late Lower Cambrian (Botomian) of China (Wulongqing Formation, Gaoloufang Kgs-1, and Shijiangjun Wsh-14, Wuding County, Yunnan, "Guanshan fauna").

== Taxonomy ==
The phylogenetic position of Panlongia remained uncertain due to the lack of appendages until 2024, when more well-preserved specimens with appendages narrowed its placement down to as a nektaspid.

== Ecology ==
Panlongia tetranodusa occurs with the coeloscleritophoran Allonia sp., the vetulicolian Vetulicola gangtoucunensis, lingulate brachiopods Lingulellotreta malongensis, Diandongia pista, Acrothele rara, and Westonia gubaiensis; radiodonts Houcaris saron and Guanshancaris kunmingensis, hyolith Linevitus malongensis, eocrinoid Wudingeocrinus rarus, Trilobites Redlichia yunnanensis, R. mansuyi, R. noetlingi, R. conica, R. shijiangjunensis, Palaeolenus douvillei, and P. lantenoisi; crustaceans: Tuzoia sinensis, T. tylodesa, Branchiocaris sp., Liangshanella liangshanensis, and Neokunmingella sp., and several other arthropods like Longquania bispinosa, Guangweicaris spinatus; Leanchoilia illecebrosa, Isoxys minor and I. wudingensis.

== See also ==
- Cambrian explosion
- Phytophilaspis
