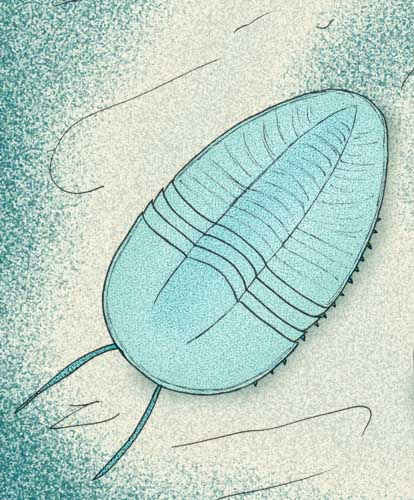
- Kangacaris zhangi

Scientific classification
- Kingdom: Animalia
- Phylum: Arthropoda
- Clade: †Artiopoda
- Order: †Nektaspida
- Family: †Emucarididae
- Genus: †Kangacaris; Paterson et al., 2010

Species
- K. zhangi Paterson et al., 2010 (type species); K. shui Zhang, Fu & Dai, 2012

= Kangacaris =

Kangacaris Temporal range: 517 Ma, Botomian

Extinct genus of arthropods

Kangacaris is an extinct genus of soft-shelled trilobite-like arthropod of the nektaspid order from the Lower Cambrian (Botomian). K. zhangi is known from South Australia, and K. shui from South-West China.

== Etymology ==
The generic name is derived from "Kanga", a contraction of Kangaroo Island, and Latin caris ("shrimp"). The specific name of the type species honors the Chinese palaeontologist Xingliang Zhang.

== Description ==
The dorsal exoskeleton of Kangacaris is inverted egg-shaped, about 3 centimetres (1.2 in) long and 2 cm (0.79 in) wide. The axis is 1/3× as wide as the body and only slightly raised. The semi-circular headshield (or cephalon) is about 2/3× as long as the tailshield (pygidium), and in between them three short thoracic body segments (somites). The lateral margin of the pygidium is progressively angling towards the axis, ending in the slightest hint of a point. Twelve to thirteen furrows are most distinct on the axis, and becoming indiscernible near the border. The border of the cephalon is about 1/4× as long (axially) as the thoracal somites, and the border of the pygidium is about 1/2× as long as the somites. This border has about 17 regularly spaced ridges perpendicular to the rim. K. shui has a better defined and narrower axis, more arched posterior margin of the cephalic shield, more posterolaterally deflected pleural areas of the thoracic segments, and smaller pygidium than K. zhangi.

=== Differences from Emucaris fava ===
Kangacaris differs from Emucaris fava in having three thorax segments, while Emucaris has four. When disregarding the border, Kangacaris has an inverted egg-shape, while the pygidium of Emucaris is a triangle with a rounded termination. The axis of the pygidium of Kangacaris is 1/3 of the width of the body and clearly segmented, while in Emucaris it is one fifth and has a pattern of polygons of approximately equal area. The axis of the pygidium of Emucaris terminates in a spine that ends at the outer rim of the border, while Kangacaris lacks a terminal spine.

== Distribution ==
Fossils of K. zhangi were collected from the Emu Bay Shale of Kangaroo Island, South Australia. Remains of K. shui have been found at the Maotianshan Shales, Yunnan, South-West China.
