= Ichangia =

Ichangia Temporal range: Early Botomian

Scientific classification
- Kingdom: Animalia
- Phylum: Arthropoda
- Clade: †Artiopoda
- Class: †Trilobita
- Order: †Ptychopariida
- Family: †Estaingiidae
- Genus: †Ichangia; Chang, 1957

Ichangia is an extinct genus of ptychopariid trilobites of the family Estaingiidae. It lived during the early part of the Botomian stage of the Cambrian Period, which lasted from approximately 524 to 518.5 million years ago in Hubei and Henan Provinces, China.
