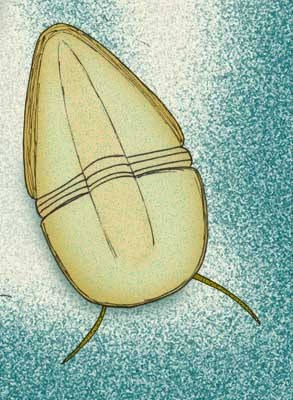
- Emucaris fava

Scientific classification
- Kingdom: Animalia
- Phylum: Arthropoda
- Clade: †Artiopoda
- Order: †Nektaspida
- Family: †Emucarididae
- Genus: †Emucaris; Paterson et al., 2010
- Species: †E. fava

Binomial name
- †Emucaris fava Paterson et al., 2010

= Emucaris =

Emucaris fava Temporal range: Cambrian Stage 4

Extinct genus of arthropods

Emucaris fava is an extinct species of soft-shelled trilobite-like arthropod of the nektaspid order from the Lower Cambrian (Cambrian Stage 4) of South Australia. It is the only species classified under the genus Emucaris.

== Etymology ==
The generic name is derived from the Emu Bay Shale, the deposit where the species was collected, and the Latin word caris meaning shrimp. The specific name fava is from the Latin word for honeycomb, for the ornamentation on its pygidial axis.

== Description ==
The outline of the dorsal exoskeleton of E. fava is pointed inverted egg-shaped, between 1.5 centimetres (0.59 in) and 3 centimetres (1.2 in) long and about 1 2/3 times as long as wide. The axis is up to 15% of the width of the body and only slightly raised. The semi-circular headshield (or cephalon) is about half as long as the tailshield (pygidium), and in between them four short thoracic body segments (somites). When disregarding the border, the pygidium of Emucaris is a triangle with a rounded termination, carrying a spine that ends at the outer rim of the border. There is no discernible segmentation visible. The axis in Emucaris is about one fifth of the pygidium and has a pattern of polygons of approximately equal area. The border of the cephalon is inconspicuous, and the border of the pygidium is longer than the somites. This border lacks ornamentation.

=== Differences from Kangacaris ===
Kangacaris has only three thorax segments. The exoskeletal outline of Kangacaris is an inverted egg-shape. The axis of the pygidium of Kangacaris is a third of the width of the body and clearly segmented. The axis of the pygidium Kangacaris lacks a terminal spine. The pygidial border of Kangacaris has 17 equally spaced ridges perpendicular to the edge of the border.

== Distribution ==
Fossils of E. fava were collected from the Emu Bay Shale of Kangaroo Island, South Australia.
