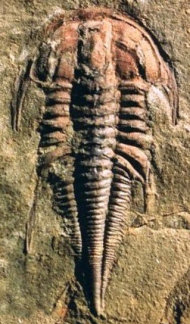
- Balcoracania dailyi from Kangaroo Island, South Australia

Scientific classification
- Kingdom: Animalia
- Phylum: Arthropoda
- Clade: †Artiopoda
- Class: †Trilobita
- Order: †Redlichiida
- Family: †Emuellidae
- Genus: †Balcoracania; Pocock, 1970

Species
- Balcoracania dailyi Popock, 1970, synonym B. flindersi

= Balcoracania =

Balcoracania Temporal range: 517 Ma late Botomian

Extinct genus of trilobites

Balcoracania dailyi is a small (typically about 1.5 centimetres (0.59 in)) trilobite of the family Emuellidae. Its fossils have been found in south Australia and Antarctica.

== Etymology ==
The genus name is derived from Balcoracana Creek in the Flinders Ranges, one of the sites where fossils of Balcoracania were collected. The species epithet dailyi is in honor of Dr. B. Daily, of the Geology Department, University of Adelaide.

== Description ==
It can be recognised by a short field between the front of the axis in the head (or glabella) and the border ridge, and a semi-circular headshield, as compared to touching glabella and border, and the sub-pentagonal head, in the sister-genus Emuella. Both emuellid genera share eye ridges that are positioned parallel to the frontal and lateral border of the head, prominent genal spines that are a smooth continuation of the lateral margin of the head, a prothorax of 6 segments, with the 5th and 6th merged and carrying large trailing spines. Both genera have in adulthood a highly variable but large number of segments of the opistothorax, although the largest number found in B. dailyi with 97 is much larger than in Emuella (52). B. dailyi is the only known species in this genus (i.e., the genus is monotypic).

== Ecology ==
Balcoracania dailyi was an inhabitant of protected, shallow, marginal, marine environments. B. dailyi is usually the only trilobite present, but brachiopods may be present, too. Tubular burrows show it shared its ecosystem with soft-bodied animals.
