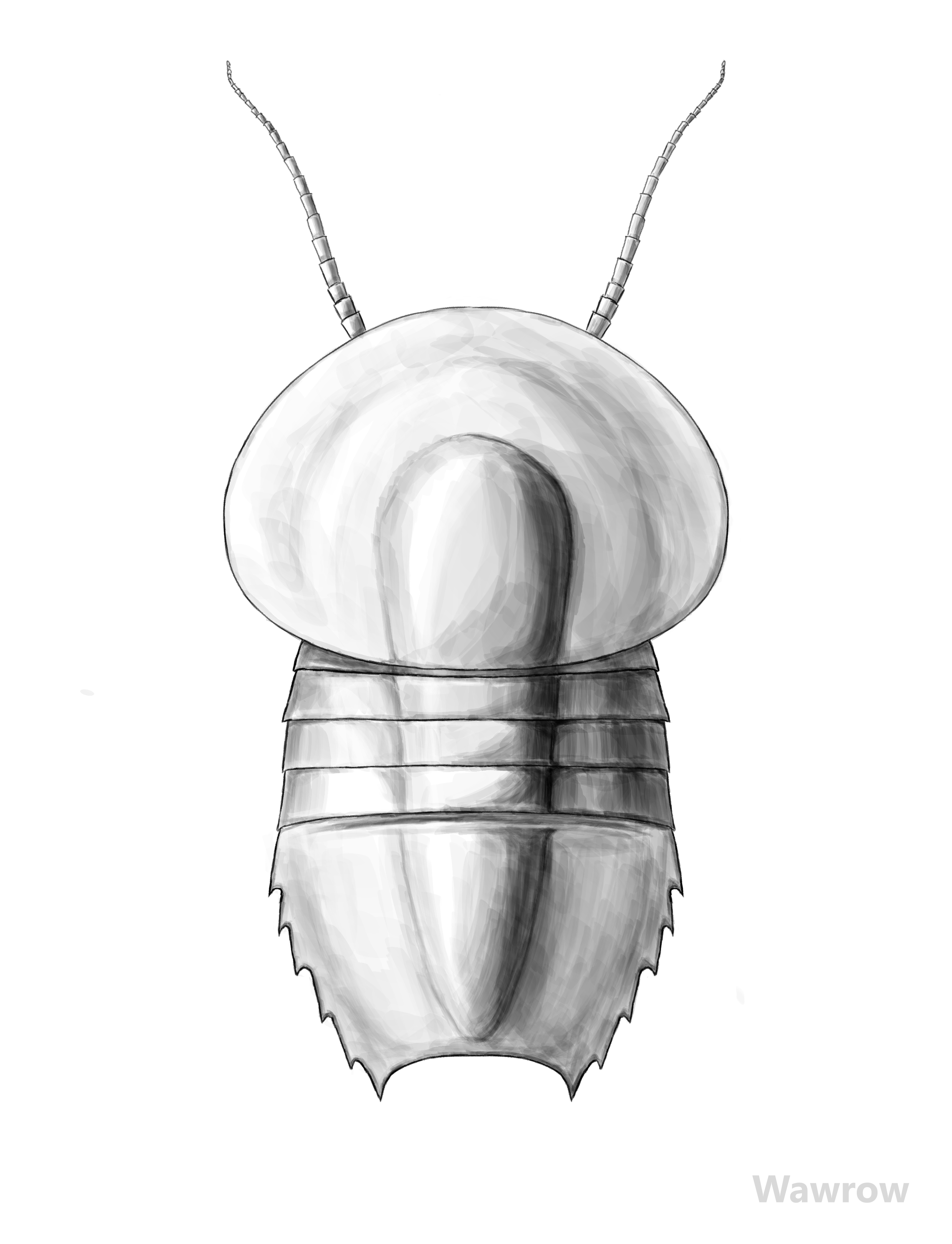
- Life restoration of Liwia

Scientific classification
- Kingdom: Animalia
- Phylum: Arthropoda
- Clade: †Artiopoda
- Order: †Nektaspida
- Family: †Liwiidae; Dzik et Lendzion, 1988

Genera
- See text.

= Liwiidae =

Liwiidae Temporal range: Cambrian–Ordovician

Extinct family of arthropods

Liwiidae is a family of arthropods in the order Nektaspida. Members are known from the Cambrian and Ordovician periods.

== Taxonomy ==
- Liwia Dzik and Lendzion, 1988

- Liwia plana Lendzion, 1975
- Liwia convexa Lendzion, 1975

- Soomaspis Fortey & Theron, 1995

- Soomaspis splendida Fortey & Theron, 1995

- Tariccoia Hammann et al., 1990

- Tariccoia arrusensis Hammann et al., 1990
