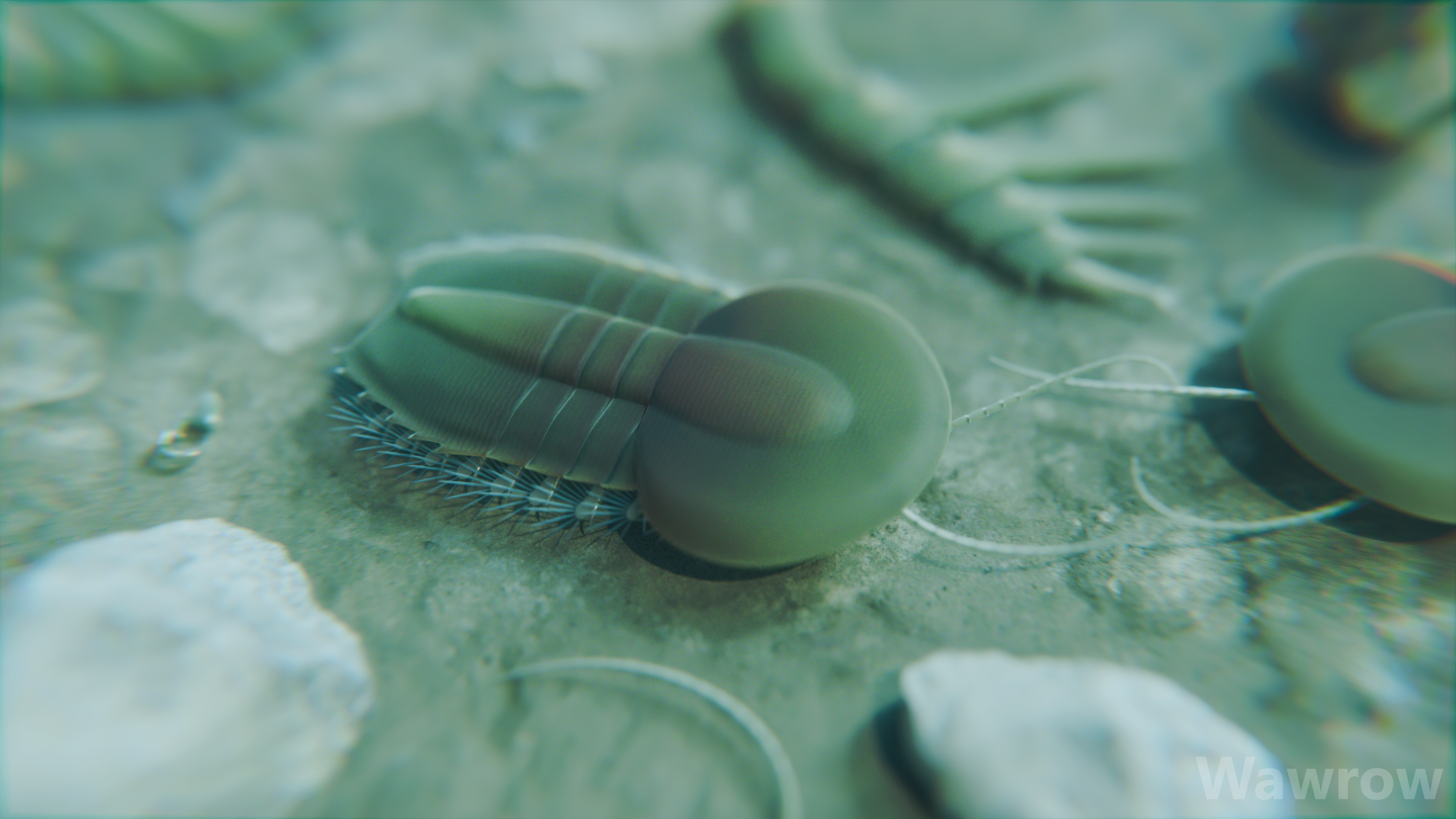
- 3D reconstruction of Liwia, alongside Peytoia infercambriensis appendages in the background

Scientific classification
- Kingdom: Animalia
- Phylum: Arthropoda
- Clade: †Artiopoda
- Order: †Nektaspida
- Family: †Liwiidae
- Genus: †Liwia; Dzik and Lendzion, 1988

Species
- Liwia plana Lendzion, 1975; Liwia convexa Lendzion, 1975

Synonyms
- Livia Lendzion, 1975 (preoccupied)

= Liwia =

Liwia Temporal range: Cambrian Series 2 520–516 Ma

Extinct genus of arthropods

Liwia is a genus of nektaspid of the family Liwiidae from the Early Cambrian. It includes the species Liwia plana and Liwia convexa, both known from borehole samples several kilometers in depth from the Zawiszyn Formation in Poland, which has also yielded Peytoia infercambriensis.

== Discovery and naming ==
The holotype of fossil of Liwia was found from the Zawiszyn Formation of Poland. It was described in 1975.

The original generic name Livia is derived from the name of the Liwiec River, near to where the fossils were found, although as this generic name was already preoccupied, in 1988 it was changed to Liwia.

The specific name for L. convexa derives directly from the Latin word convexa, to mean "rounded", relating to the curved appearance of the pygidium; whilst the specific name for L. plana derives directly from the Latin word plana, to mean "flat", relating the overall flatness of this species.

== Description ==
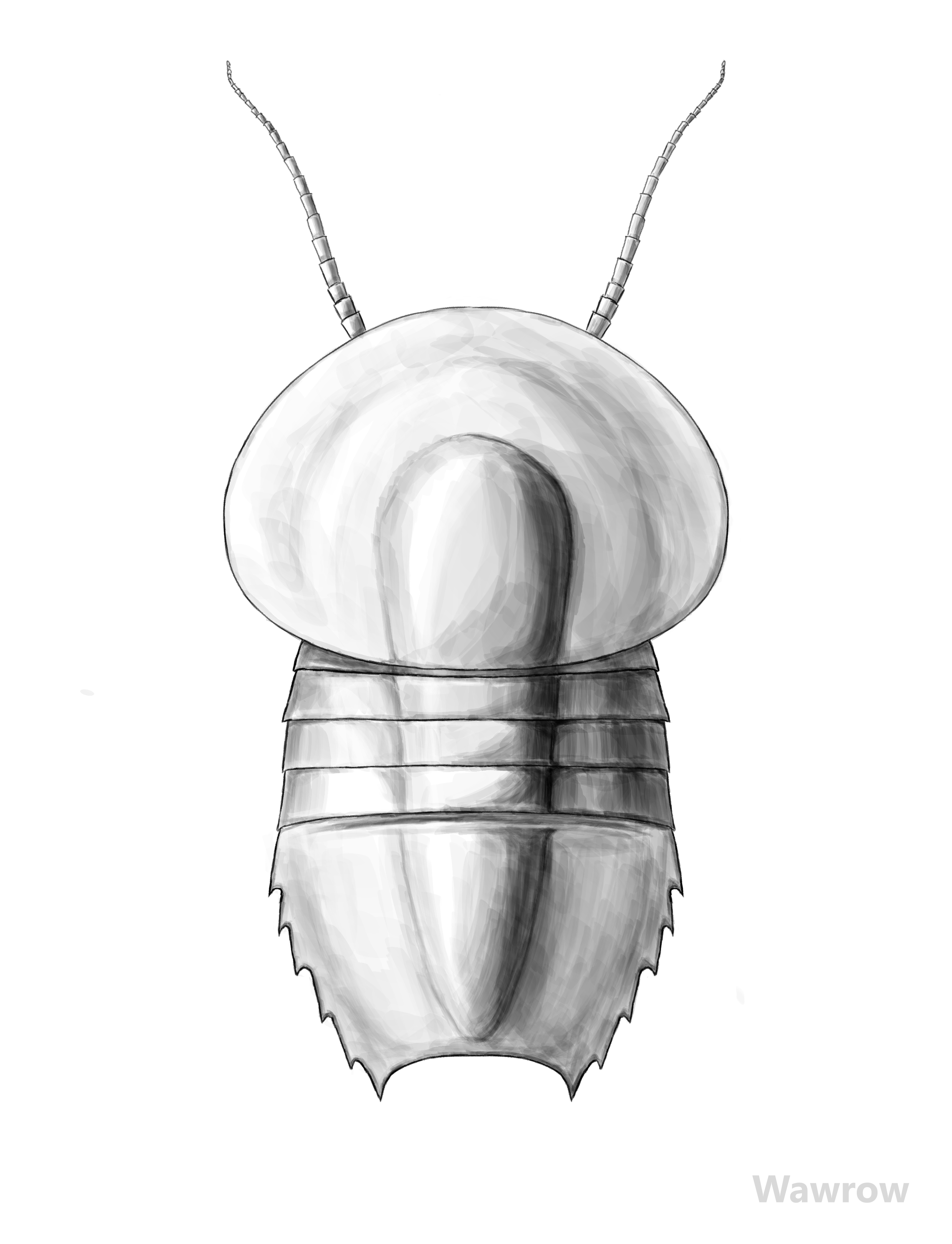
Top down reconstruction of Liwia.

Liwia is a member of the order nektaspida, and the namesake of the Liwiidae family, growing to around 20–30 mm (0.8–1.2 in) in length, with the longer, incomplete species being L. convexa; and the shorter, more complete species being L. plana.

Liwia had an oval shaped cephalon, with four thoracic segments, and a distinctive spiked pygidium, which had six pairs of rear-facing spines, with the three anterior spines being shorter, whilst the three posterior spines are longer.
