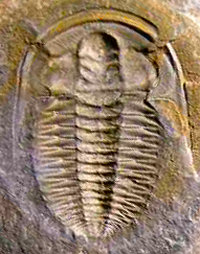
- Estaingia bilobata Lower Cambrian Emu Shale; Kangaroo Island, South Australia © Dave Simpson

Scientific classification
- Kingdom: Animalia
- Phylum: Arthropoda
- Clade: †Artiopoda
- Class: †Trilobita
- Order: †Ptychopariida
- Family: †Estaingiidae
- Genus: †Estaingia
- Species: †E. bilobata

Binomial name
- †Estaingia bilobata Pocock, 1964

Synonyms
- Hsuaspis bilobata

= Estaingia bilobata =

Species of trilobite (fossil)

Estaingia bilobata is a species of trilobite from the lower Cambrian period. Their fossils are found chiefly in Australia.
