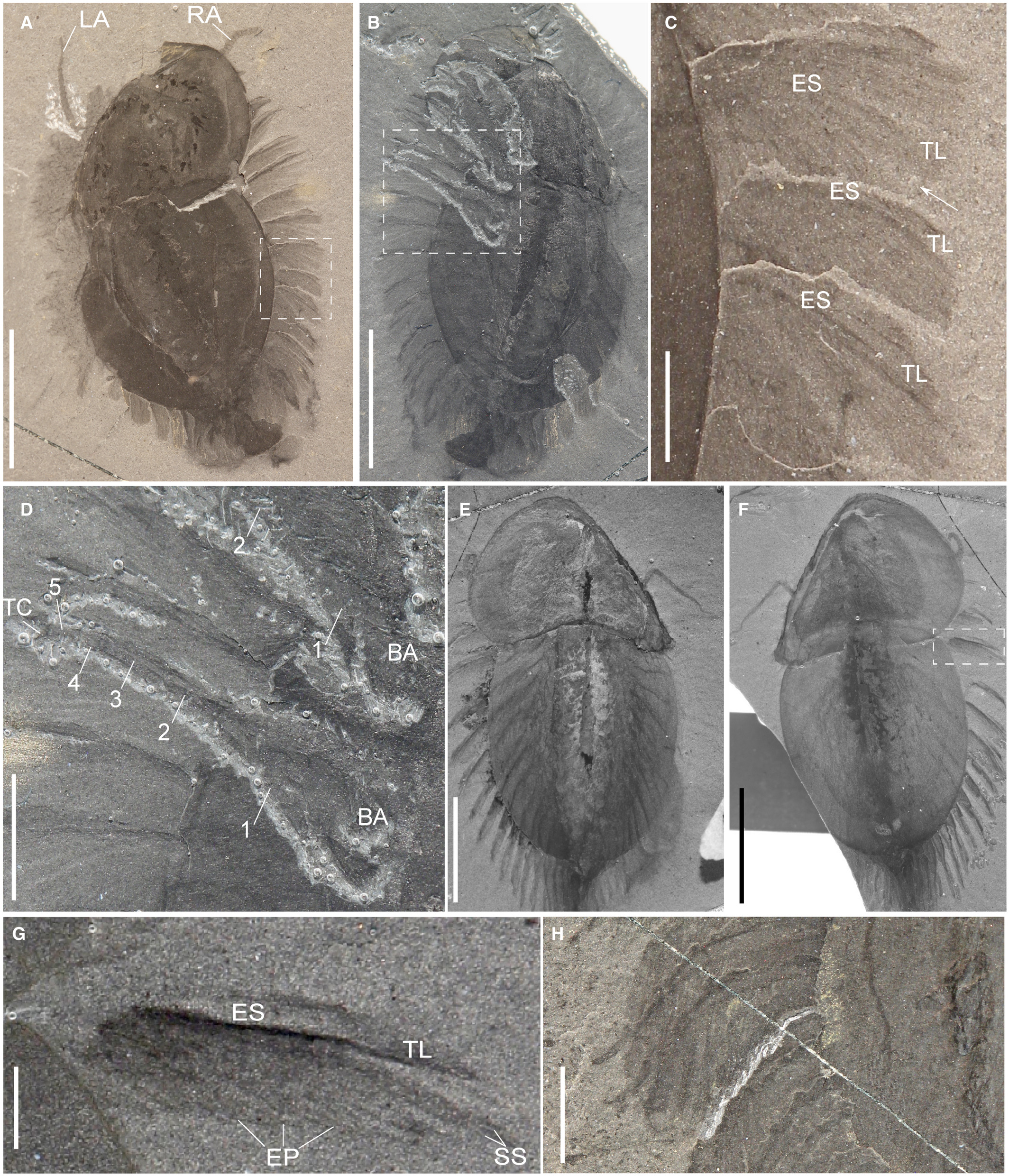
- Naraoia compacta fossils with preserved appendages

Scientific classification
- Kingdom: Animalia
- Phylum: Arthropoda
- Clade: †Artiopoda
- Subphylum: †Trilobitomorpha
- Order: †Nektaspida; Raymond, 1920

Families
- †Emucarididae; †Liwiidae; †Naraoiidae; †Buenaspis; †Campanamuta?; †Panlongia

= Nektaspida =

Nektaspida Temporal range: Atdabanian–Silurian

Extinct order of arthropods

Nektaspida (also called Naraoiida, Nektaspia and Nectaspida) is an extinct order of non-mineralised artiopodan arthropods. They are known from the lower-Cambrian to the upper Silurian. Originally classified as trilobites, which they superficially resemble, they are now placed as close relatives as members of the Trilobitomorpha within Artiopoda. The order is divided into three major families; Emucarididae, Liwiidae, and Naraoiidae.

== Naming history and taxonomic placement ==
The order was originally proposed by Raymond in 1920 as Nektaspia. Størmer corrected it to Nectaspida for the 1959 Treatise on Invertebrate Paleontology to conform with the names of the other trilobite orders. Whittington described it in 1985 with the spelling Nektaspida; the revised 1997 Treatise by Raymond and Fortey uses this spelling, as do other modern works. Whittington (1985) placed the order in the Trilobita. Cotton & Braddy (2000) place it in a new "Trilobite clade" containing the Trilobita, recognizing the close affinities of the nektaspids to trilobites. However this necessitates the inclusion of genera that look very little like trilobites., it was formerly placed in the stem-group to the chelicerata subdivision of the Arthropoda phylum. However, it currently considered part of Artiopoda, the clade that contains trilobites and their close relatives.

== Anatomy ==
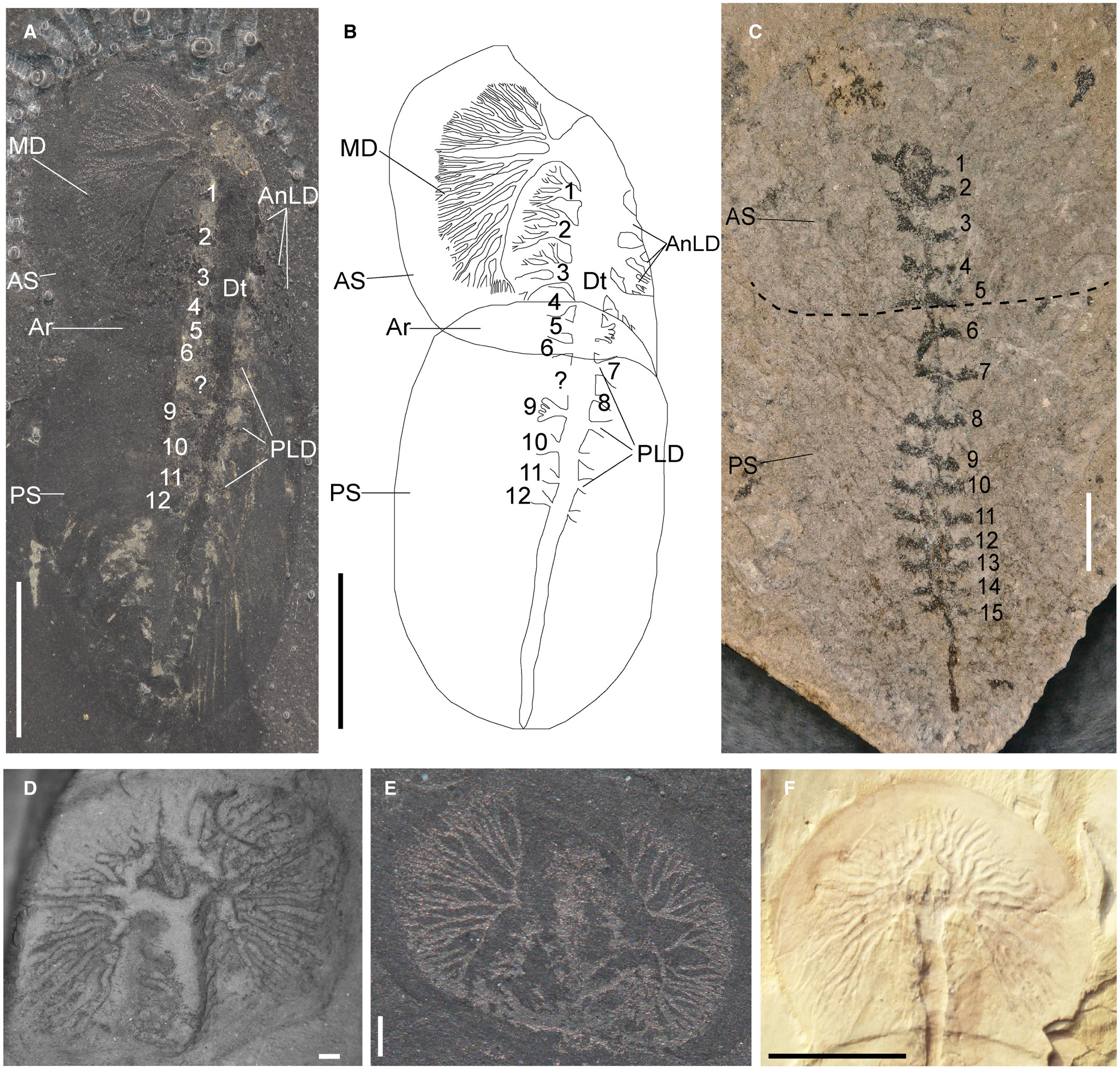
Digestive systems of various naraoiid species

The group is united by several morphological characters, including reduced or absent lateral eyes, a hypostome with a natant attachment, extensive articulation overlap between unfused trunk tergites, and fused pleurae that do not form lateral spines. Preserved soft tissue of the group indicates that the cephalic (head) shield of nektaspids and liwiids contained branched digestive glands. The Naraoiidae have their exoskeletons mostly composed of only two major shields, which have a single articulation point.

== Ecology ==
The naraoiids have been interpreted as benthic organisms that were opportunistic scavengers and predators of soft-bodied prey, with the spine-like endites of the limbs possibly allowing soft-bodied prey to be shredded before ingestion. The differences in gut morphology between some species of naraoiids suggests that some species fed only intermittently, while others fed regularly.

== Evolutionary history ==
The group first appeared and was most diverse in the Cambrian, especially during the Cambrian Series 2. Emucarididae are only known from the Cambrian Series 2 of East Gondwana (now Australia) and the then nearby South China. Naraoiidae were diverse in low latitudes during Cambrian Series 2 and the following Miaolingian in Laurentia and in South China. Liwiidae first appeared in Baltica during the Cambrian, and are absent from major Cambrian deposits elsewhere during this period, but are widespread in the southern high-latitude margin of Gondwana during the Ordovician. The youngest known member of the group is the Laurentian naraoiid Naraoia bertensis from the Bertie Formation in Ontario, Canada, dating to the Upper Silurian.

== Gallery ==
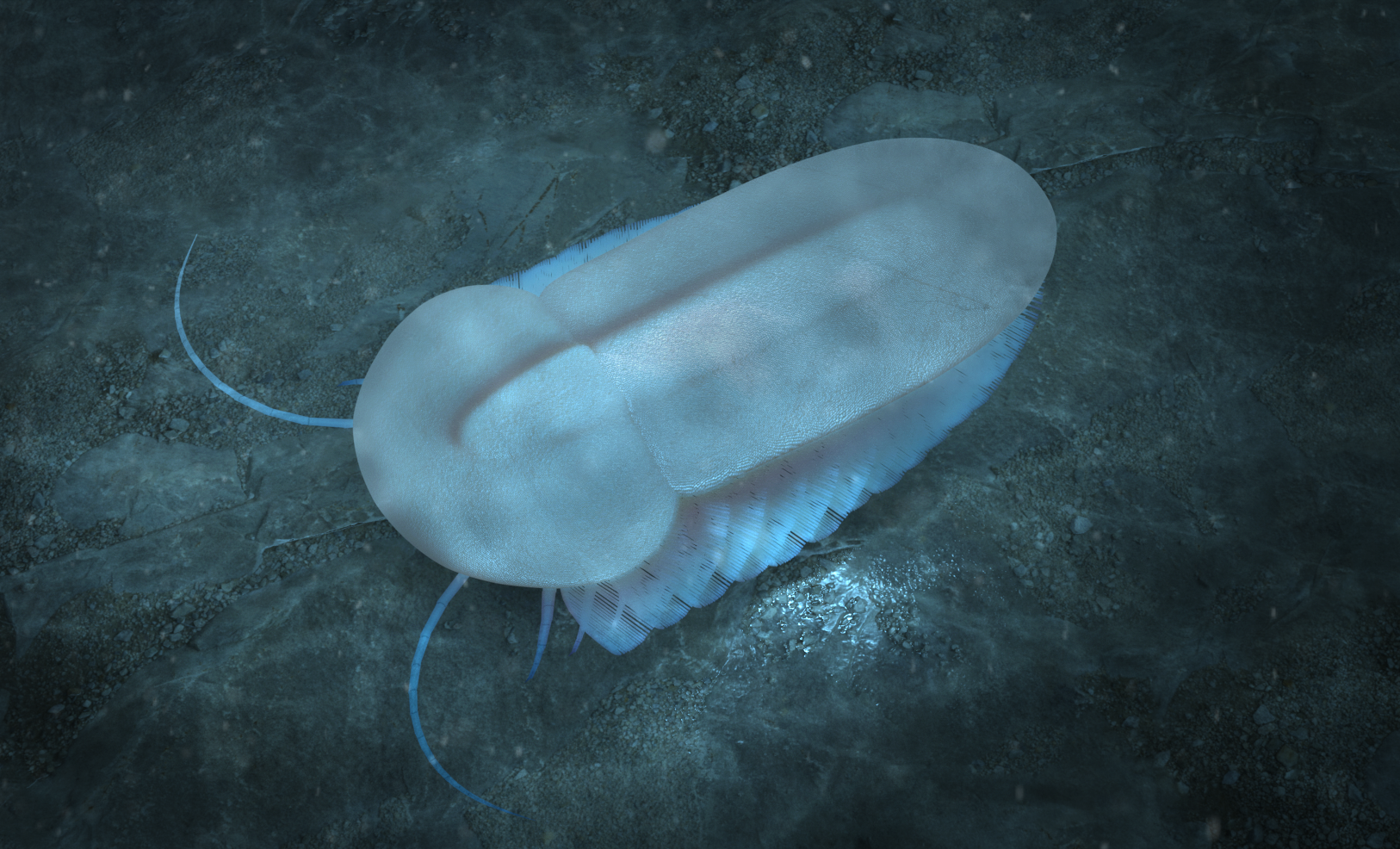
Life restoration of the naraoiid Misszhouia

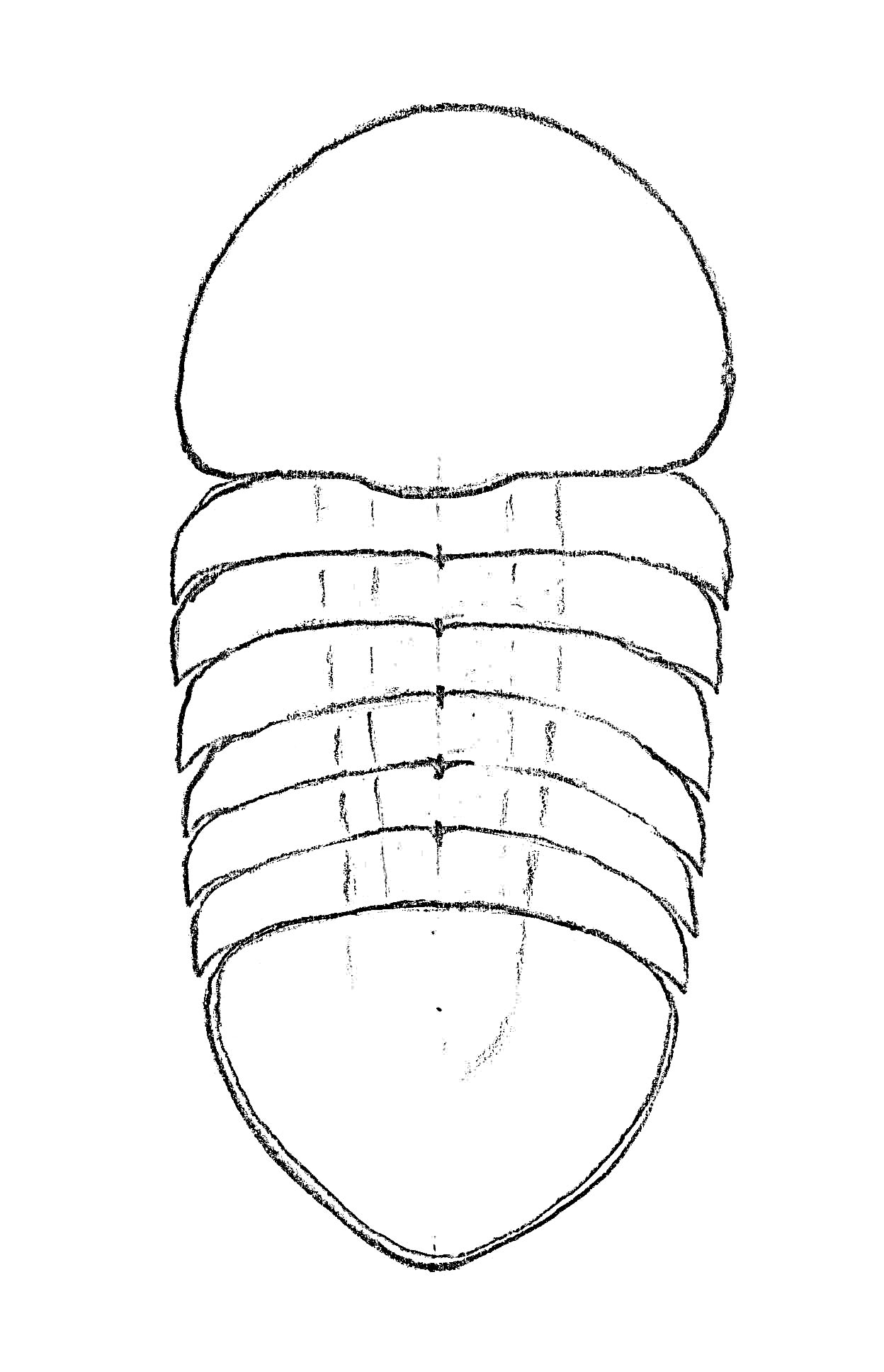
Drawing of the carapace of the incertae sedis nektaspid Buenaspis

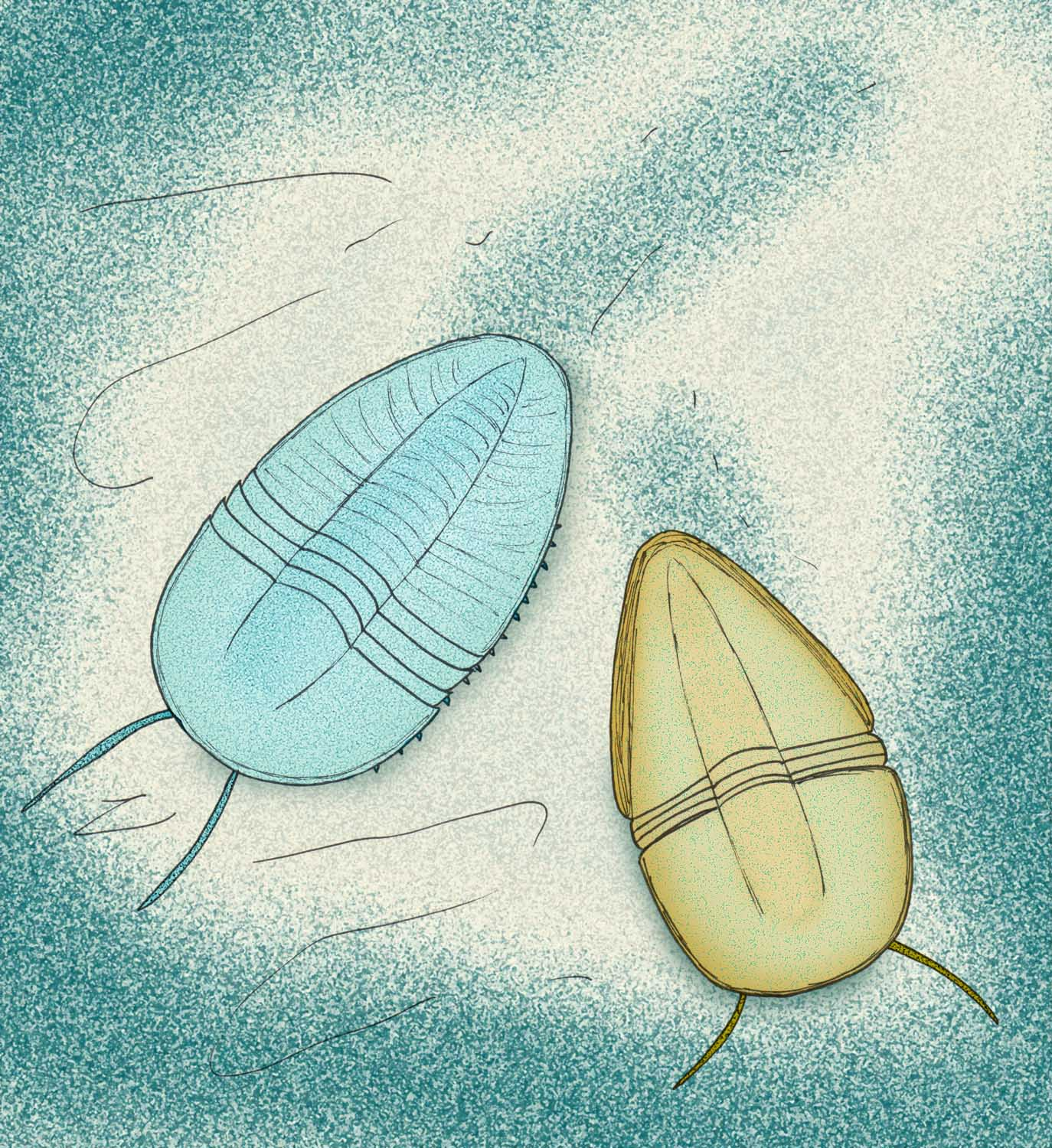
Restoration of the emucaridids Kangacaris (blue, left) and Emucaris (yellow, right)

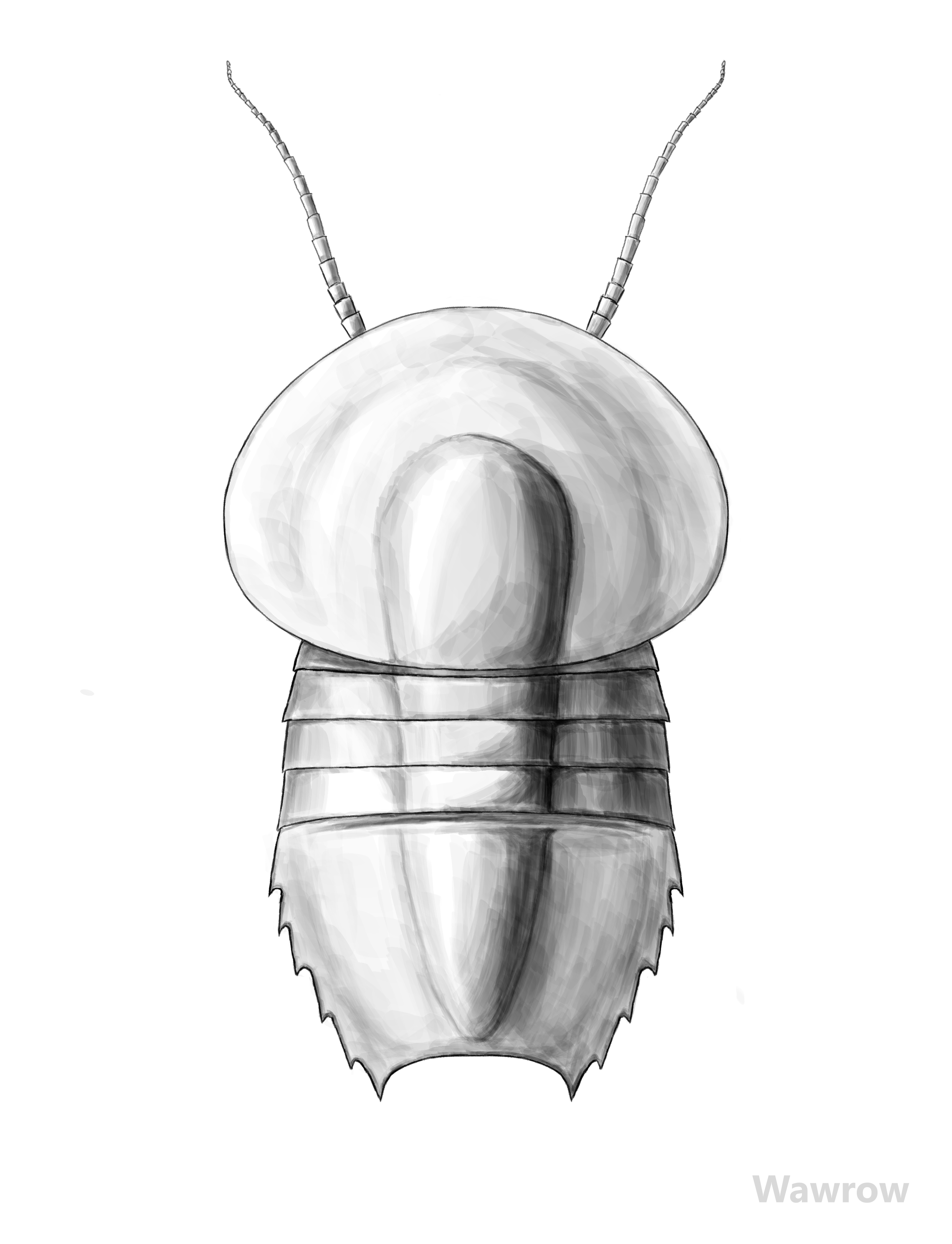
Fossil of the Cambrian liwiid Liwia from Poland

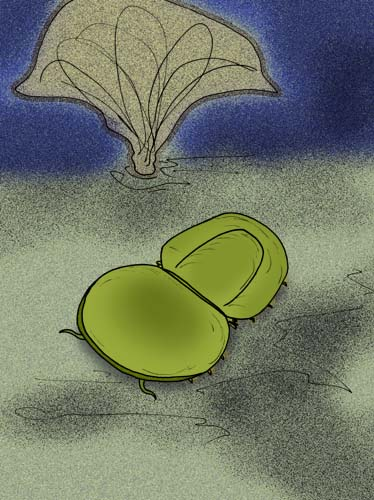
Life restoration of the naraoiid Pseudonaraoia

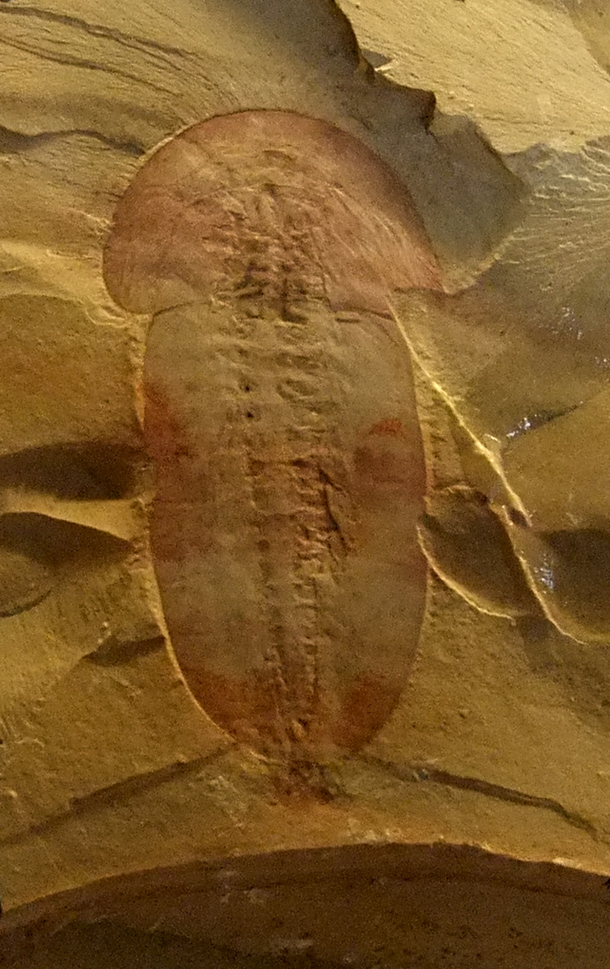
Fossil of Misszhouia longicaudata
