= List of the prehistoric life of New York =

This list of the prehistoric life of New York contains the various prehistoric life-forms whose fossilized remains have been reported from within the US state of New York.

== Precambrian ==
The Paleobiology Database records no known occurrences of Precambrian fossils in Alabama.

== Paleozoic ==
=== Selected Paleozoic taxa of New York ===
- †Acanthoclymenia
- †Acanthodus
- †Achatella
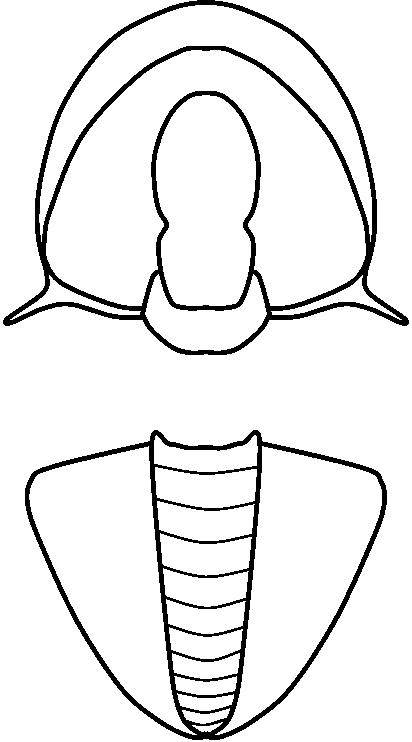
- Illustration of fossils of the Cambrian trilobite Acidiscus
  †Acidiscus
- †Acimetopus
- †Acodus
- †Actinoceras
- †Actinophyllum
- †Acutiramus
- †Agoniatites
- †Agraulos
- †Allotrioceras
- †Amorphognathus
- †Amplexopora
- †Amplexus
- †Analox
- †Anchiopsis
- †Aneurophyton
- †Aphetoceras
- †Aphyllopteris
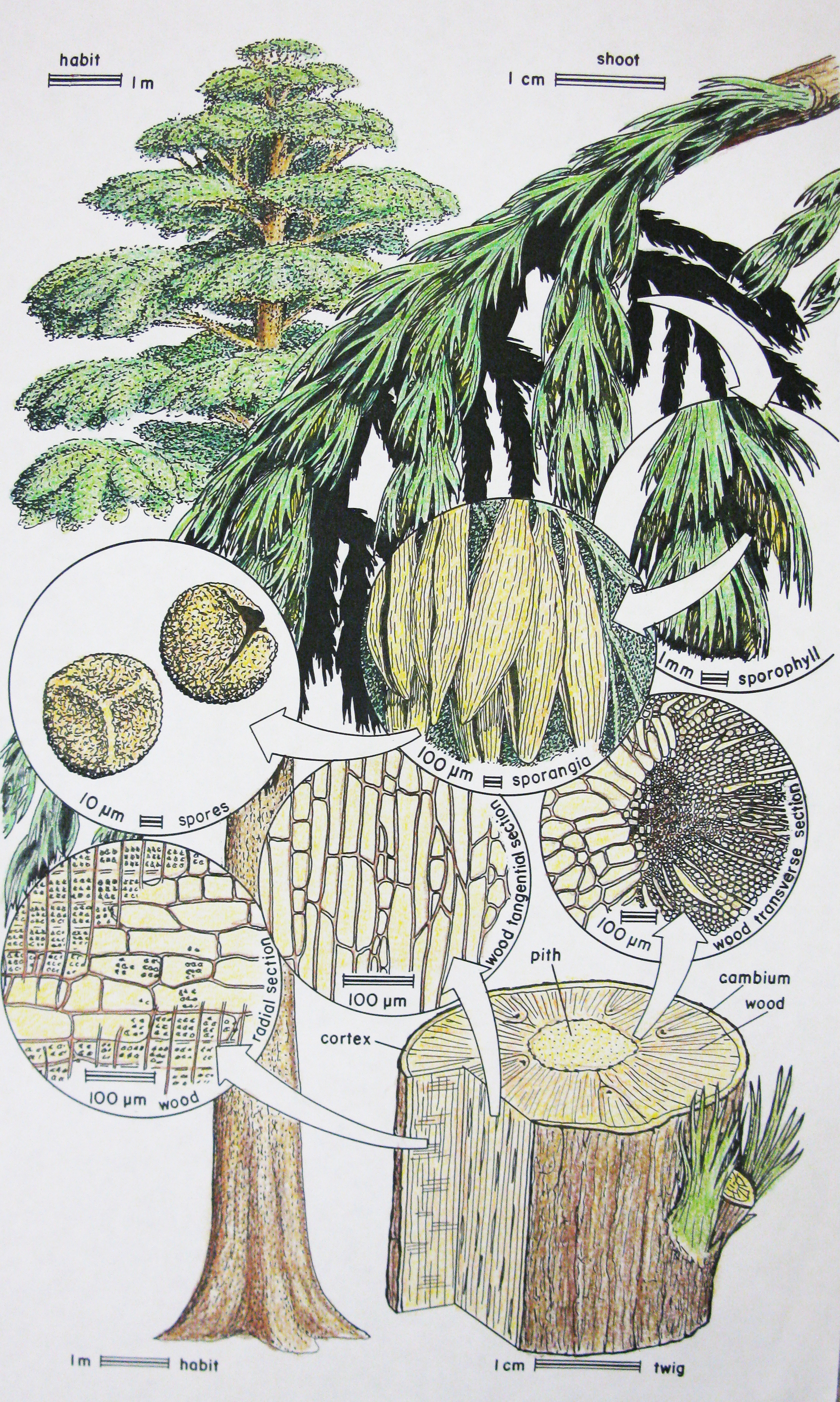
- Life restoration of the Late Devonian-Carboniferous tree Archaeopteris with insets detailing its anatomy
  †Archaeopteris
  - †Archaeopteris halliana
  - †Archaeopteris hibernica
  - †Archaeopteris macilenta
  - †Archaeopteris obtusa
  - †Archaeopteris sphenophyllifolia
- †Arctinurus
- Argyrotheca
- †Asaphus
- †Athyris
  - †Athyris spiriferoides
- †Atops
- †Atrypa
  - †Atrypa reticularis
- †Attercopus
  - †Attercopus fimbriunguis
  - †Attercopus fimbriungus
- †Aulatornoceras
- †Aulopora
  - †Aulopora microbuccinata
- †Aviculopecten
- †Bactrotheca – report made of unidentified related form or using admittedly obsolete nomenclature
- †Baltoceras
- †Barinophyton
- †Barrandeoceras
- †Bassleroceras
- †Bathydiscus
- †Bathyuriscus
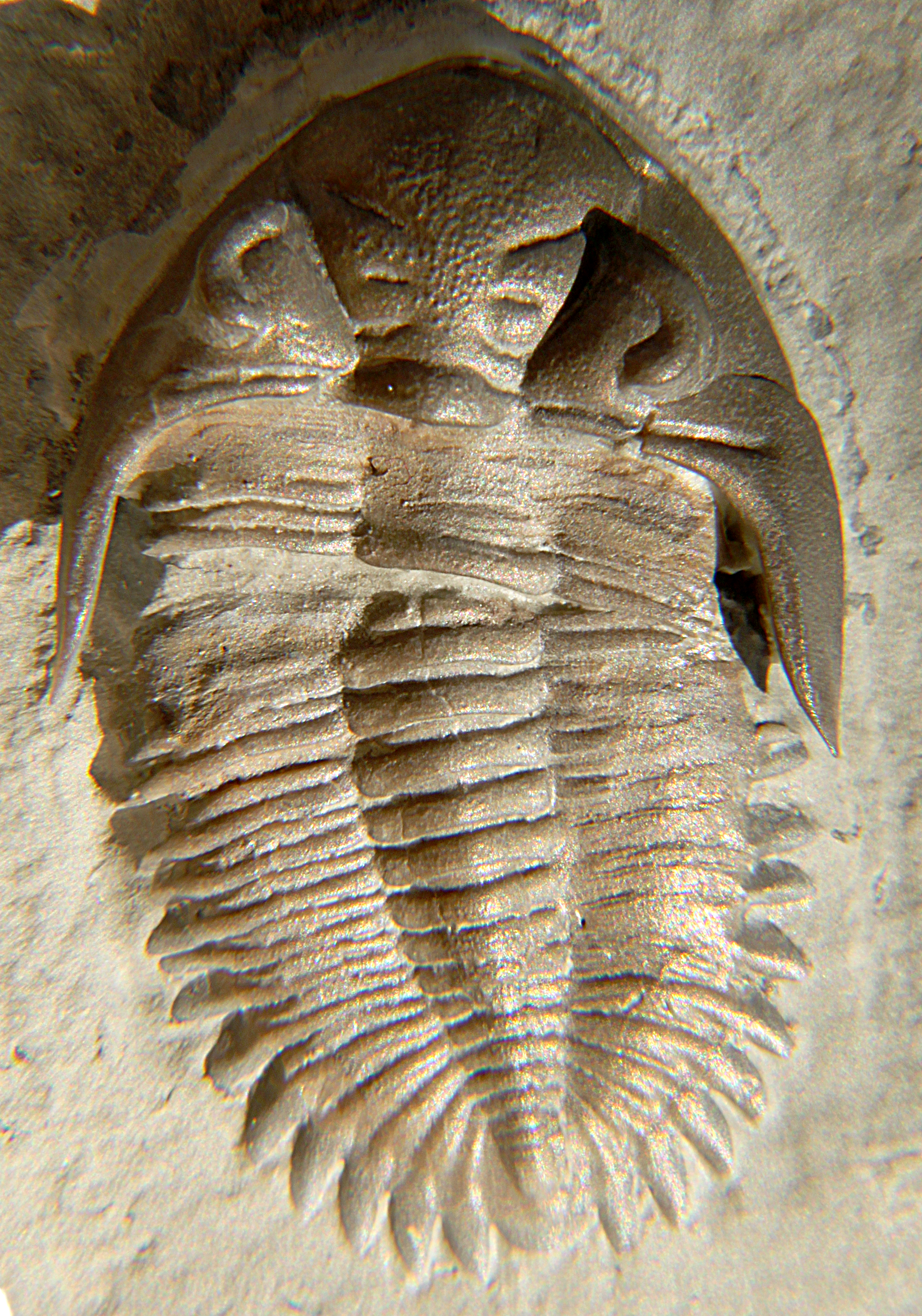
- Fossil of the Middle Devonian trilobite Bellacartwrightia
  †Bellacartwrightia
- †Bellerophon
- †Bembexia
- †Benthamaspis
- † Bertiella
- †Bolbocephalus
- †Bolboparia
- †Bolboporites
- †Botsfordia
- †Bowmania
- †Brachyopterus
- †Buffalopterus
- †Bumastus
  - †Bumastus ioxus
- †Bunaia
- †Callixylon
  - †Callixylon erianum
- †Calymene
  - †Calymene niagarensis
- †Calymenella
- †Calyptaulax
- †Camarotoechia
  - †Camarotoechia billingsi
  - †Camarotoechia litchfieldensis
  - †Camarotoechia neglecta
  - †Camarotoechia tethys
- †Cameroceras
- †Campbelloceras
- †Caninia
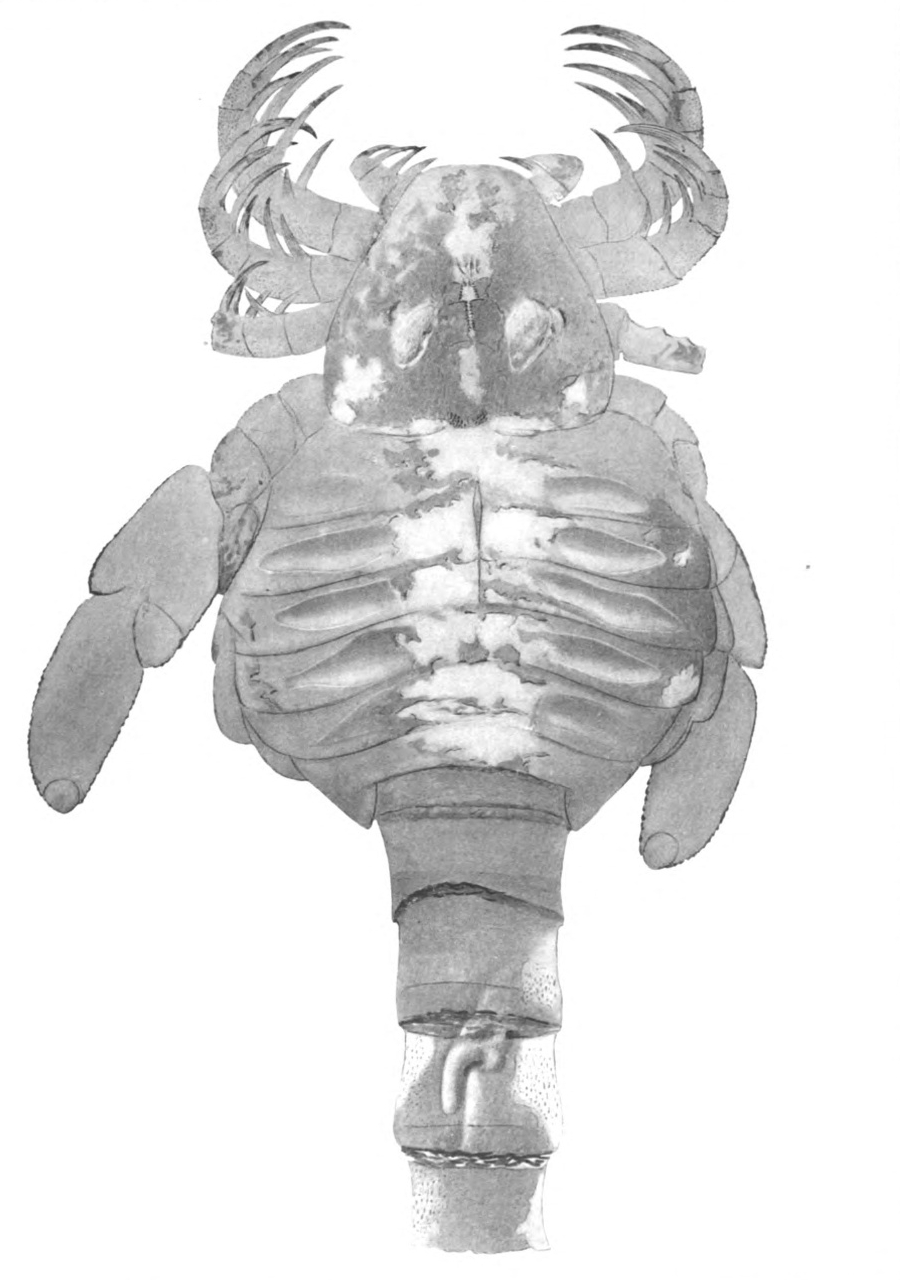
- Fossil of the Silurian eurypterid ("sea scorpion") Carcinosoma
  †Carcinosoma
- †Cardiograptus
- †Carniodus
- †Carolinites
- †Cartersoceras
- †Cassinoceras
- †Centroceras
- †Ceramopora
  - †Ceramopora imbricata
- †Ceratiocaris
- †Ceratocephala
- †Ceraurinella
- †Ceraurus
- †Chancelloria
- †Chasmatopora
- †Chazyoceras
- †Cheiloceras
- †Cheirurus
- †Chondrites
- †Chonetes
  - †Chonetes ensicosta
- †Christiania
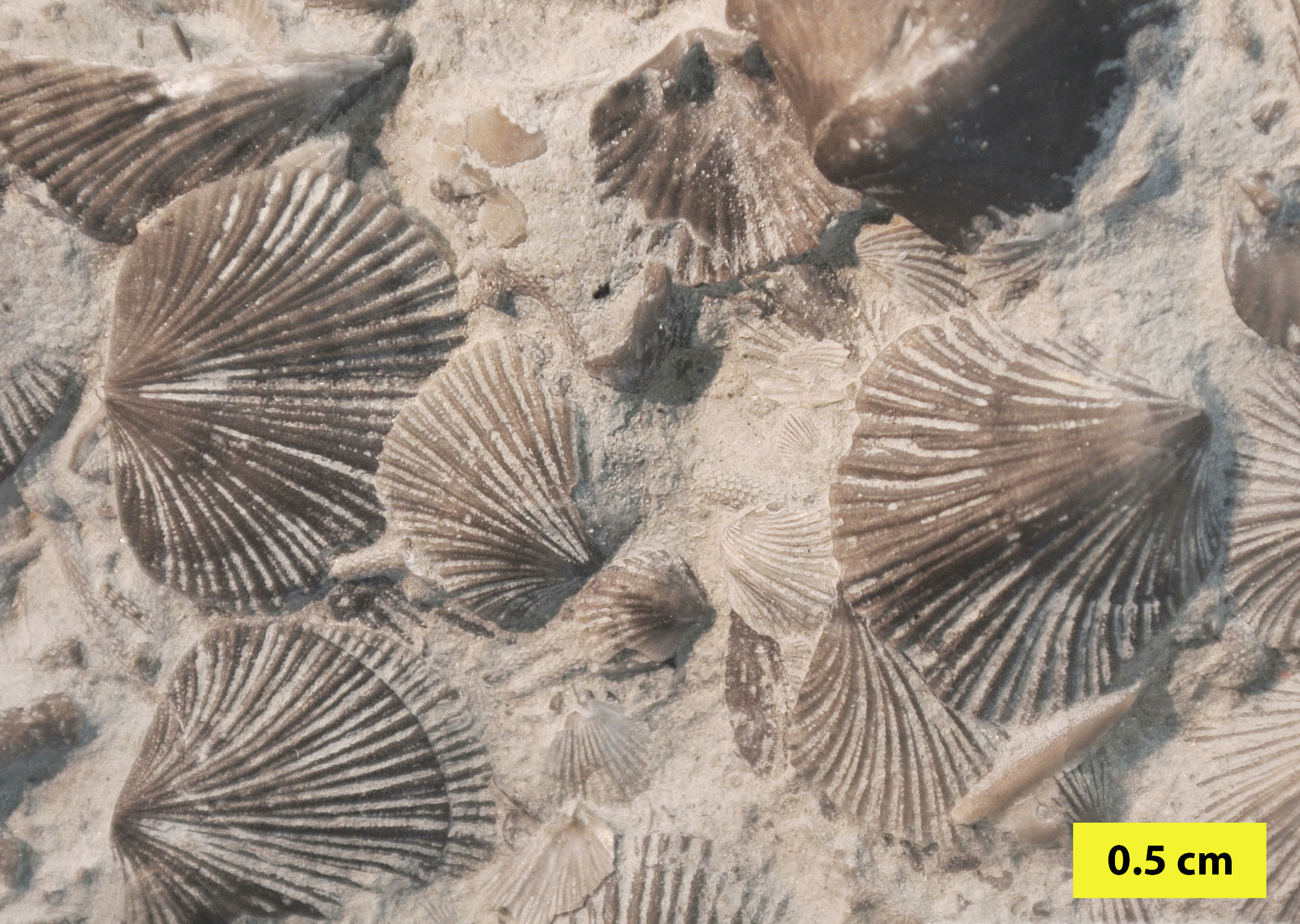
- Assemblage of fossilized shells of the Ordovician brachiopod Cincinnetina
  †Cincinnetina
  - †Cincinnetina multisecta
- †Cladochonus
- †Clarkeipterus
- †Clarkoceras
- †Climacograptus
- †Clitendoceras
- †Clorinda
- †Coenites
- †Columnaria
- †Conocardium
- †Conotheca
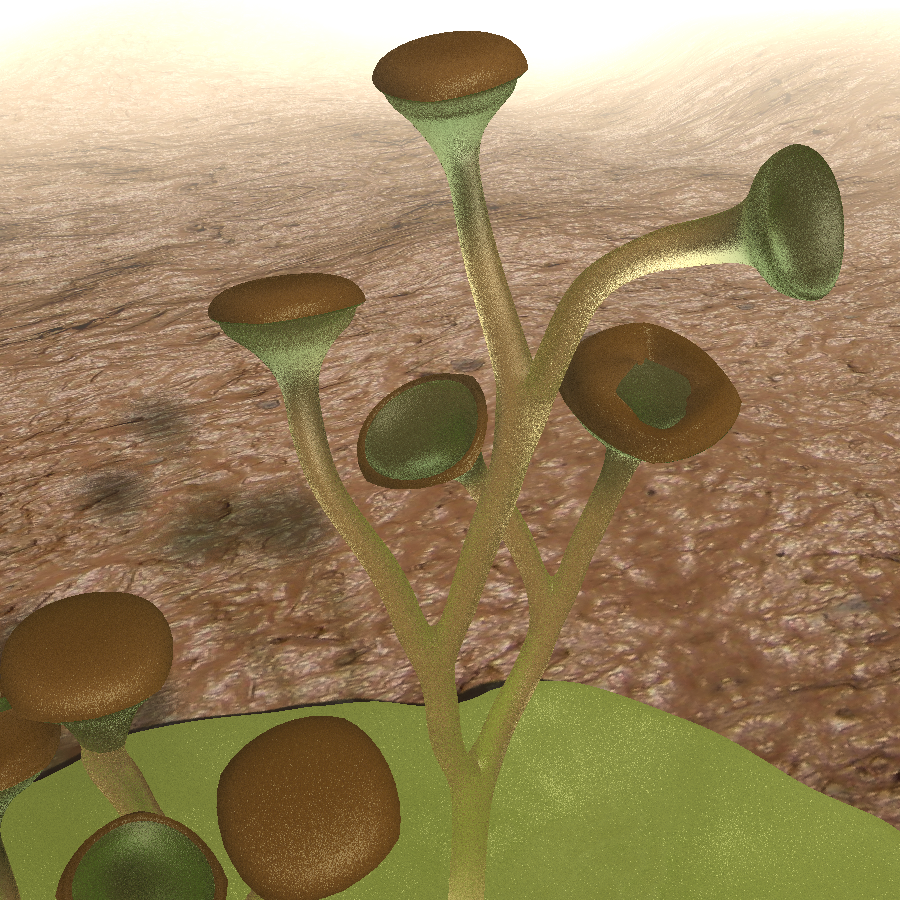
- Life restoration of the Silurian-Early Devonian primitive land plant Cooksonia
  †Cooksonia
- †Coolinia
- †Cordylodus
- †Cornulites
  - †Cornulites flexuosus
- †Cornuproetus
- †Cotteroceras
- Crania
- Craniella
- †Craniops
- †Crassotornoceras
- †Crinoid
- †Ctenopterus
- †Curtoceras
- †Cybele
- †Cyclonema
- †Cyphaspis
- †Cypricardinia
  - †Cypricardinia indenta
- †Cyrtobaltoceras
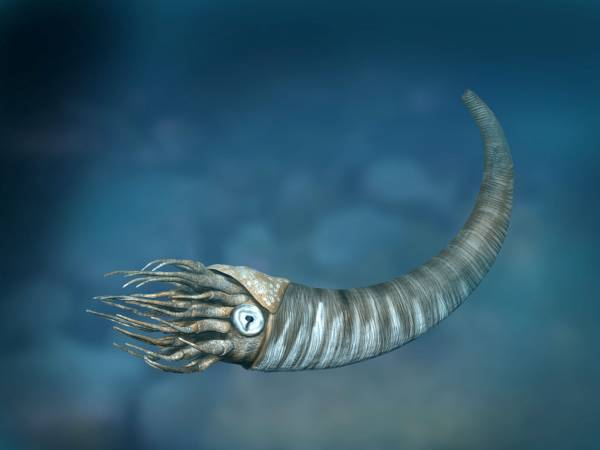
- Restoration of the Cambrian-Middle Devonian nautiloid cephalopod Cyrtoceras
  †Cyrtoceras
- †Cyrtolites
- †Cyrtospirifer
  - †Cyrtospirifer hornellensis
  - †Cyrtospirifer whitneyi
- †Dadoxylon
- †Dakeoceras
- †Dalmanites
  - †Dalmanites limulurus
- †Dalmanitina
- †Daonella
- †Decadocrinus
- †Deiphon
- †Dicoelosia
- †Dictyonema
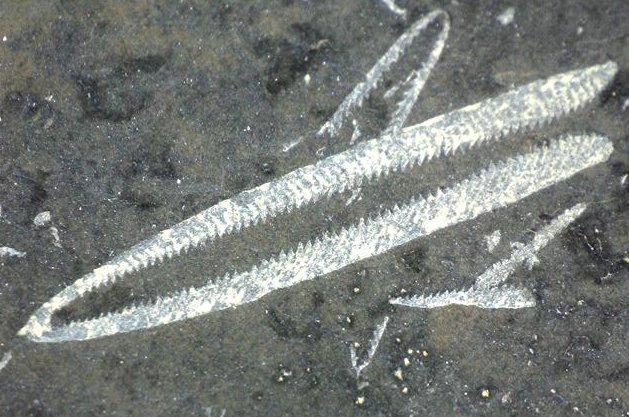
- Fossil of the Middle Ordovician graptolite Didymograptus
  †Didymograptus
- †Dikelocephalus
- †Dimerocrinites
- †Dipleura
- †Diplograptus
- Discina
- †Discinella
- †Discosorus
- †Distomodus
  - †Distomodus staurognathoides
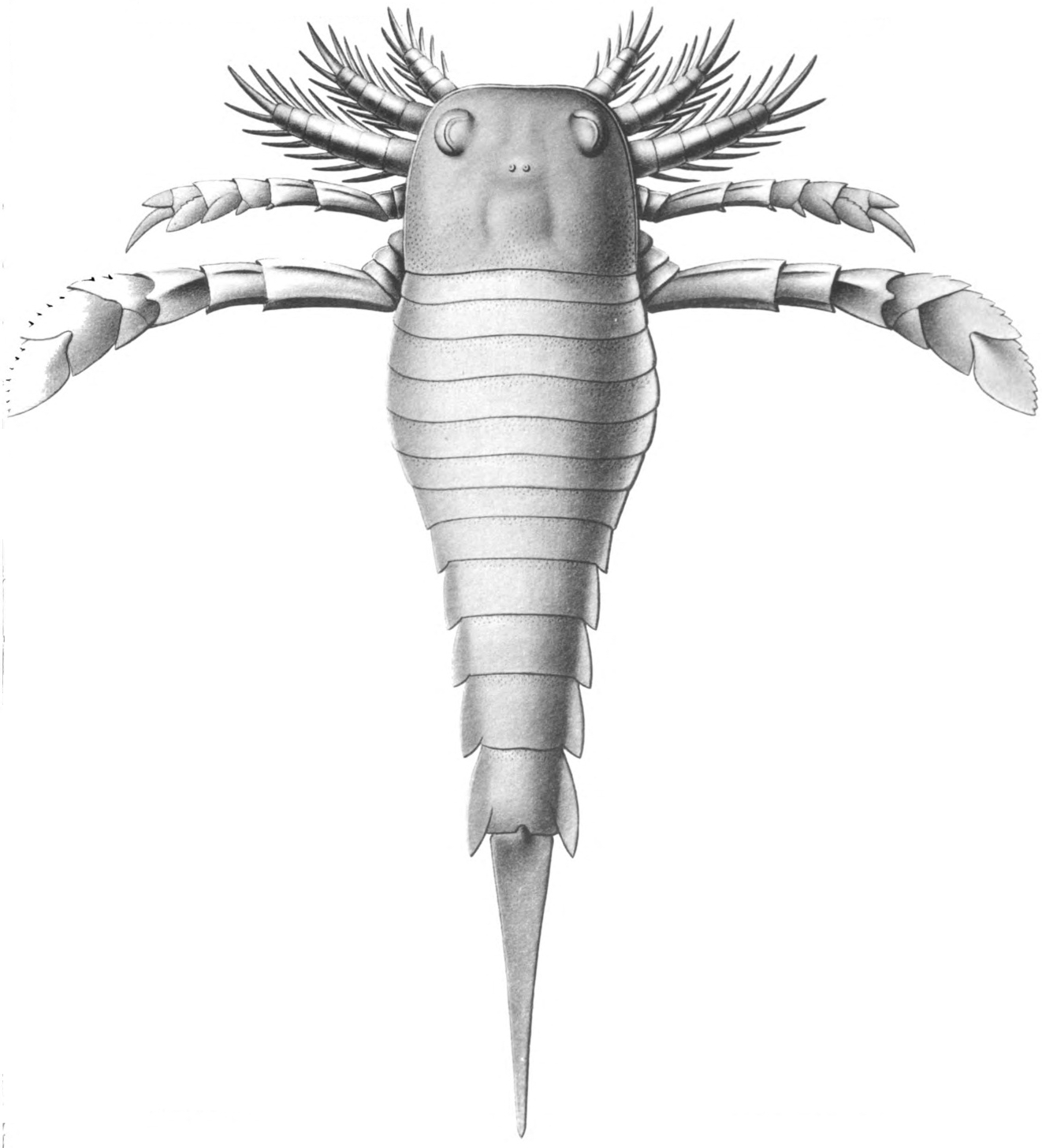
- Life restoration of the Silurian eurypterid ("sea scorpion") Dolichopterus
  †Dolichopterus
- †Dracochela – type locality for genus
  - †Dracochela deprehendor – type locality for species
- †Drepanophycus
  - †Drepanophycus spinaeformis
- †Eatonia
- †Ecdyceras
- †Ectenolites
- †Edmondia – tentative report
- †Eldredgeops
  - †Eldredgeops rana
- †Ellesmeroceras
- †Elliptocephala
- †Emmonsia
- †Encrinurus
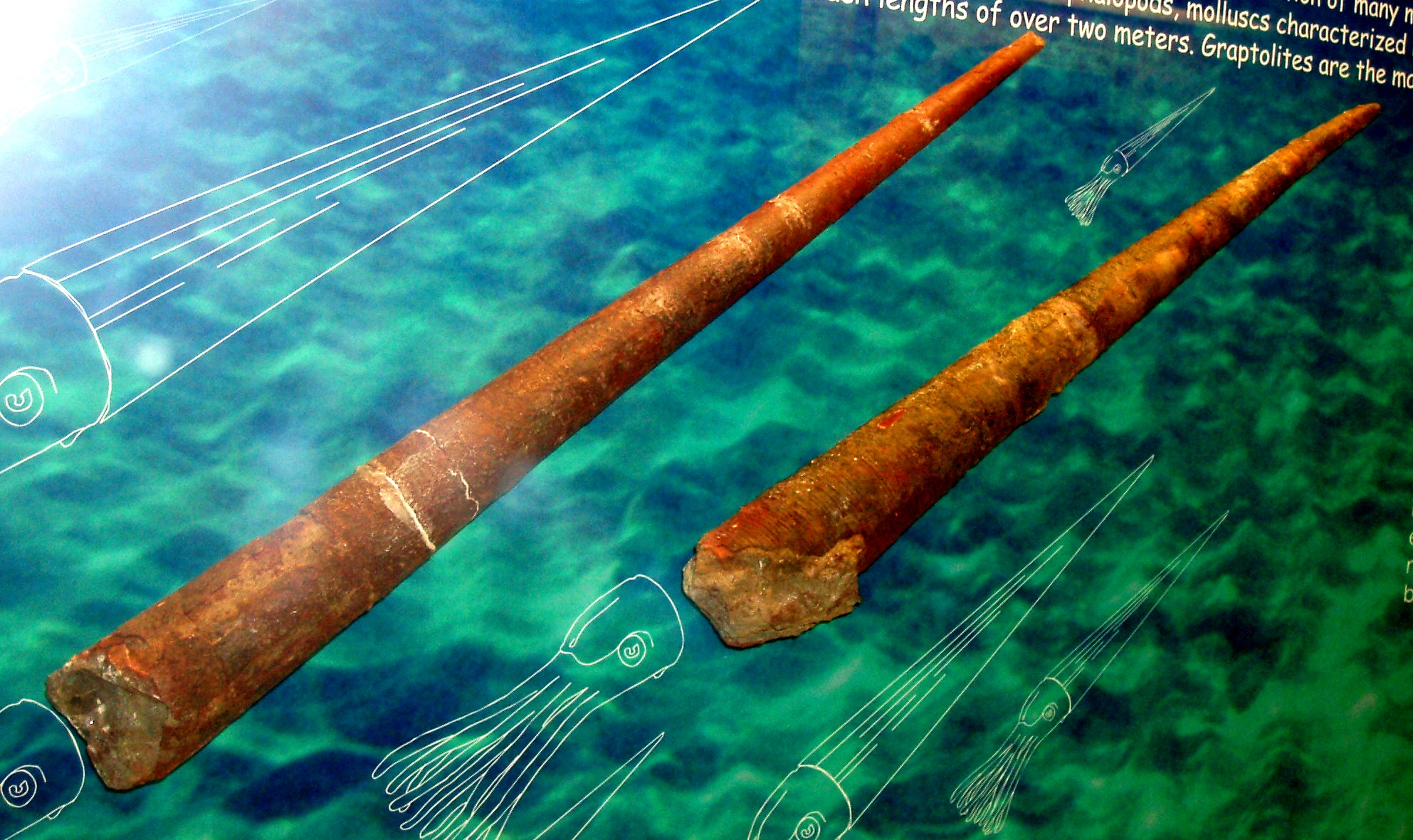
- Fossilized shells and restored appearances of the Middle-Late Ordovician nautiloid cephalopod Endoceras
  †Endoceras
- †Eoagnostus
- †Eoarthropleura – type locality for genus
- †Eodictyonella
- †Eospermatopteris
- †Eospirifer
  - †Eospirifer radiatus
- †Eotripteroceras
- †Eremoceras
- †Erettopterus
- †Erieopterus
- †Erratencrinurus
- †Eucalyptocrinites
  - †Eucalyptocrinites caelatus
- †Euomphalus
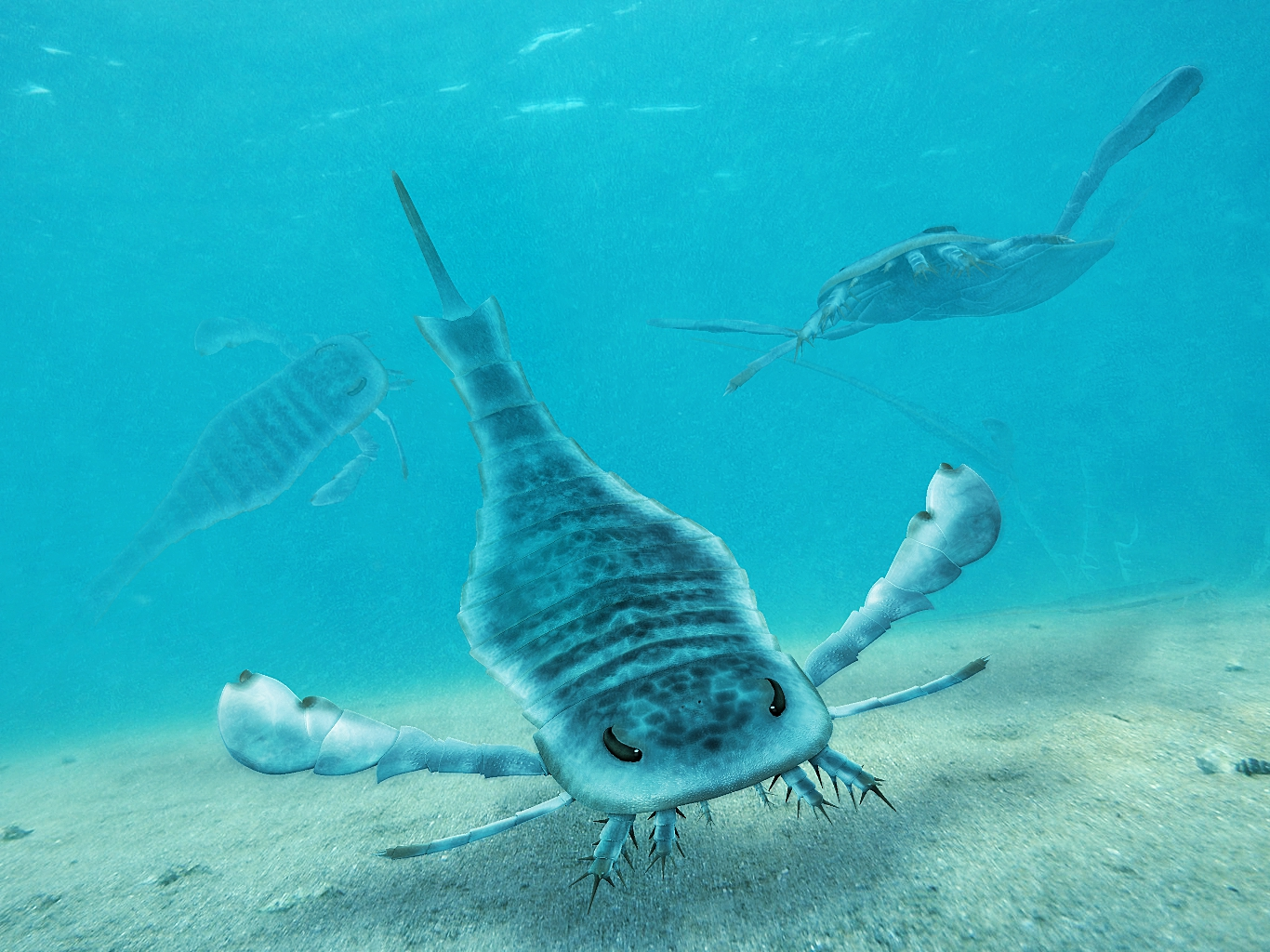
- Life restoration of Silurian eurypterid ("sea scorpion") Eurypterus
  †Eurypterus
  - †Eurypterus dekayi
  - †Eurypterus pittsfordensis
  - †Eurypterus remipes
- †Favosites
  - †Favosites biloculi
  - †Favosites emmonsi
  - †Favosites hisingeri
  - †Favosites limitaris
  - †Favosites niagarensis
  - †Favosites turbinatus
- †Fenestella
- †Fletcheria
- †Flexicalymene
  - †Flexicalymene senaria
- †Fordilla
- †Geisonoceras
- †Gilbertsocrinus
- †Glenisteroceras
- †Glyptocrinus
- †Goldringia
- †Gomphoceras
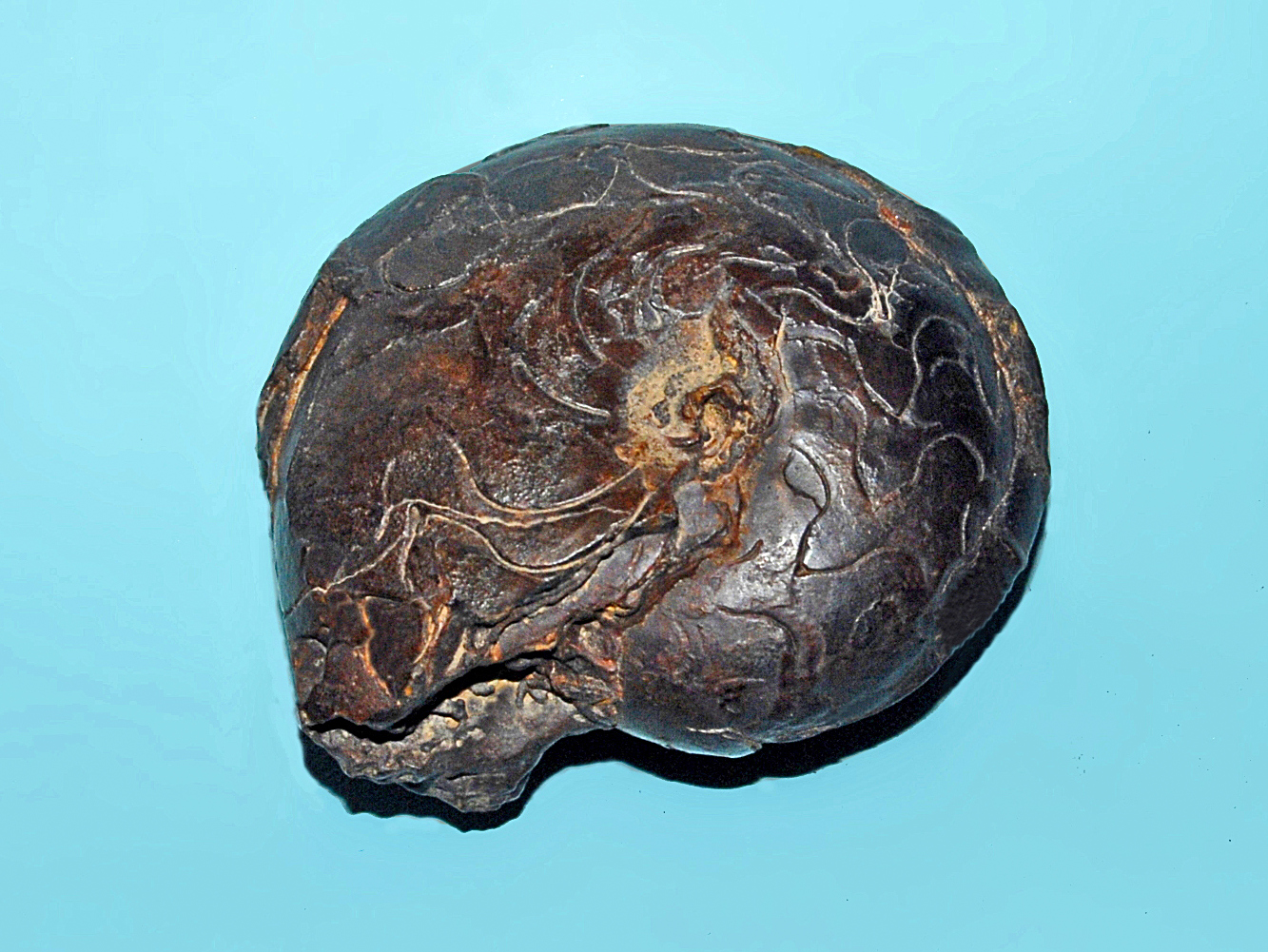
- Fossilized shell of the Late Devonian-Late Triassic ammonoid cephalopod Goniatites
  †Goniatites
- †Gonioceras
- †Goniograptus
- †Greenops
- †Grinnellaspis
- †Gyroceras
- †Halkieria
- †Hallipterus
- †Halloceras
- †Hallopora
  - †Hallopora elegantula
- †Halysites
  - †Halysites catenularia
- †Hardieopterus
- †Helcionella
- †Heliomeroides
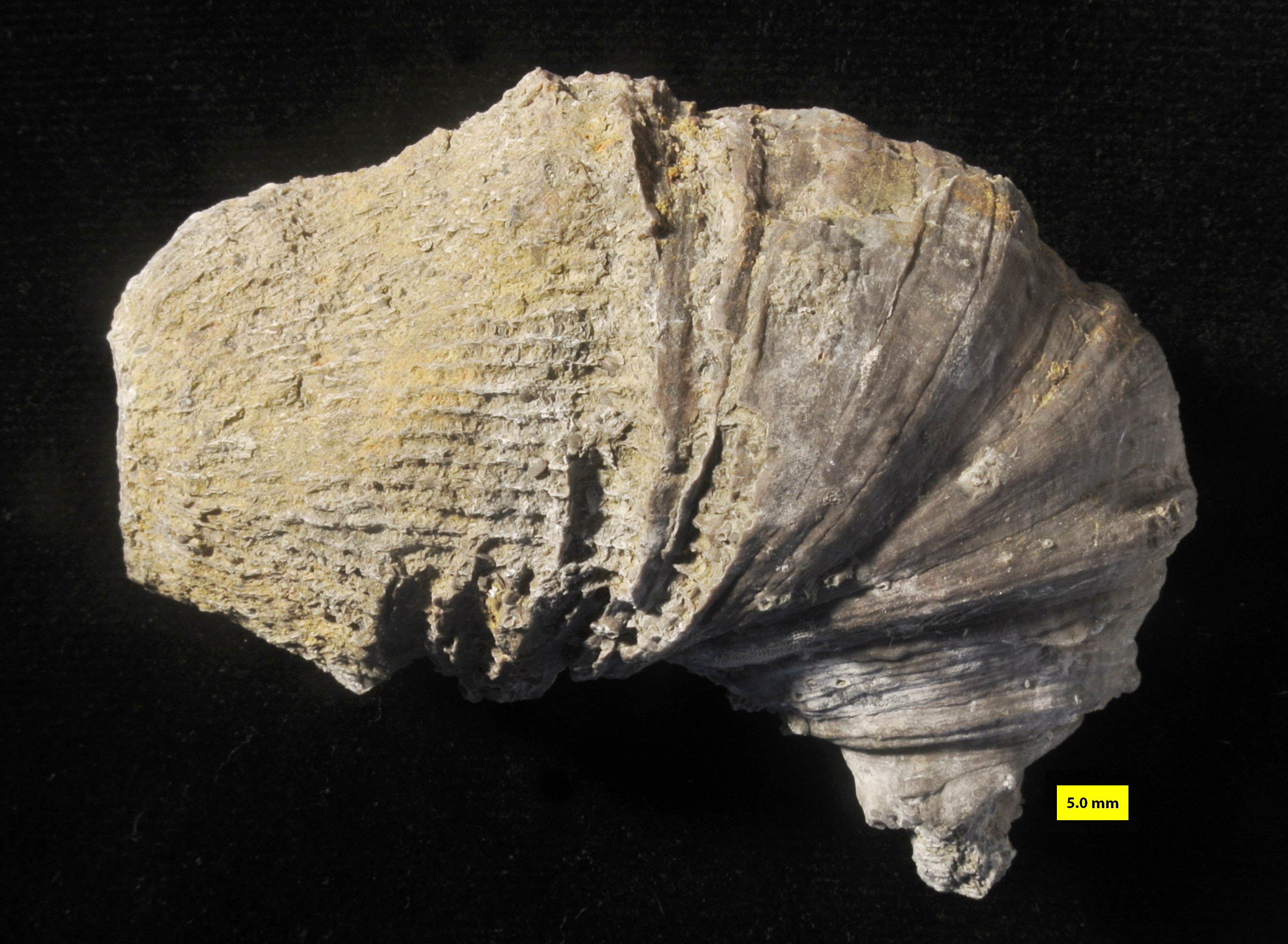
- Fossil of the Middle Devonian horn coral Heliophyllum
  †Heliophyllum
  - †Heliophyllum halli
- †Hemiaspis
- †Hemirhodon
- †Hepaticites
- †Hercynella
- †Hertzina
- †Hexameroceras
- †Hibbertia
- †Hindia
- †Holopea
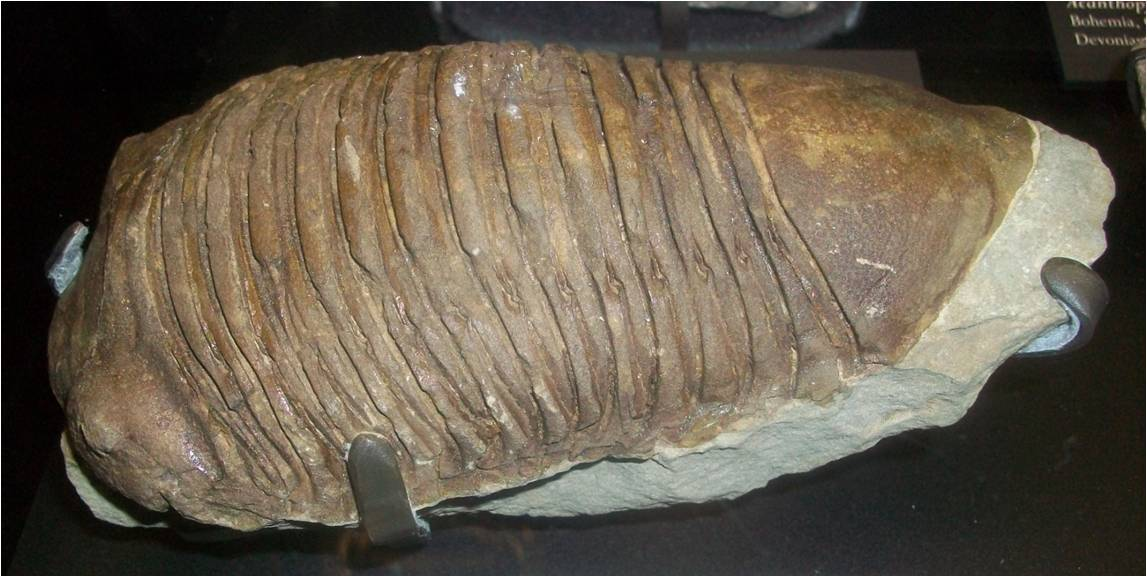
- Fossil of the Late Ordovician-Middle Devonian Homalonotus
  †Homalonotus
- †Hostinella
- †Hughmilleria
- †Hungerfordia
- †Hyolithellus
- †Hyolithes
- †Hypodicranotus
- †Ibyka
- †Icriodus
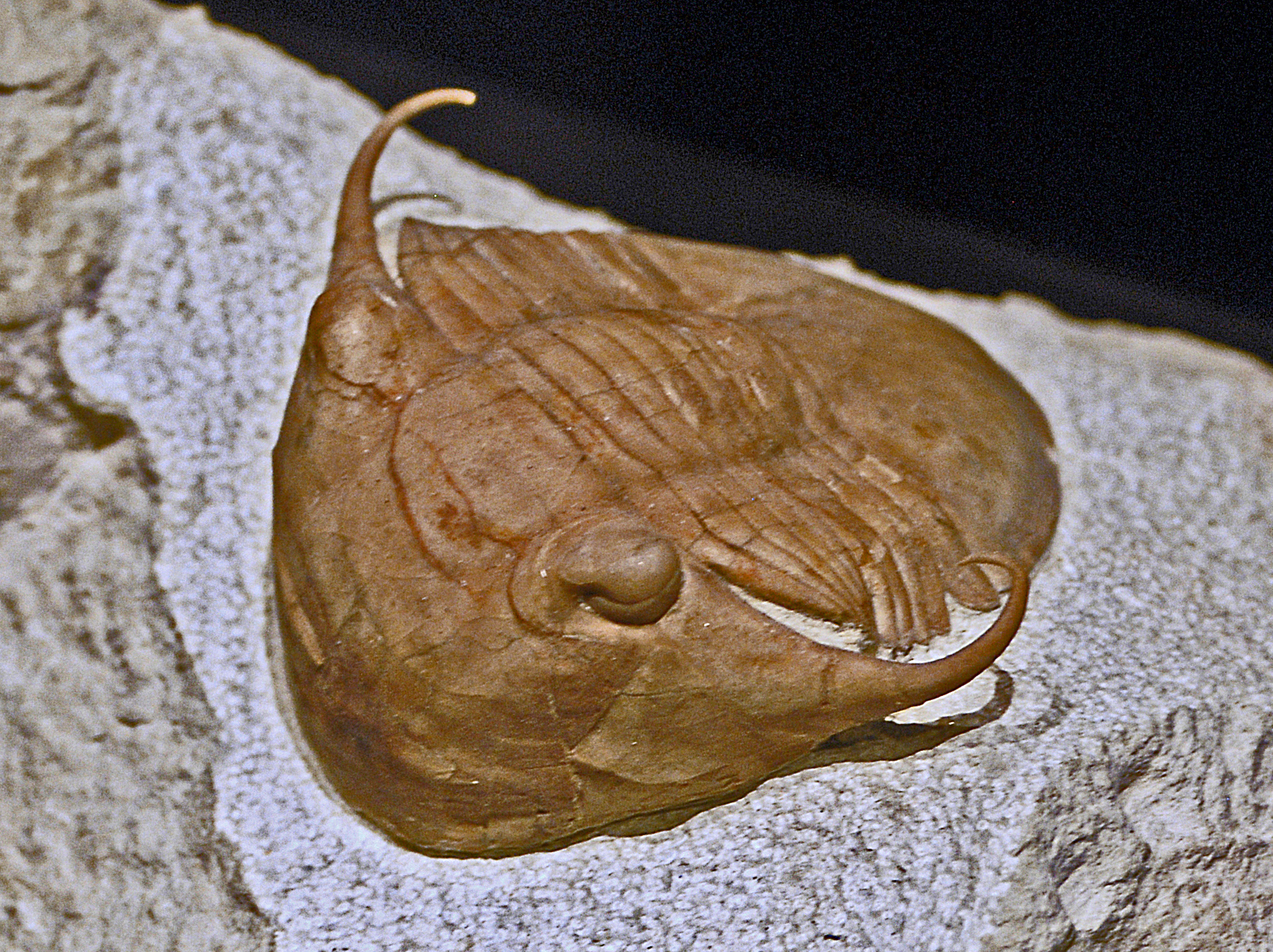
- Fossil of the Middle Ordovician trilobite Illaenus
  †Illaenus
- †Iocrinus
- †Isograptus
- †Isotelus
  - †Isotelus gigas
- †Kawina
- †Kiaeropterus
- †Kionoceras
- †Kockelella
- †Lapworthella
- †Lawrenceoceras
- †Leclercqia
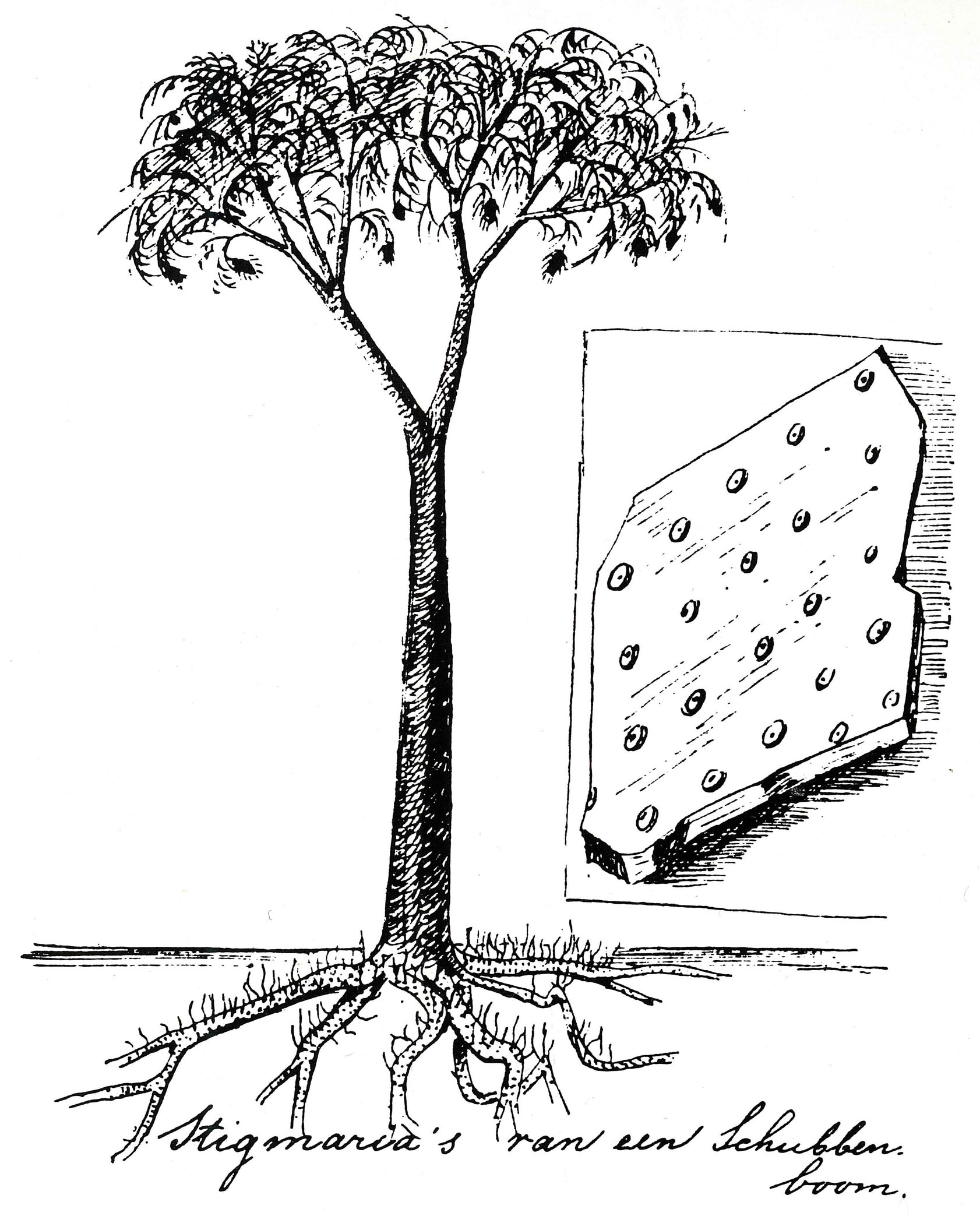
- Restoration of the Carboniferous-Late Triassic club moss relative Lepidodendron. Eli Heimans (1911).
  †Lepidodendron
- †Leptochilodiscus
- †Leptospira
- †Levisoceras
- †Limuloides – tentative report
- †Linguatornoceras
- †Linguella
- †Lingula
- †Lingulella
- †Lonchocephalus
- †Lonchodomas
  - †Luprisca incuba – type locality for species
- †Mackinnonia
- †Manticoceras
- †Marsupiocrinus
- †Matthevia
- †Mcqueenoceras
- †Meadowtownella
- †Medusagraptus
- †Meniscoceras
- †Meristella
  - †Meristella barrisi
- †Meristina
- †Metabaltoceras – type locality for genus
- †Metaplasia
- †Michelia
- †Michelinoceras
- †Microcyclus
- †Micromitra
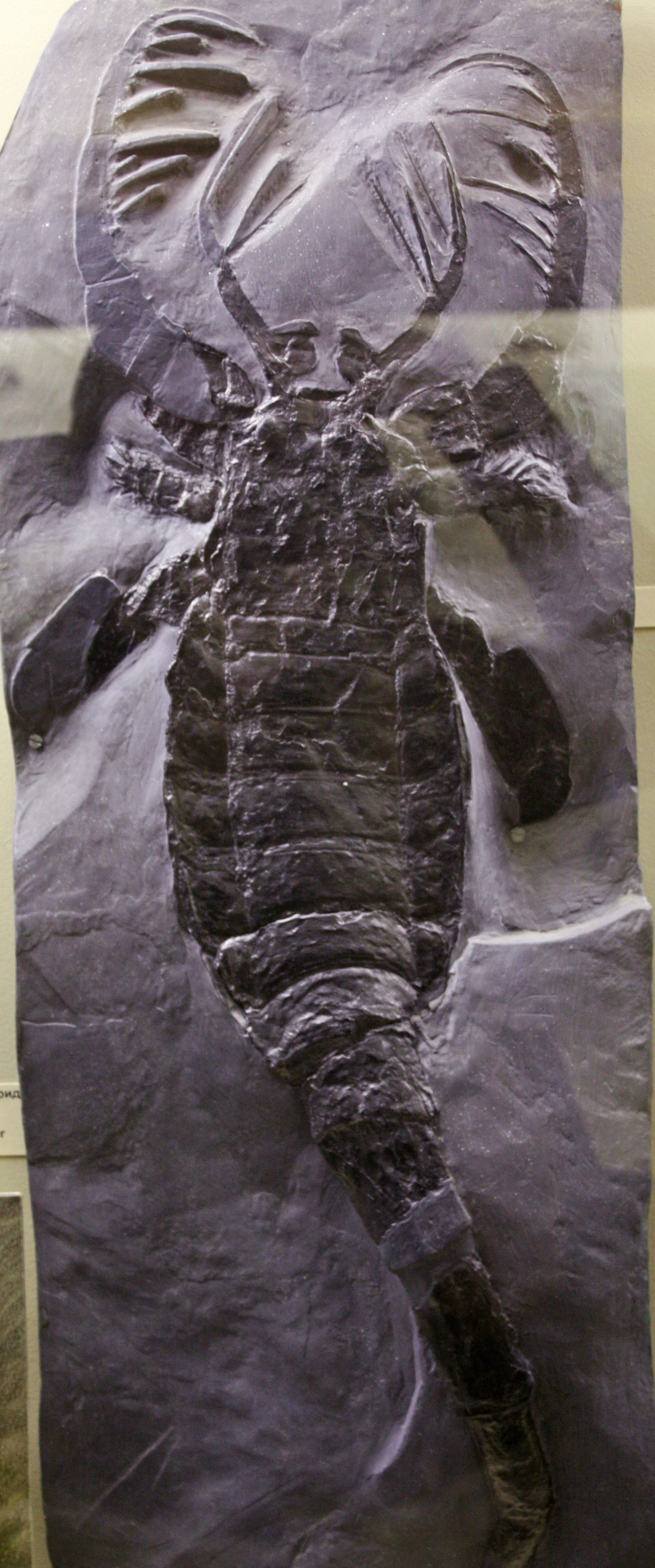
- Fossil of the Silurian eurypterid ("sea scorpion") Mixopterus
  †Mixopterus
  - †Mixopterus multispinosus
- †Monograptus
- †Moorea
- †Morania
- †Mucrospirifer
  - †Mucrospirifer mucronatus
- †Murchisonia
- †Nanahughmilleria
- †Nanno
- †Naticopsis
- †Niobe
- †Noeggerathia
- †Nowakia
- Nucula
- †Nuculoidea
- † Nyassa
- †Nybyoceras
- †Obolella
- †Obolus
- †Odontochile
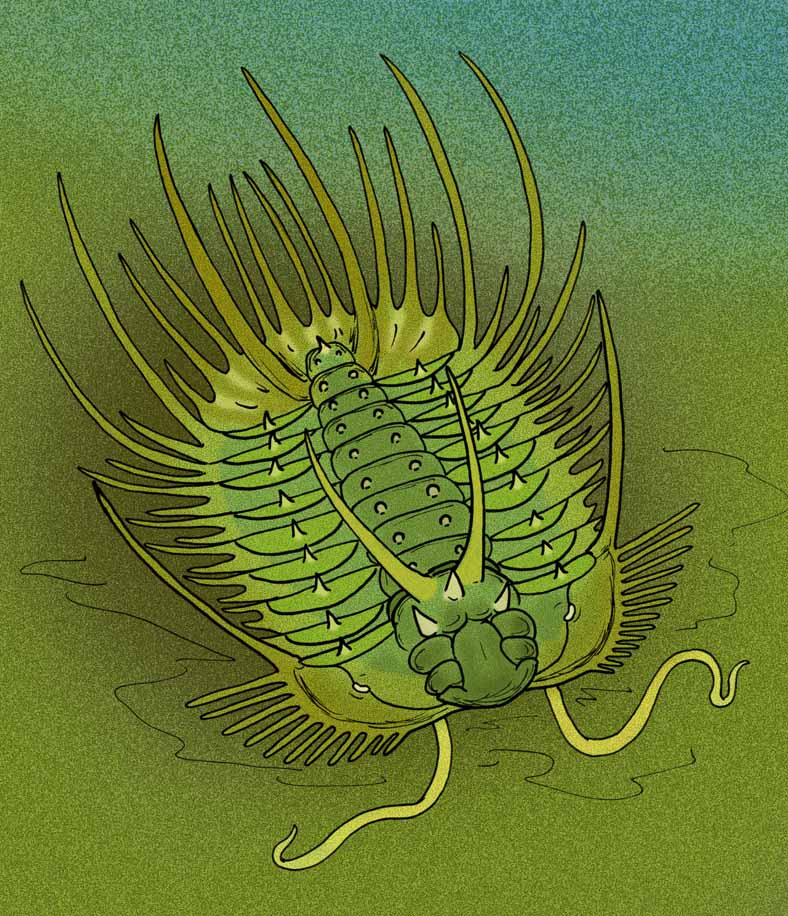
- Restoration of the Late Ordovician-Middle Devonian trilobite Odontopleura
  †Odontopleura
- †Olenellus
- †Olenoides
- †Oncoceras
- †Oonoceras
- †Ormoceras
- †Orthoceras
- †Oulodus
- †Ozarkodina
  - †Ozarkodina confluens
- †Pachyphyllum
- †Paciphacops
- †Paedeumias
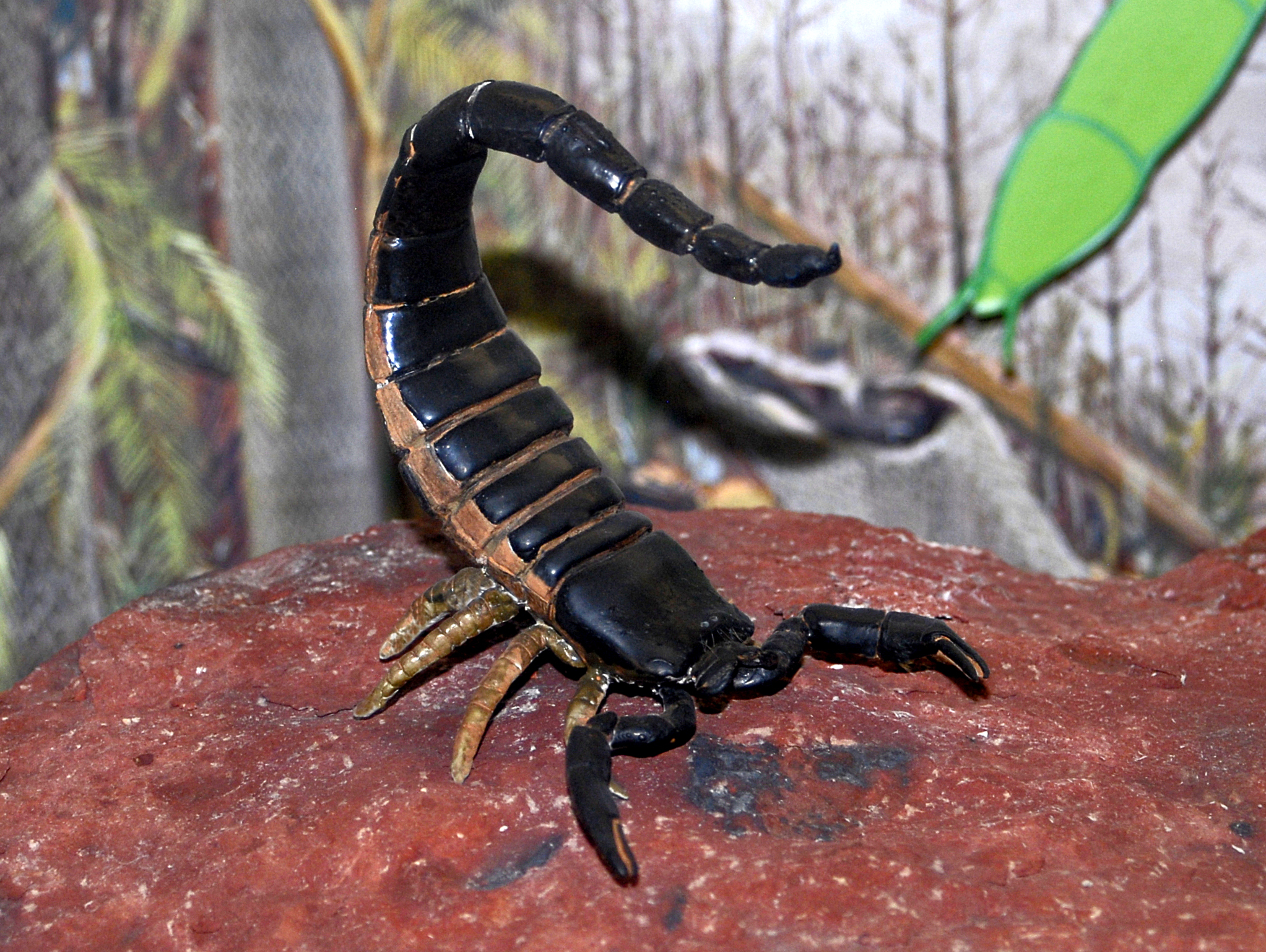
- Life restoration of the Silurian-Devonian scorpion Palaeophonus
  †Palaeophonus
- †Palmatolepis
  - †Palmatolepis triangularis
- †Panenka
- †Paracarcinosoma
- †Paraceraurus
- †Paradakeoceras
- †Parahughmilleria
- †Paraspirifer
- †Pelagiella
- †Pentagonia
- †Pentamerus
- †Periechocrinus
- †Periodon
- †Peronopsis
- †Phacops
  - †Phacops cristata
- †Phoenixites
- †Phragmolites
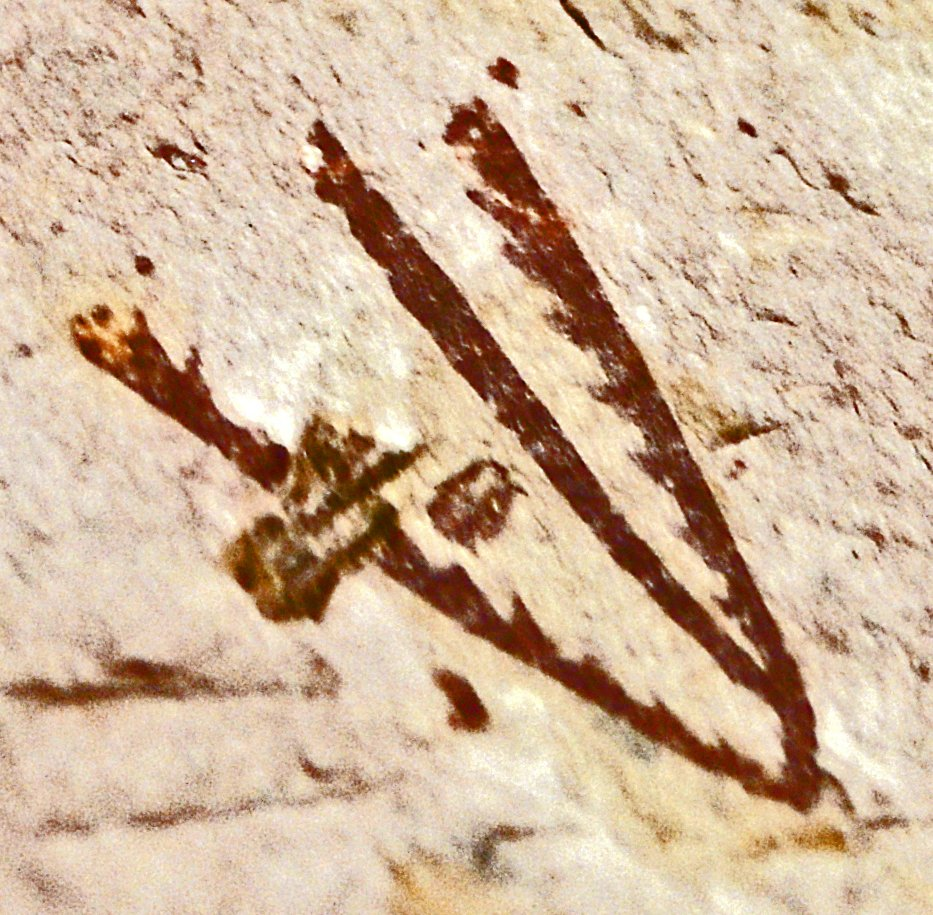
- Fossil of the Early Ordovician graptolite Phyllograptus
  †Phyllograptus
- †Phylloporina
- †Pittsfordipterus
- †Plaesiomys
- †Platyceras
  - †Platyceras carinatum
  - †Platyceras rarispinum
- †Platystrophia
- †Plectoceras
- †Plectodonta
- †Pleurodictyum
- Pleurotomaria
- †Pojetaia
  - †Pojetaia runnegari
- †Poleumita
- †Polygnathus
- †Proetus
- †Proscorpius – type locality for genus
- †Proterocameroceras
- †Pseudoniscus
- †Psilophyton
- †Pterospathodus
  - †Pterospathodus amorphognathoides
- †Pterotheca
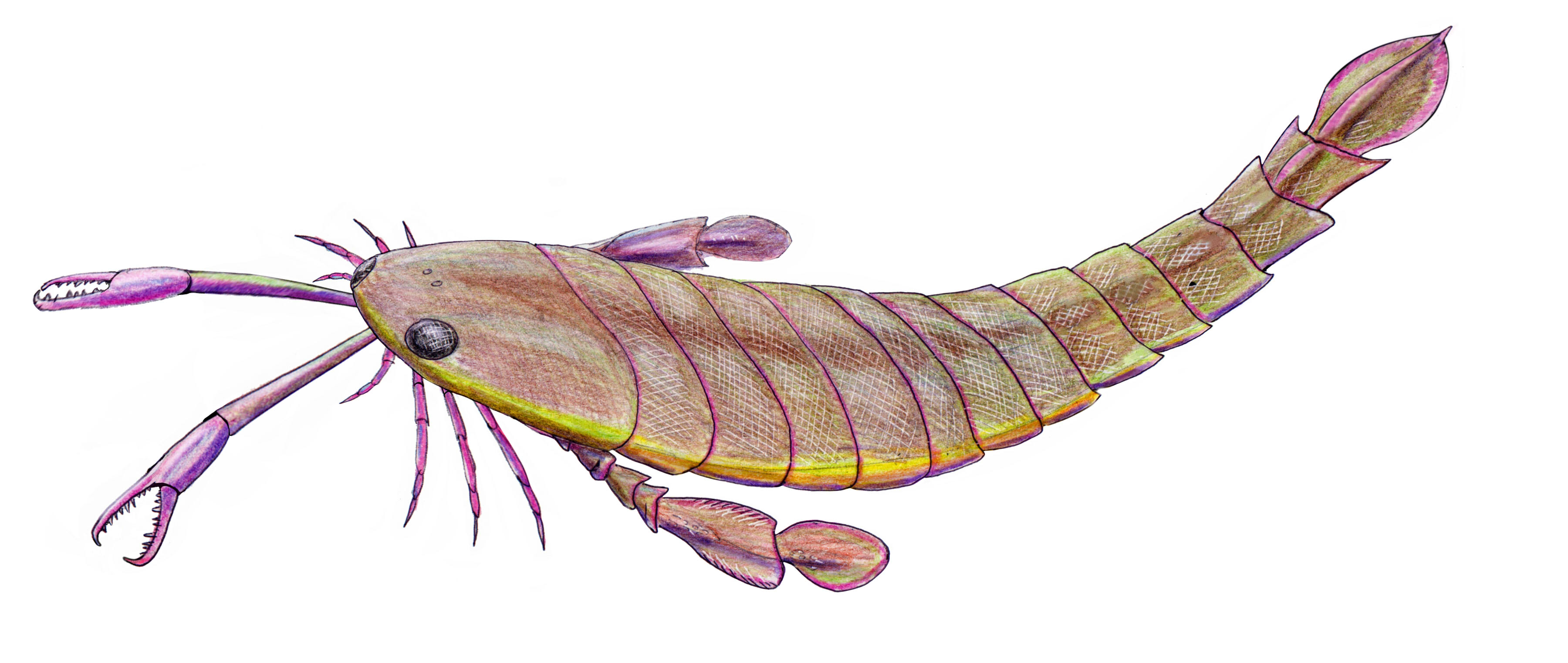
- Life restoration of the Silurian-Middle Devonian eurypterid ("sea scorpion") Pterygotus
  †Pterygotus
- †Ptychagnostus
- †Ptychoparia
- †Pyronema
- †Quasillites
- †Receptaculites
- †Remopleurides
- †Rensselaeria
- †Reteocrinus
- †Rhinocarcinosoma
- †Rhynchonella
- †Ribeiria
- †Rimouskia
- †Rossodus
- †Ruedemannipterus
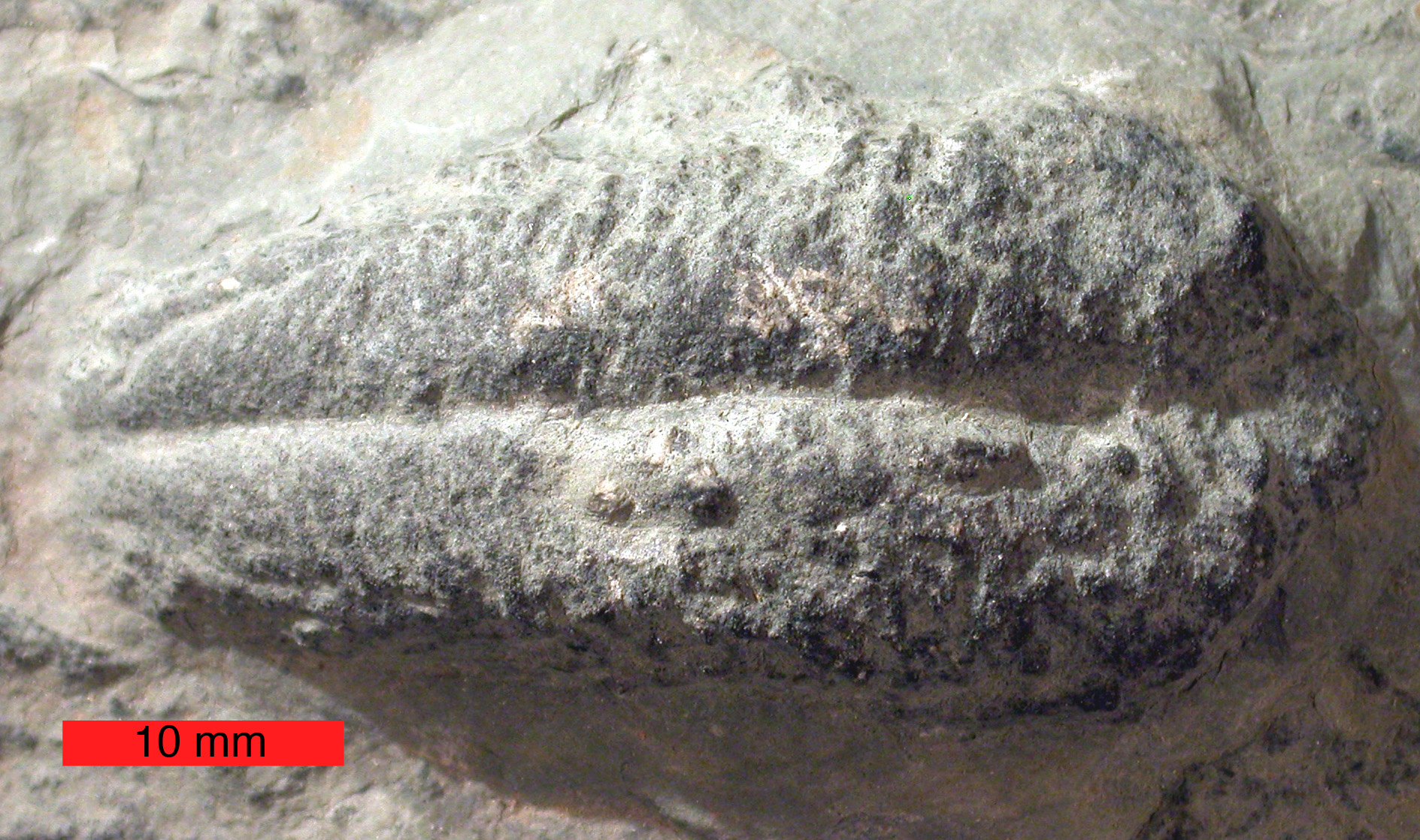
- Fossil of the arthropod burrow ichnogenus Rusophycus
  †Rusophycus
- †Sawdonia
- †Scenella
  - †Scenella montrealensis
  - †Scenella pretensa
- †Schizo (genus)
- †Scutellum
- Serpula
- †Serrodiscus
- †Serrulacaulis
- †Sigillaria
- †Skenidioides
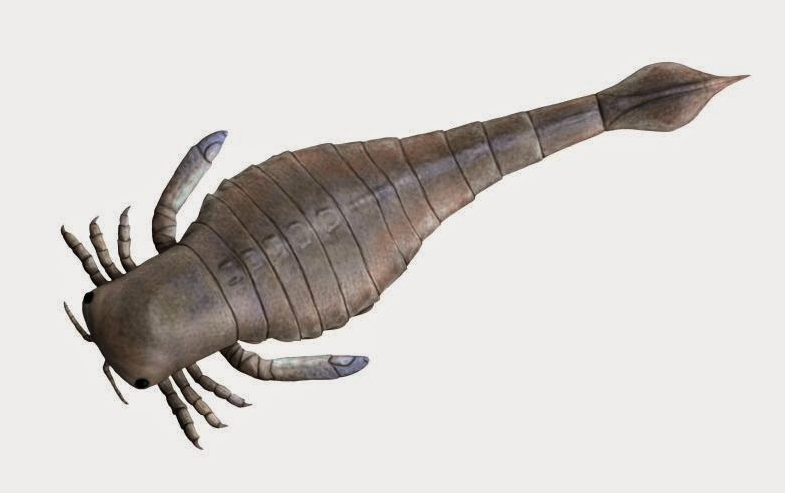
- Life restoration of the Silurian eurypterid ("sea scorpion") Slimonia
  †Slimonia
- †Solenopora
  - †Solenopora compacta
- †Sowerbyella
- †Sphaerexochus
- †Sphaerocoryphe
- †Spirifer
- †Spirophyton
- †Spiroraphe
- Spirorbis
- †Spyroceras
- †Stigmatella
- †Strepsodiscus
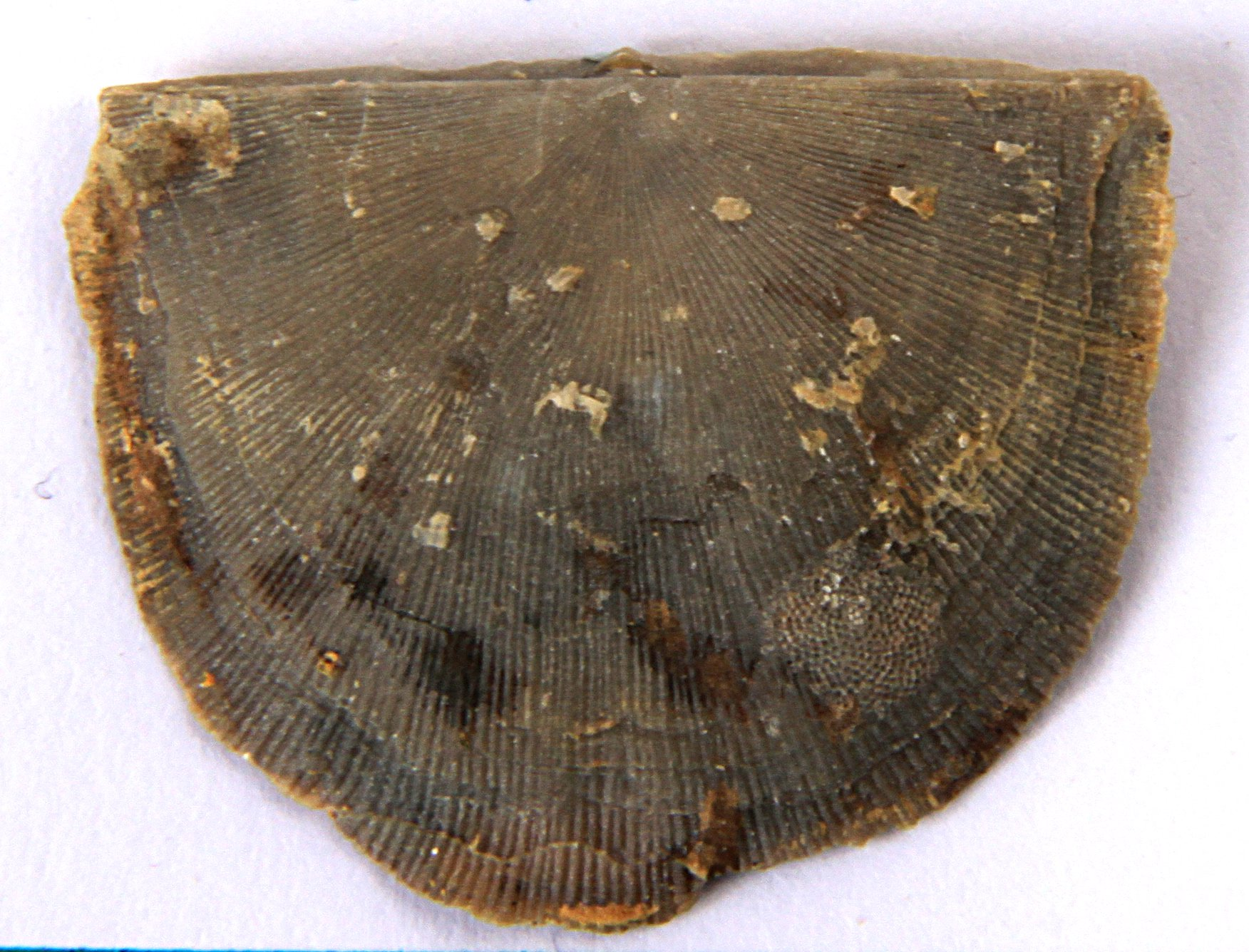
- Fossilized shell of the Ordovician-Silurian brachiopod Strophomena
  †Strophomena
  - †Strophomena crassa
  - †Strophomena incurvata
  - †Strophomena pentagonia
- Stylaraea
- †Stylonema
- †Stylonurus
- †Subligaculum
- †Subulites
- †Suecoceras
- †Syringopora
- †Taeniocrada
- †Tarphyceras
- †Tentaculites
- †Tetradium
- †Tetraxylopteris
- †Tornoceras
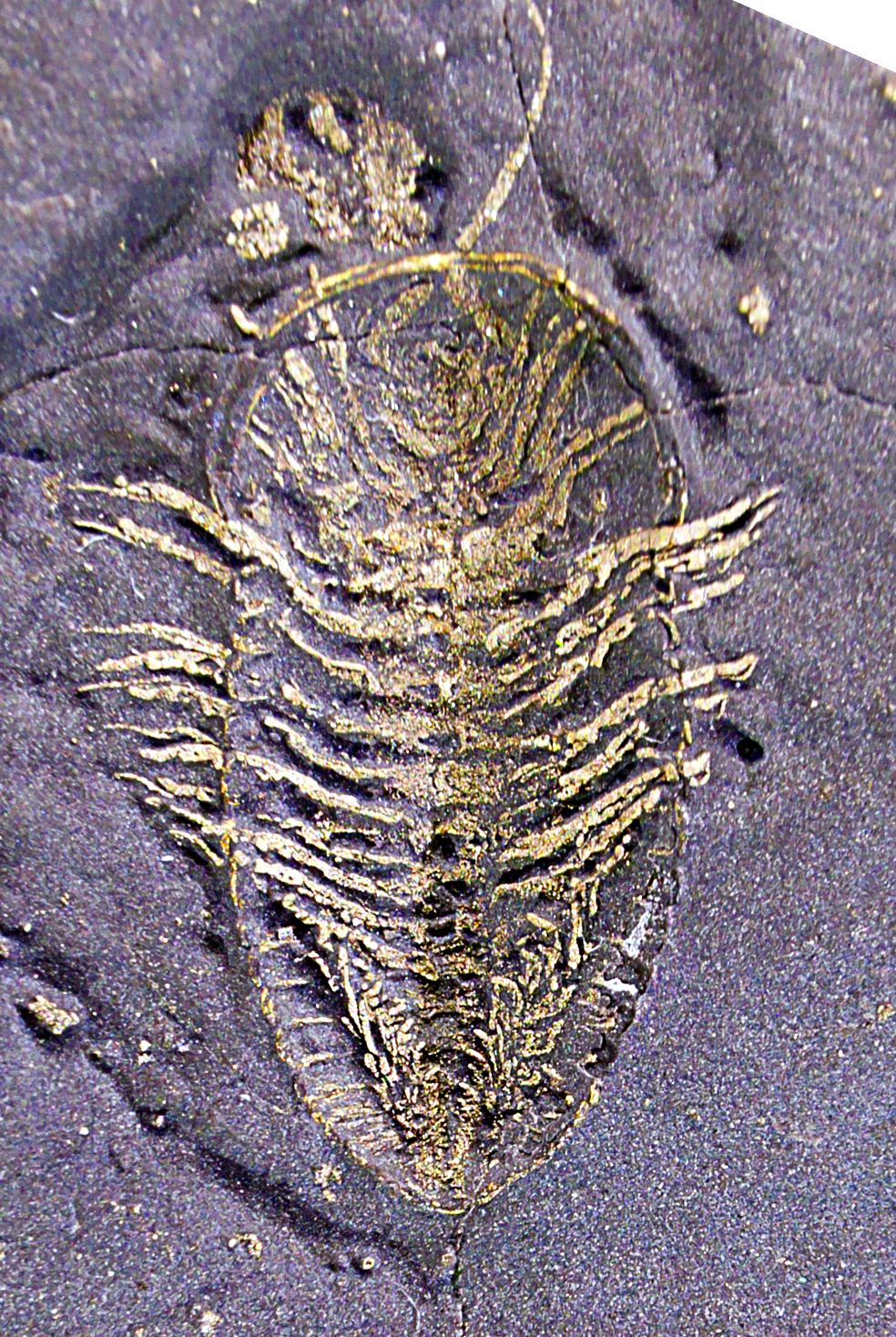
- Fossil preserving limbs and antennae as pyrite (fool's gold) of the underside of the Late Ordovician trilobite Triarthrus
  †Triarthrus
  - †Triarthrus eatoni
- †Triendoceras
- †Trimerus
- †Trochoceras
- †Trocholites
- †Truyolsoceras
- †Tryblidium
- †Valcouroceras
- †Variabiloconus
  - †Variabiloconus bassleri
- †Waeringopterus
- †Walcottoceras
- †Whitfieldia – tentative report
- †Wurmiella
  - †Wurmiella excavata
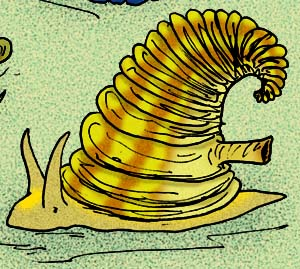
- Life restoration of the probable Cambrian mollusc Yochelcionella
  †Yochelcionella
- † Yorba
- †Zittelloceras
- †Zoophycos

== Mesozoic ==
- †Apatopus
  - †Apatopus lineatus
- †Atreipus – tentative report
- †Brachychirotherium – tentative report
- †Chirotherium
  - †Chirotherium lulli
  - †Chirotherium parvum
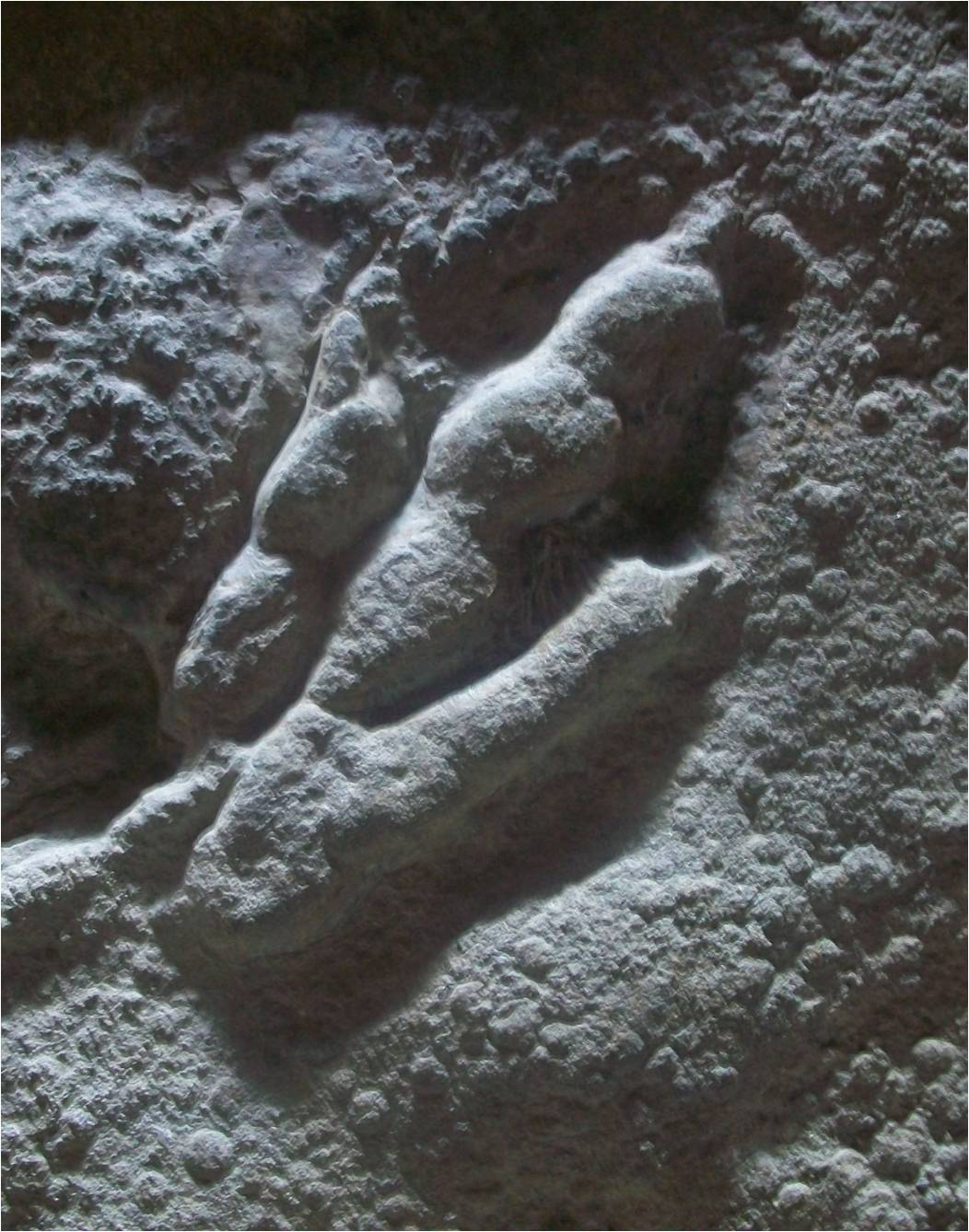
- Fossil negative with skin impressions of the theropod dinosaur footprint ichnogenus Grallator
  †Grallator
- †Rhynchosauroides
  - †Rhynchosauroides hyperbates – or unidentified comparable form

== Cenozoic ==
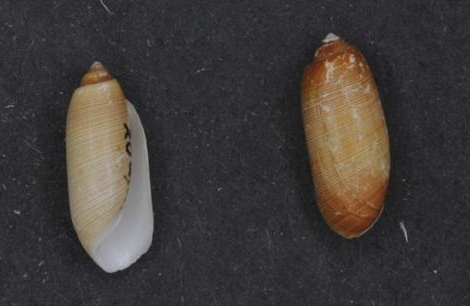
- Shells of Acteocina barrel-bubble sea snails
  Acteocina
  - †Acteocina canaliculata
- †Adeorbis
  - †Adeorbis supranitidis
- Ammonia
  - †Ammonia beccarii
- Anadara
  - †Anadara ovalis
  - †Anadara transversa
- Anomia
  - †Anomia simplex
- Arctica
  - †Arctica islandica
- Argopecten
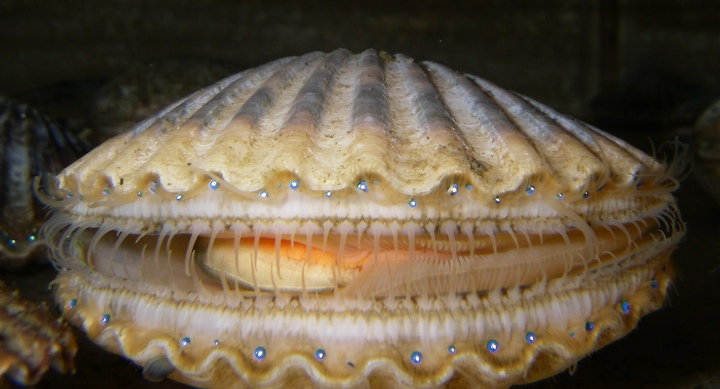
  - A living Argopecten irradians (formerly Aequipecten irradians), or Atlantic bay scallop
    †Argopecten irradians
- Astarte
  - †Astarte castanea
  - †Astarte elliptica
- Astrangia
  - †Astrangia danae
- Astyris
  - †Astyris lunata
- Boonea
  - †Boonea seminuda
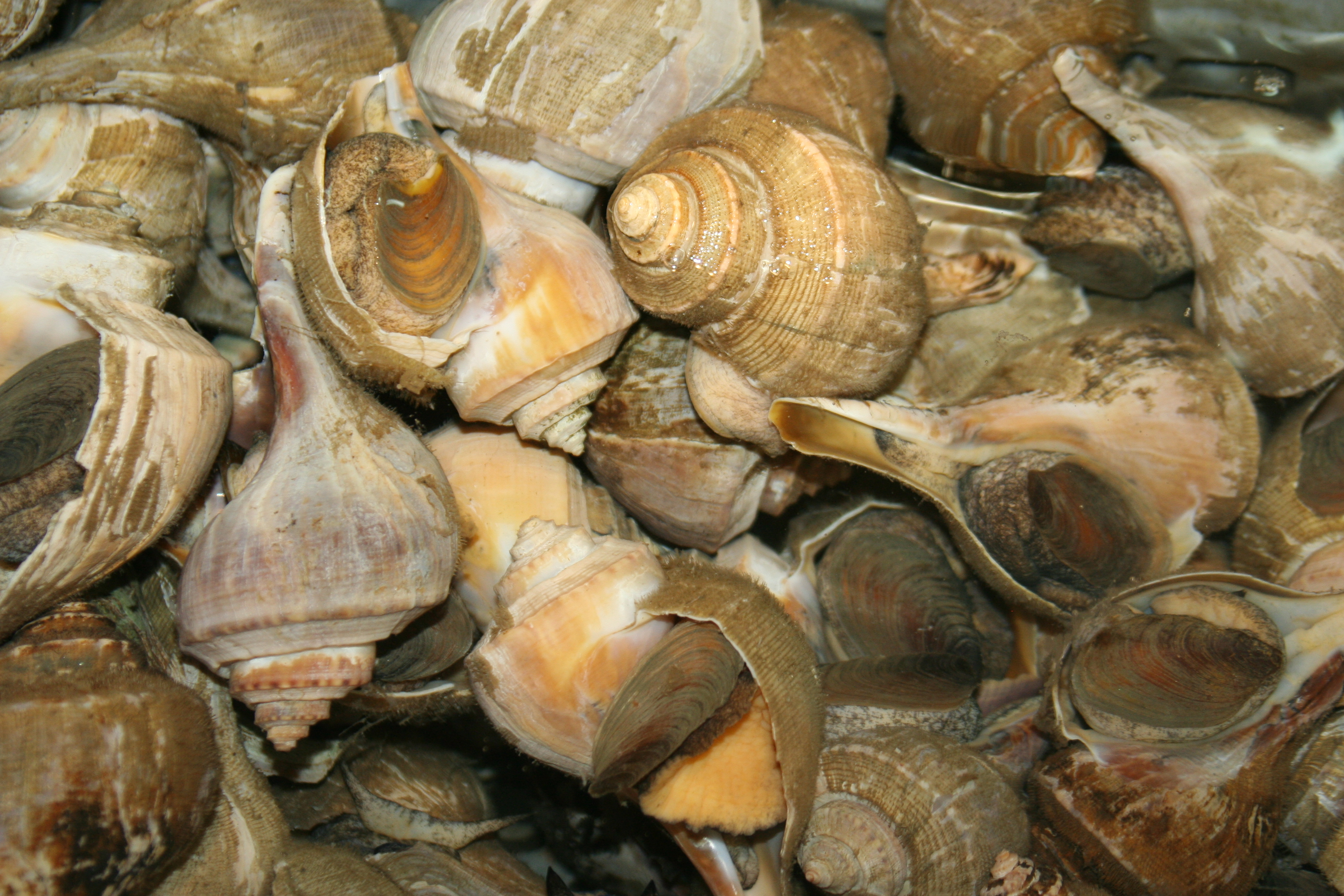
- Living Busycotypus whelk sea snails
  Busycotypus
  - †Busycotypus canaliculatus
- Caecum
  - †Caecum pulchellum
- †Canodona
- Caryocorbula
  - †Caryocorbula caribaea
- Cerithiopsis
  - †Cerithiopsis emersonii
- Chlamys
  - †Chlamys islandica
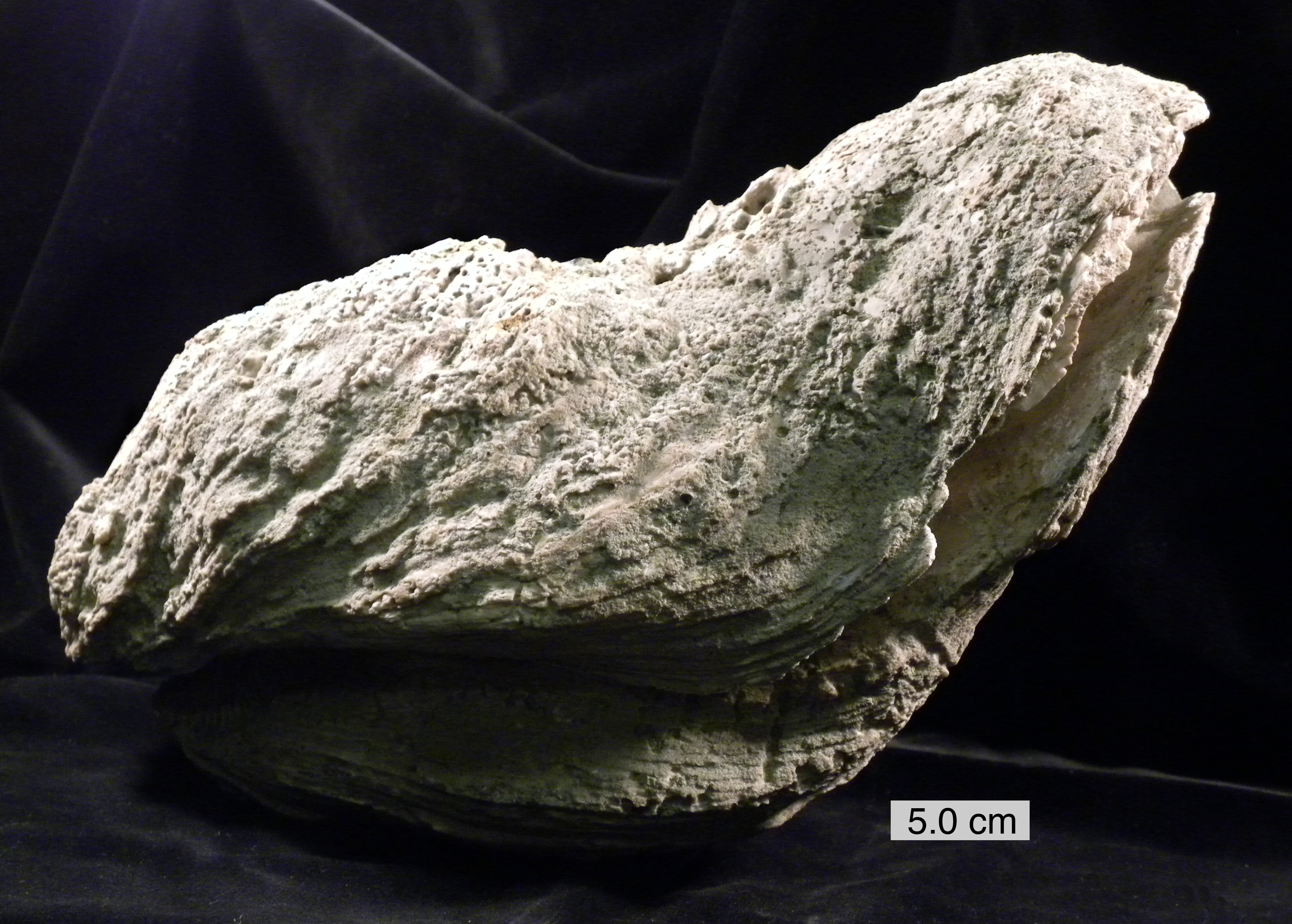
- Fossilized shell of the Cretaceous-modern oyster Crassostrea
  Crassostrea
  - †Crassostrea virginica
- Crepidula
  - †Crepidula convexa
  - †Crepidula fornicata
  - †Crepidula plana
- Cyclocardia
  - †Cyclocardia borealis
- Cytheromorpha
  - †Cytheromorpha macchesneyi
- Delphinapterus
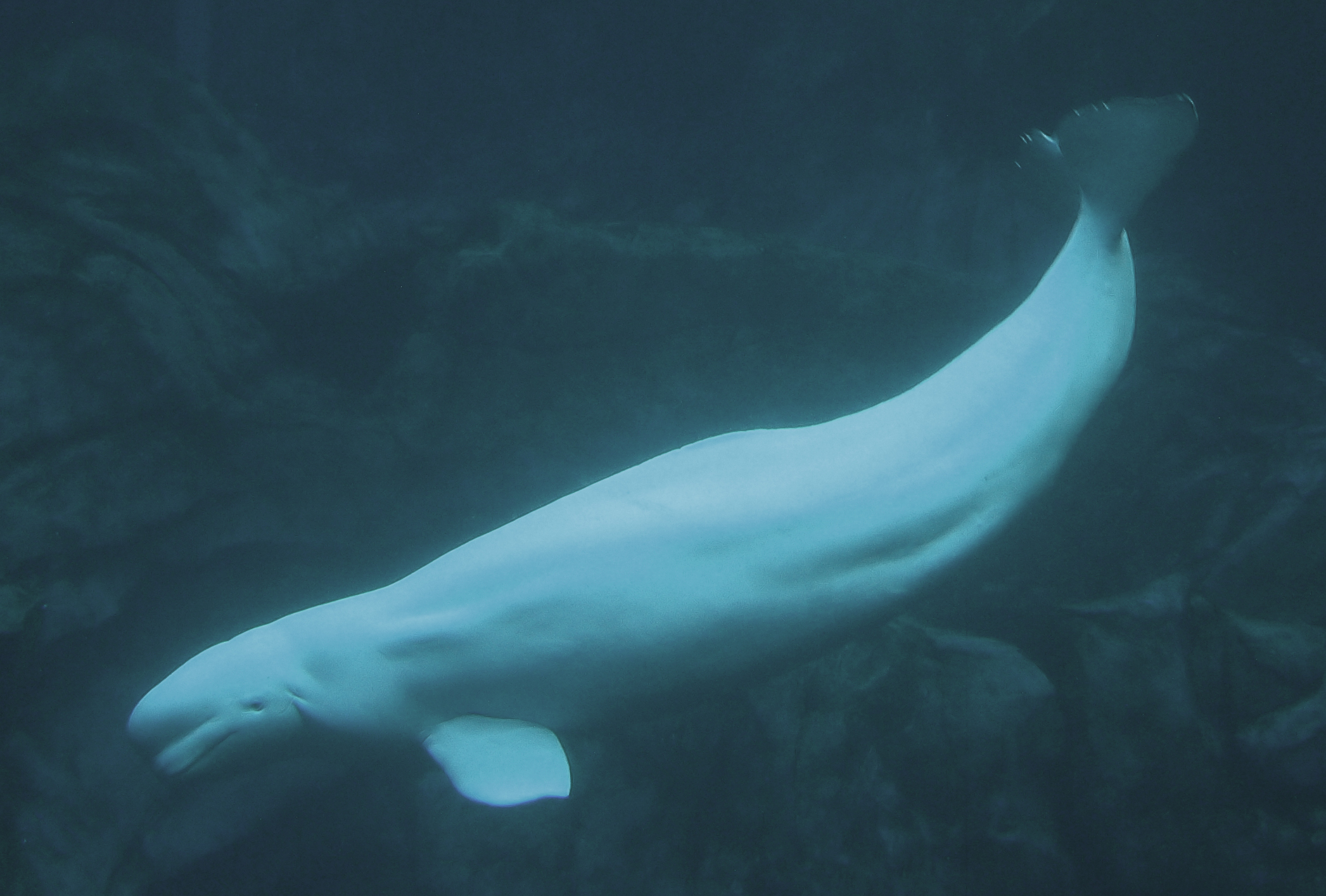
  - A living Delphinapterus leucas, or beluga whale
    †Delphinapterus leucas
- Electra
  - †Electra crustulenta
- Elphidium
- Ensis
  - †Ensis directus
- Eontia
  - †Eontia palmeri
- Epitonium
  - †Epitonium rupicola
- Eupleura
  - †Eupleura caudata
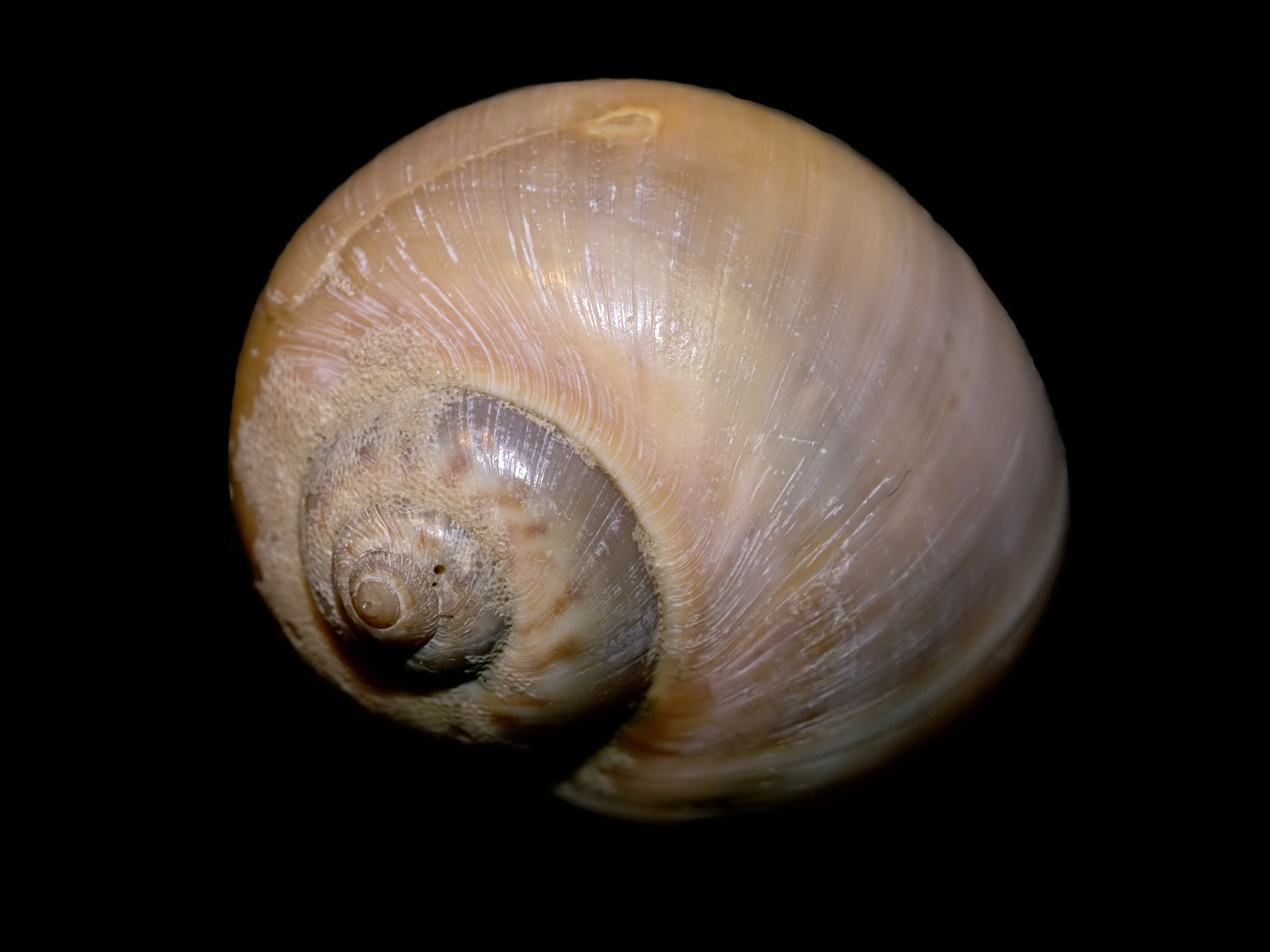
- Shell of a Euspira moon sea snail
  Euspira
  - †Euspira heros
- Gemma
  - †Gemma gemma
- Hemimactra
  - †Hemimactra solidissima
- Heterocyprideis
  - †Heterocyprideis sorbyana
- Hiatella
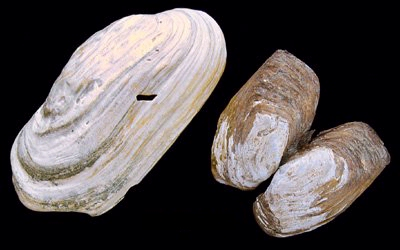
  - Two modern shells, closed (left) and open (right), of Hiatella arctica, also known as the wrinkled rock-borer
    †Hiatella arctica
- Ilyanassa
  - †Ilyanassa obsoleta
  - †Ilyanassa trivittata
- Macoma
  - †Macoma balthica
  - †Macoma petalum
- Marshallora
  - †Marshallora nigrocincta
- Melanella
  - †Melanella jamaicensis
- Mercenaria
  - †Mercenaria campechiensis
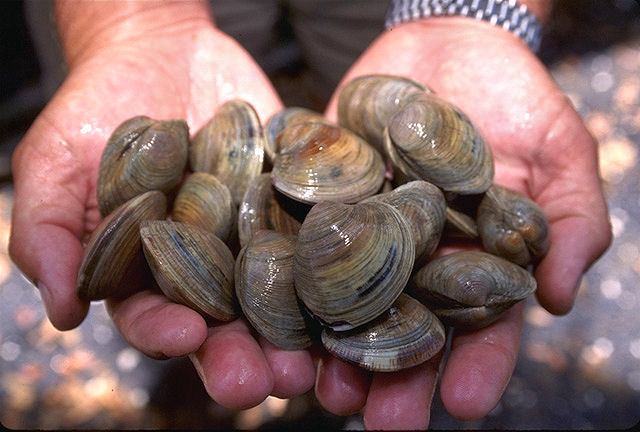
  - Collection of Mercenaria mercenaria, also known as hard clams or quahogs
    †Mercenaria mercenaria
- Mesodesma
  - †Mesodesma arctatum
- Mulinia
  - †Mulinia lateralis
- †Mya
  - †Mya arenaria
- Mytilus
  - †Mytilus edulis
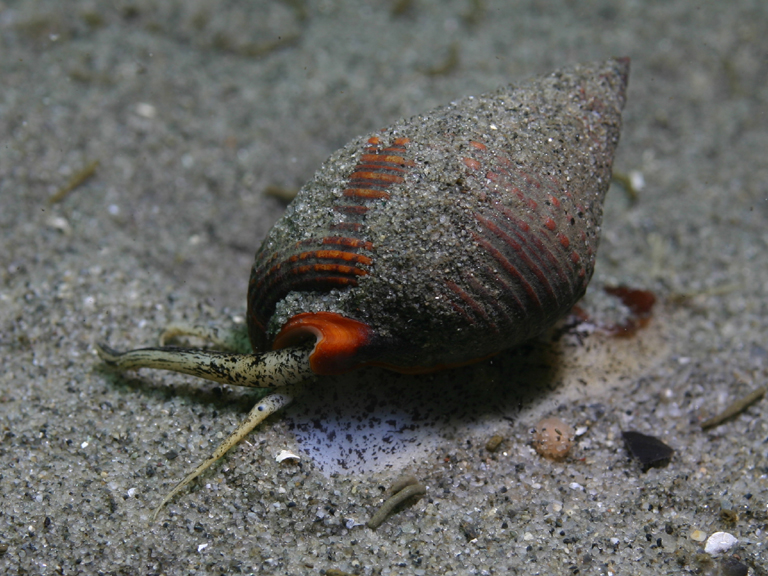
- A living Nassarius, or nassa mud snail
  Nassarius
  - †Nassarius vibex
- Natica
  - †Natica pusila
- Neptunea
  - †Neptunea lyrata
  - †Neptunea stonei
- Neverita
  - †Neverita duplicatus
- Nucella
  - †Nucella lapillus
- Nucula
  - †Nucula proxima
- Odostomia
  - †Odostomia bisuturalis
- Parasmittina
  - †Parasmittina trispinosa
- Phoca
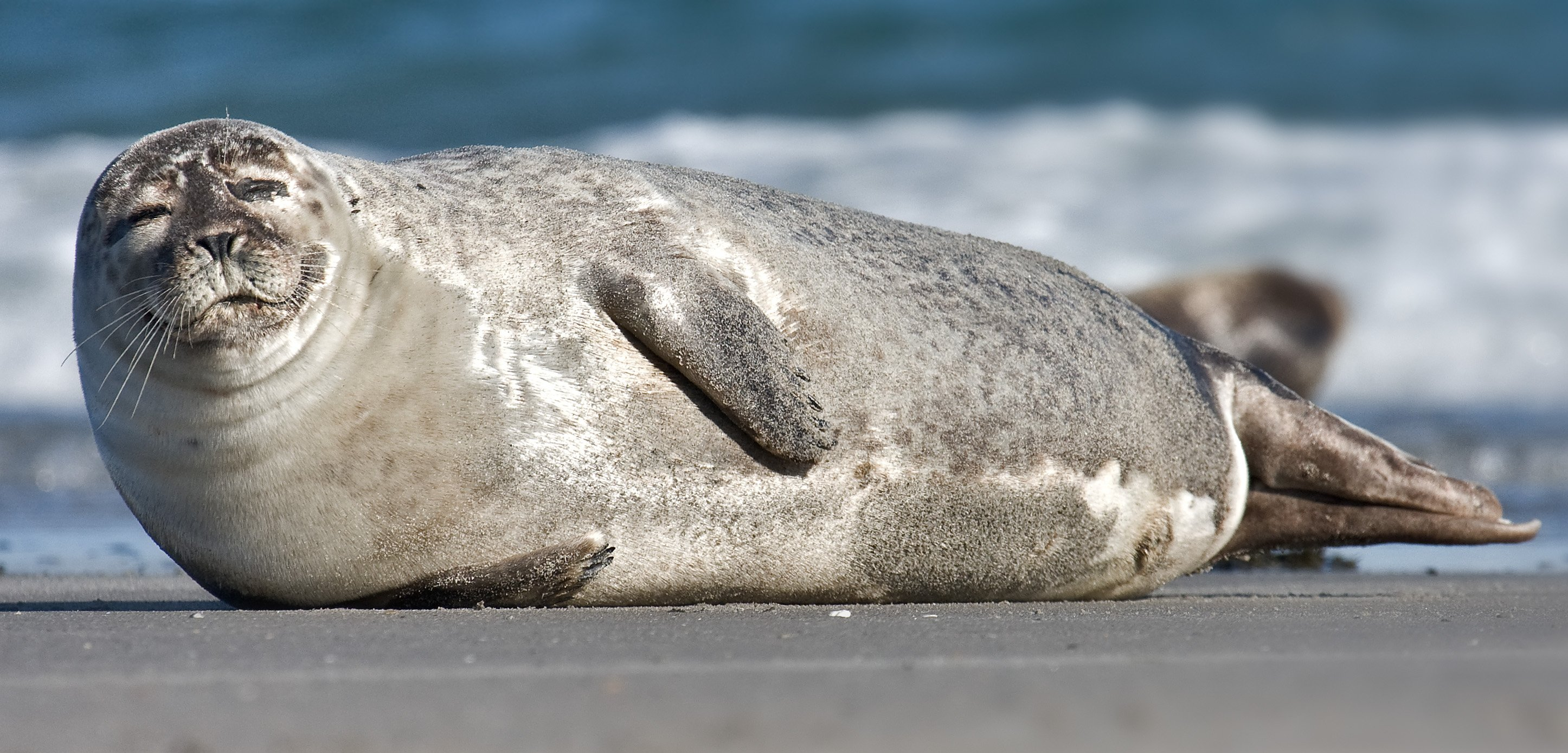
  - A living Phoca vitulina, or harbor seal
    †Phoca vitulina
- Pitar
  - †Pitar morrhuanus
- Placopecten
  - †Placopecten magellanicus
- Pusa
  - †Pusa hispida
- Schizoporella
  - †Schizoporella unicornis
- Seila
  - †Seila adamsii
- Skenea
  - †Skenea planorbis
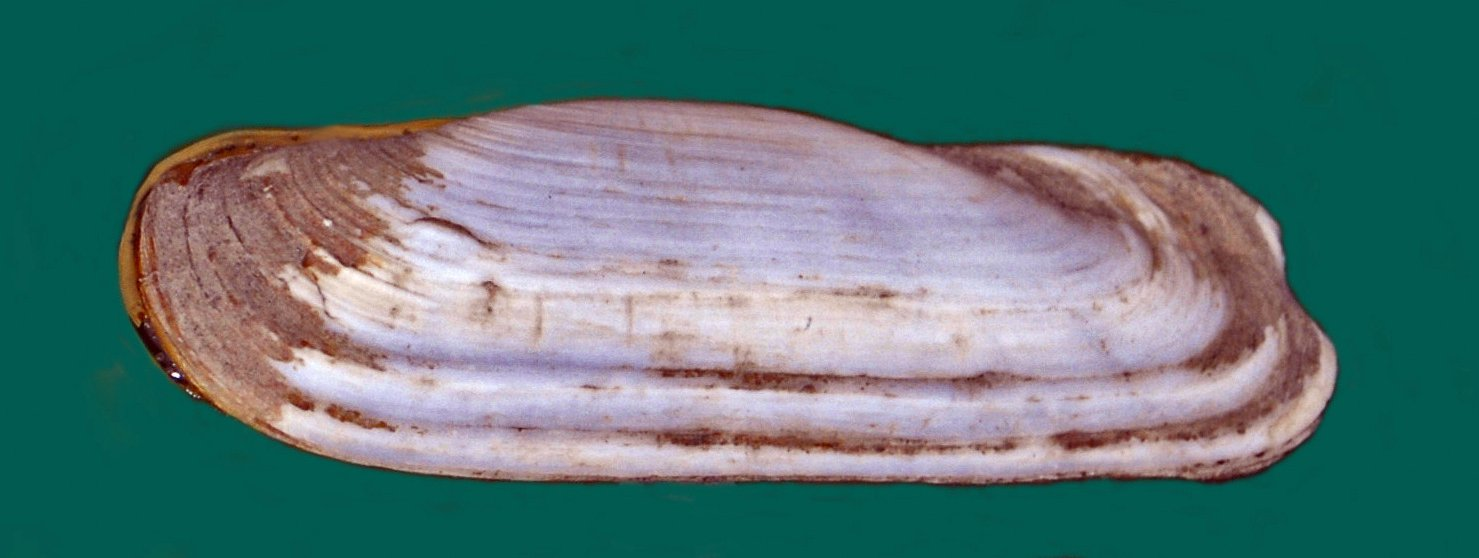
- Exterior and interior of the shell of a Tagelus marine bivalve
  Tagelus
  - †Tagelus plebeius
- Thracia
  - †Thracia conradi
- Turbonilla
  - †Turbonilla interrupta
- Urosalpinx
  - †Urosalpinx cinerea
- Yoldia
  - †Yoldia limatula
