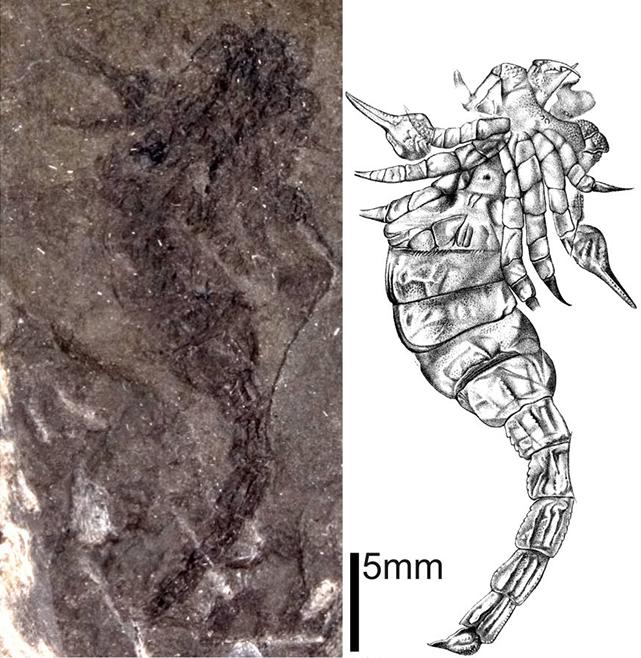
- Fossil specimen and illustration of Palaeophonus caledonicus
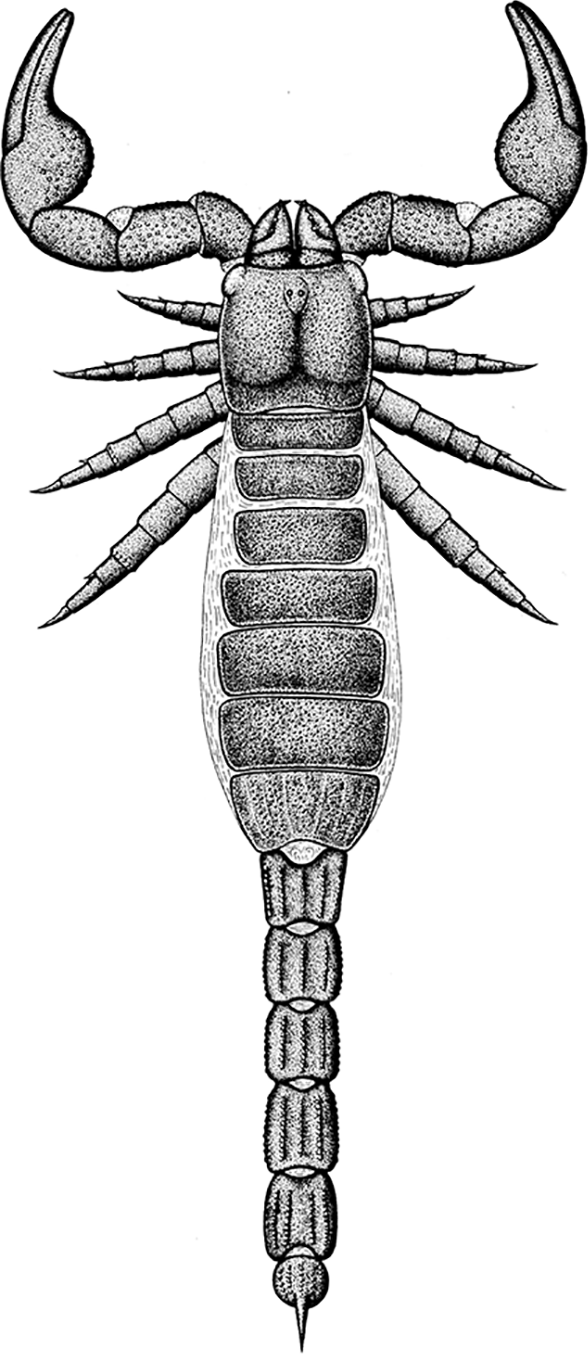
- Reconstruction

Scientific classification
- Domain: Eukaryota
- Kingdom: Animalia
- Phylum: Arthropoda
- Subphylum: Chelicerata
- Class: Arachnida
- Order: Scorpiones
- Suborder: †Lobosternina
- Superfamily: †Palaeophonoidea; Thorell & Lindström, 1884
- Family: †Palaeophonidae; Thorell & Lindström, 1884
- Genus: †Palaeophonus; Thorell & Lindström, 1884

Type species
- †Palaeophonus nuncius Thorell & Lindström, 1884

= Palaeophonus =

Palaeophonus Temporal range: Wenlock–Early Devonian

Extinct genus of scorpions

Palaeophonus (meaning "ancient killer") is one of the oldest known genera of scorpions.

== Fossil records ==
This genus has been reported in the fossil record from the Silurian to the Carboniferous (age range: 428.2 to 314.6 million years ago). Fossils were described from Europe, the United States, and Canada. However revision by Dunlop & Garwood (2023) demonstrated that Allopalaeophonus is a junior synonym of Palaeophonus and that there are only two valid species, P. nuncius Thorell and Lindström 1884 from Sweden and P. caledonicus Hunter, 1886 from Scotland. The species P. arctus Matthew, 1894 from the Carboniferous of Canada and P. lightbodyi Kjellesvig-Waering 1954 from the Silurian of England are nomina dubia.

== Description ==
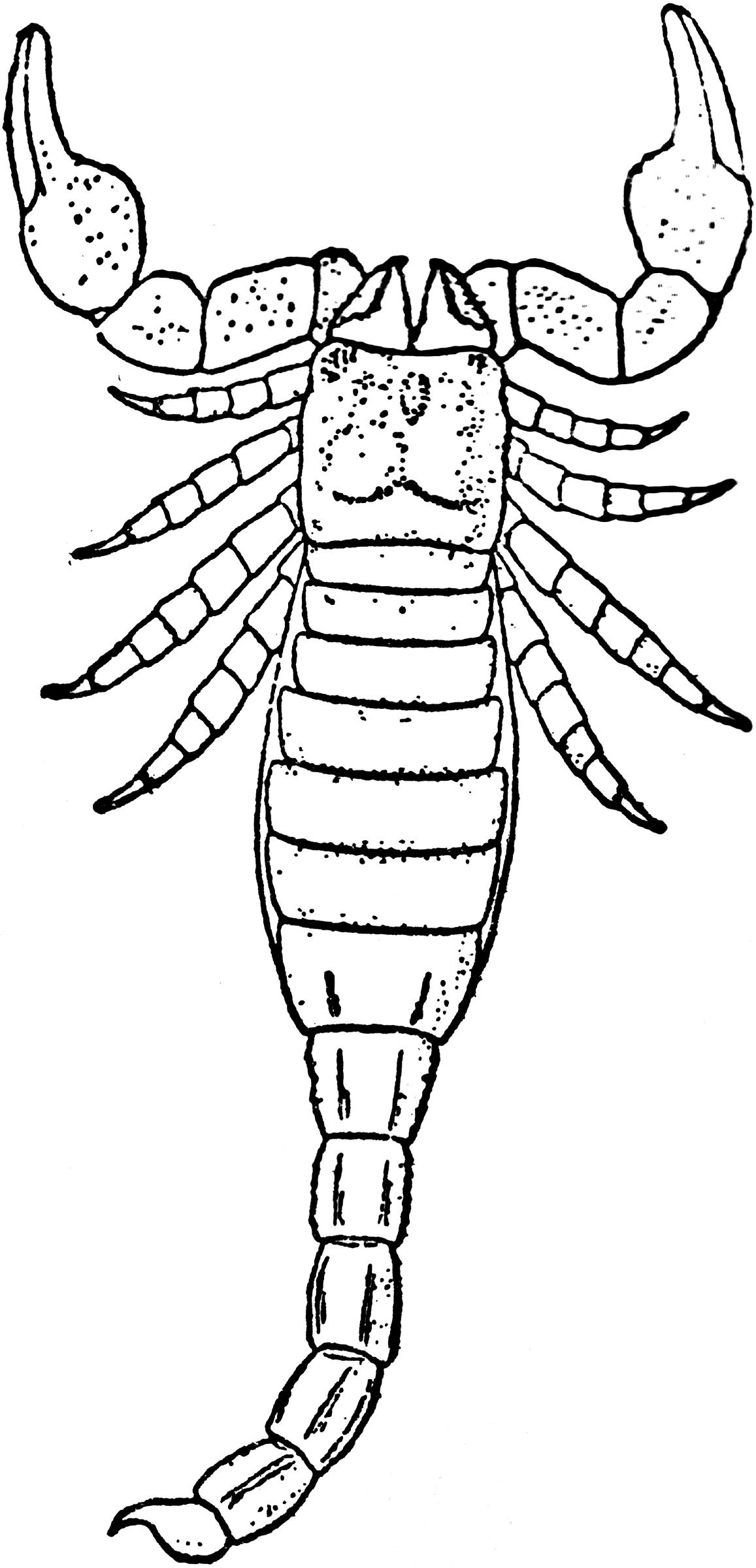
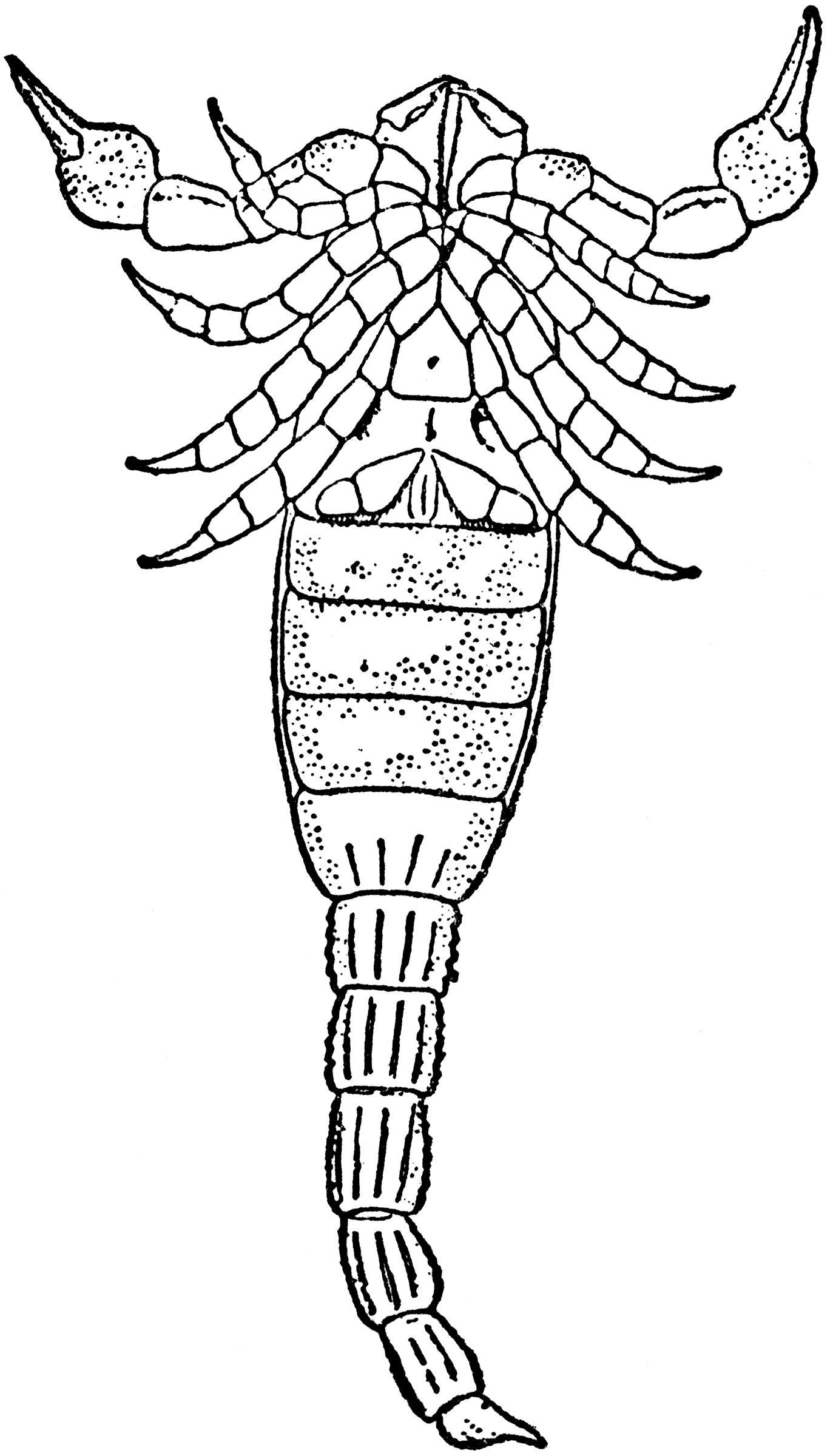
Reconstruction of P. nuncius in dorsal view and P. caledonicus in ventral view

Palaeophonus resembles modern scorpions, but differs in having short, pointed legs, as opposed to longer legs ending in a pair of claws. It grew to a lengths of 2.5–3.5 in (64–89 mm). These animals did not have eyes and therefore they were blind.

Palaeophonus seems to have been terrestrial.

== Species ==
Species within this genus include:

- †P. caledonicus Hunter, 1886
- †P. nuncius Thorell & Lindström, 1884
