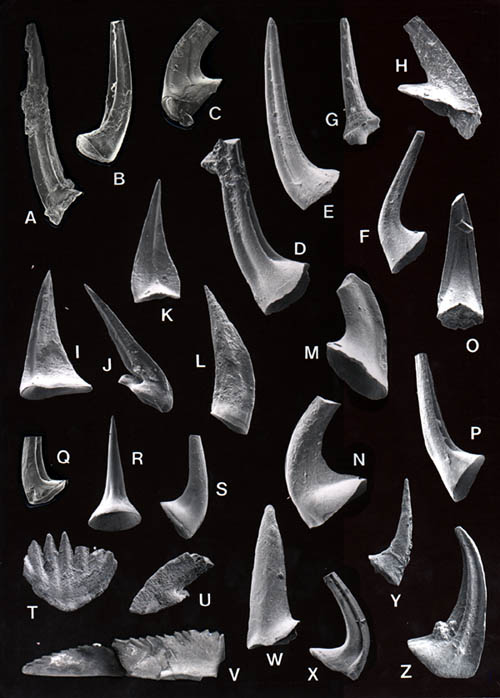
- X, Variabiloconus bassleri (Furnish); inner lateral view, X 60, specimen from upper part of middle Gasconade Dolomites at Phillips Quarry, USNM 498519.

Scientific classification
- Kingdom: Animalia
- Phylum: Chordata
- Infraphylum: Agnatha
- Class: †Conodonta
- Genus: †Variabiloconus; Landing, Barnes and Stevens, 1986

Species
- †Variabiloconus bassleri; †Variabiloconus crassus; †Variabiloconus transiapetus; †Variabiloconus variabilis

= Variabiloconus =

Variabiloconus Temporal range: Furongian–Tremadocian

Extinct genus of jawless fishes

Variabiloconus is an extinct genus of conodonts.

Variabiloconus bassleri (Furnish) is from the upper part of middle Gasconade Dolomites at Phillips Quarry, United States.

Variabiloconus crassus Zeballo and Albanesi, 2013 is from the Late Cambrian (late Furongian) or early Ordovician (Tremadocian) of the Santa Rosita Formation in the Tilcara Range, Cordillera Oriental of Jujuy in Argentina.
