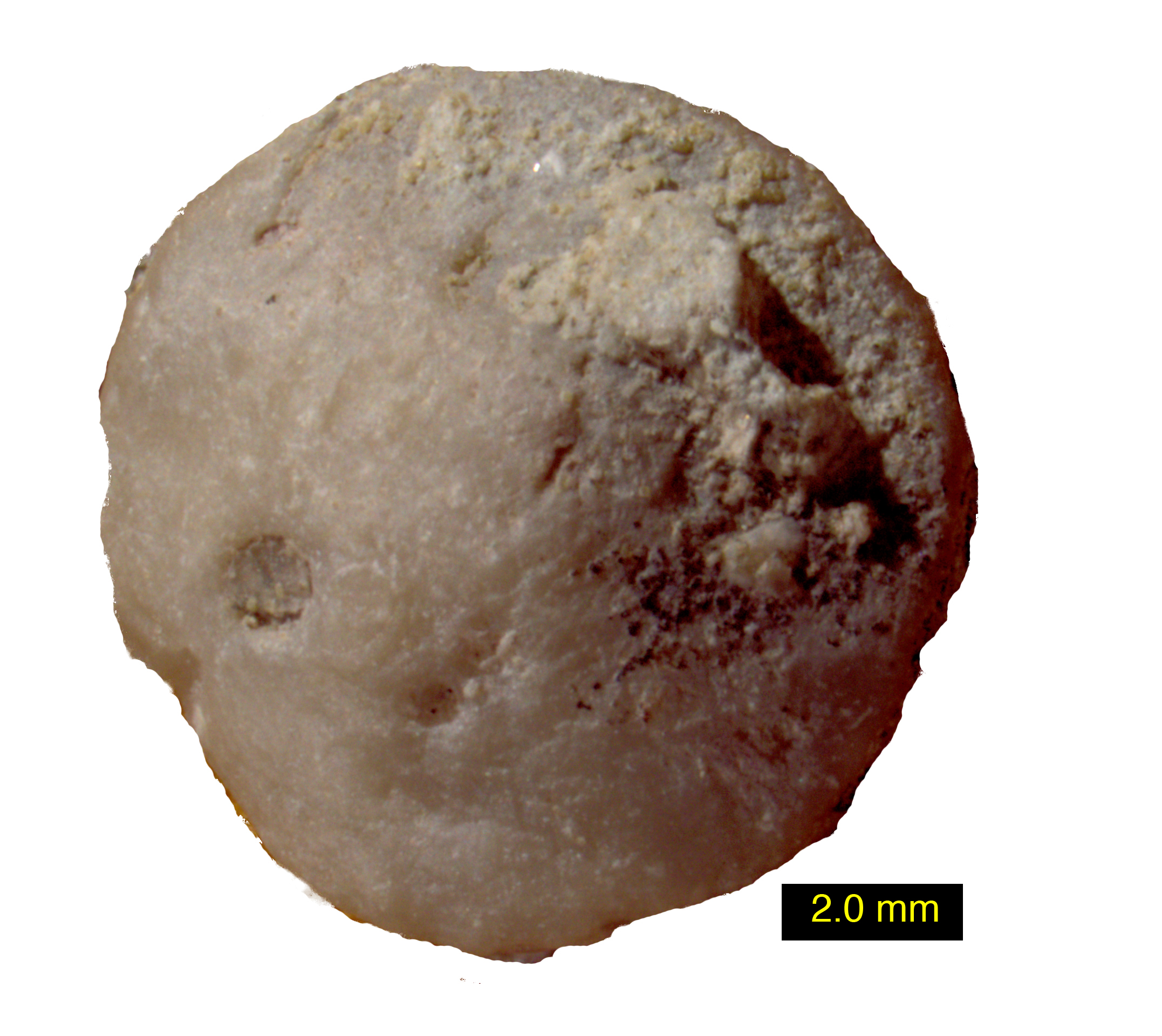
- Bolboporites top view (Middle Ordovician, Russia)
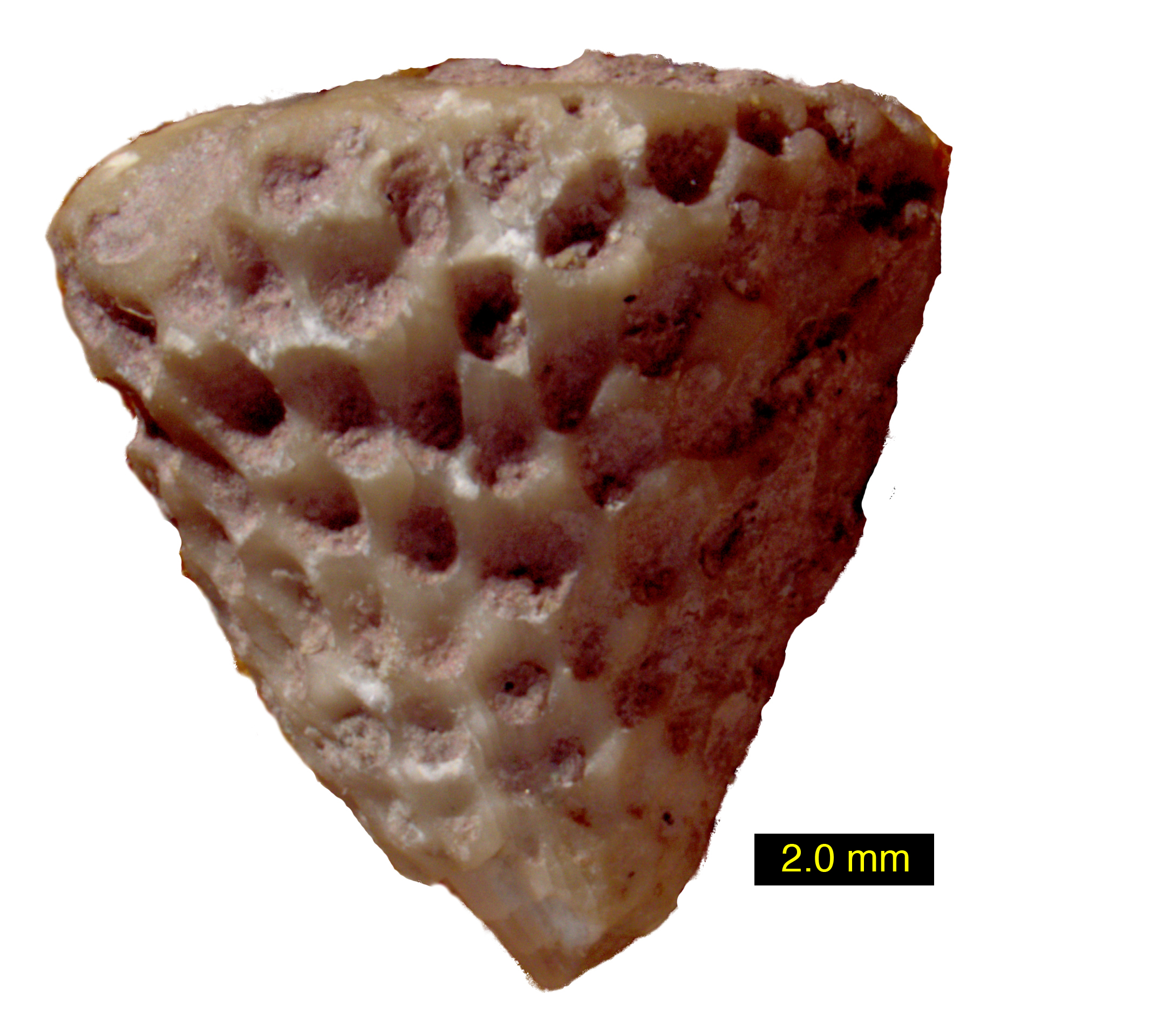
- Bolboporites side view (Middle Ordovician, Russia)

Scientific classification
- Kingdom: Animalia
- Phylum: Echinodermata
- Subphylum: Echinozoa
- Genus: †Bolboporites; Pander 1830

= Bolboporites =

Bolboporites Temporal range: Ordovician

Extinct genus of marine invertebrates

Bolboporites is an enigmatic echinoderm fossil from the Ordovician of Europe and North America. It was once thought to be an unusual eocrinoid living on the seafloor with the pointed end of the cone down in the sediment, and a single brachiole extending from a hole in the upper surface. However, a recent re-assessment concluded that it is most likely a spine from an unknown echinoderm, possibly of primitive, non-echinoid echinozoan affinities. It likely diversified in the Baltic region and then migrated to North America.
