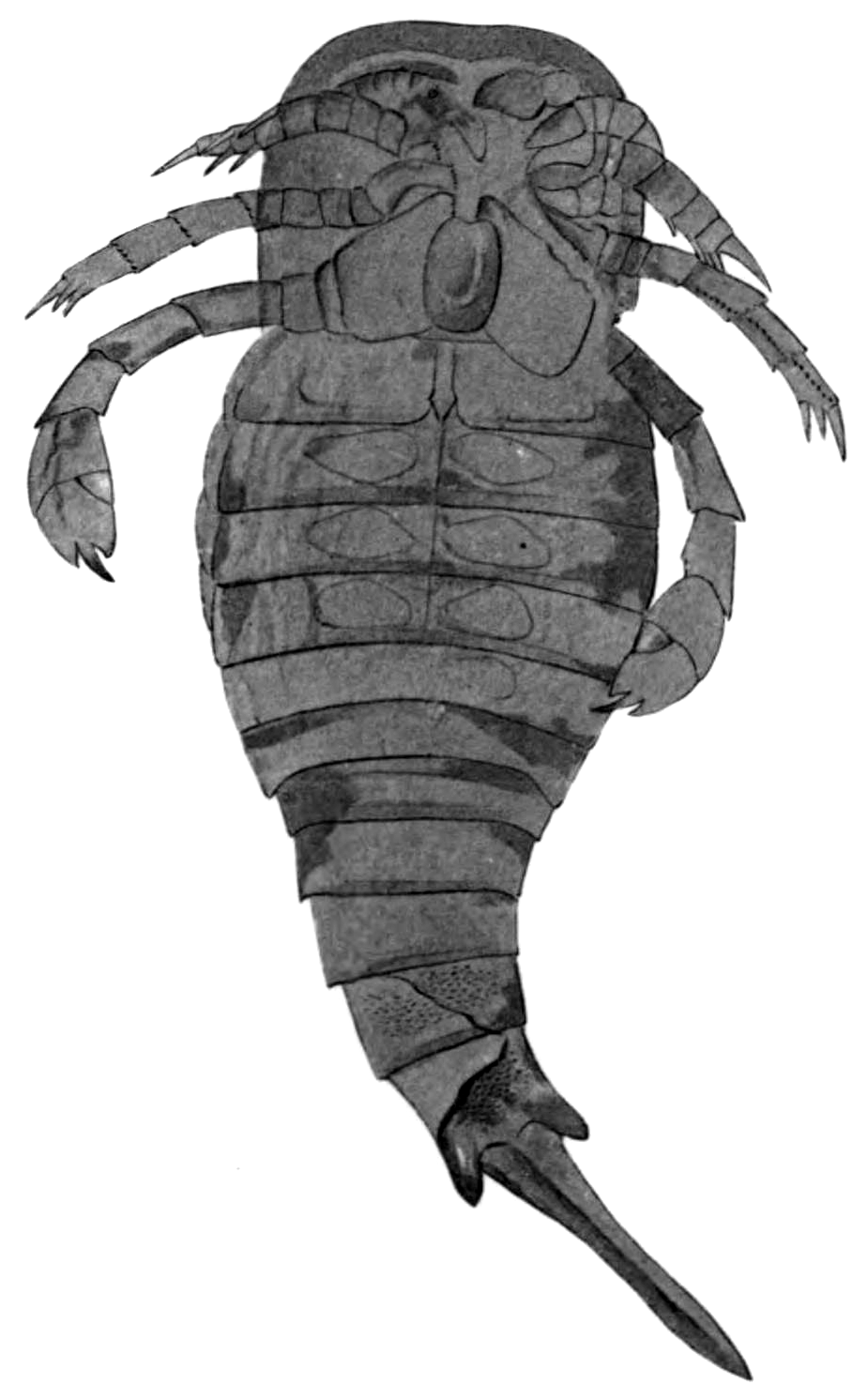
- Bottom view of the holotype specimen of O. kokomoensis recovered at Kokomo, Indiana, in the United States

Scientific classification
- Kingdom: Animalia
- Phylum: Arthropoda
- Subphylum: Chelicerata
- Order: †Eurypterida
- Superfamily: †Onychopterelloidea
- Family: †Onychopterellidae
- Genus: †Onychopterella; Størmer, 1951

Type species
- †Onychopterella kokomoensis Miller & Gurley, 1896

Species
- †O. augusti Braddy, Aldridge & Theron, 1995; †O. kokomoensis Miller & Gurley, 1896; †?O. pumilus Savage, 1916

Synonyms
- Onychopterus Clarke & Ruedemann, 1912, preoccupied; Eurypterus ranilarva Clarke & Ruedemann, 1912

= Onychopterella =

Onychopterella Temporal range: Late Hirnantian to Early Pridoli, 443.9–422 Ma

Extinct genus of arthropods

Onychopterella (/ˌɒnɪkɒptəˈrɛlə/ ON-ə-kop-tə-REL-ə, from Ancient Greek: ὄνῠξ (ónyx), "claw", and πτερόν (pteron), "wing") is a genus of predatory eurypterid ("sea scorpion"), an extinct group of aquatic arthropods. Fossils of Onychopterella have been discovered in deposits from the Late Ordovician to the Late Silurian. The genus contains three species: O. kokomoensis, the type species, from the Early Pridoli epoch of Indiana; O. pumilus, from the Early Llandovery epoch of Illinois, both from the United States; and O. augusti, from the Late Hirnantian to Early Rhuddanian stages of South Africa.

Its prosoma (head) could be subquadrate (almost square) or subrectangular (almost rectangular), with reniform (kidney-shaped) eyes. The appendages (limbs) were generally long, narrow and pointed at their tip. The abdomen and telson (the posteriormost division of the body) had different shapes and sizes depending on the species. The ornamentation of the body consisted of small, pointed scales. The largest species of the genus was O. kokomoensis with a total length of 16 centimetres (6.3 inches) long, followed by O. augusti (14.3 cm, 5.6 in) and O. pumilus (4 cm, 1.6 in).

The first Onychopterella fossils, belonging to O. kokomoensis, were discovered in 1896 at the Waterlime Group of Kokomo, Indiana. The species has received attention from eurypterid researchers for its terminal claw in the sixth pair of appendages or swimming legs. Onychopterella is also the type genus of the basal ("primitive") family of eurypterines Onychopterellidae together with Alkenopterus and Tylopterella, characterized by the presence of spines in the second to fourth pair of appendages and a lack of them in the fifth and sixth (except occasionally one on the distal end of the swimming leg), as well as the lanceolate (lance-shaped) or styliform (pen-shaped) form of the telson and other characteristics.

The exceptional preservation of the fossils of O. augusti has permitted scientists to describe part of the alimentary canal that has only been observed in a few species of eurypterids, as well as the internal muscular structure of its limbs and even part of the external branchial respiratory system. This turned out to be highly similar to that of the scorpions of today, supporting a eurypterid-scorpion relationship. Onychopterella was a genus that was able to swim. Most of the time it was likely in the stratum, probably using its spines to walk and its head to dig in the ground.

== Description ==
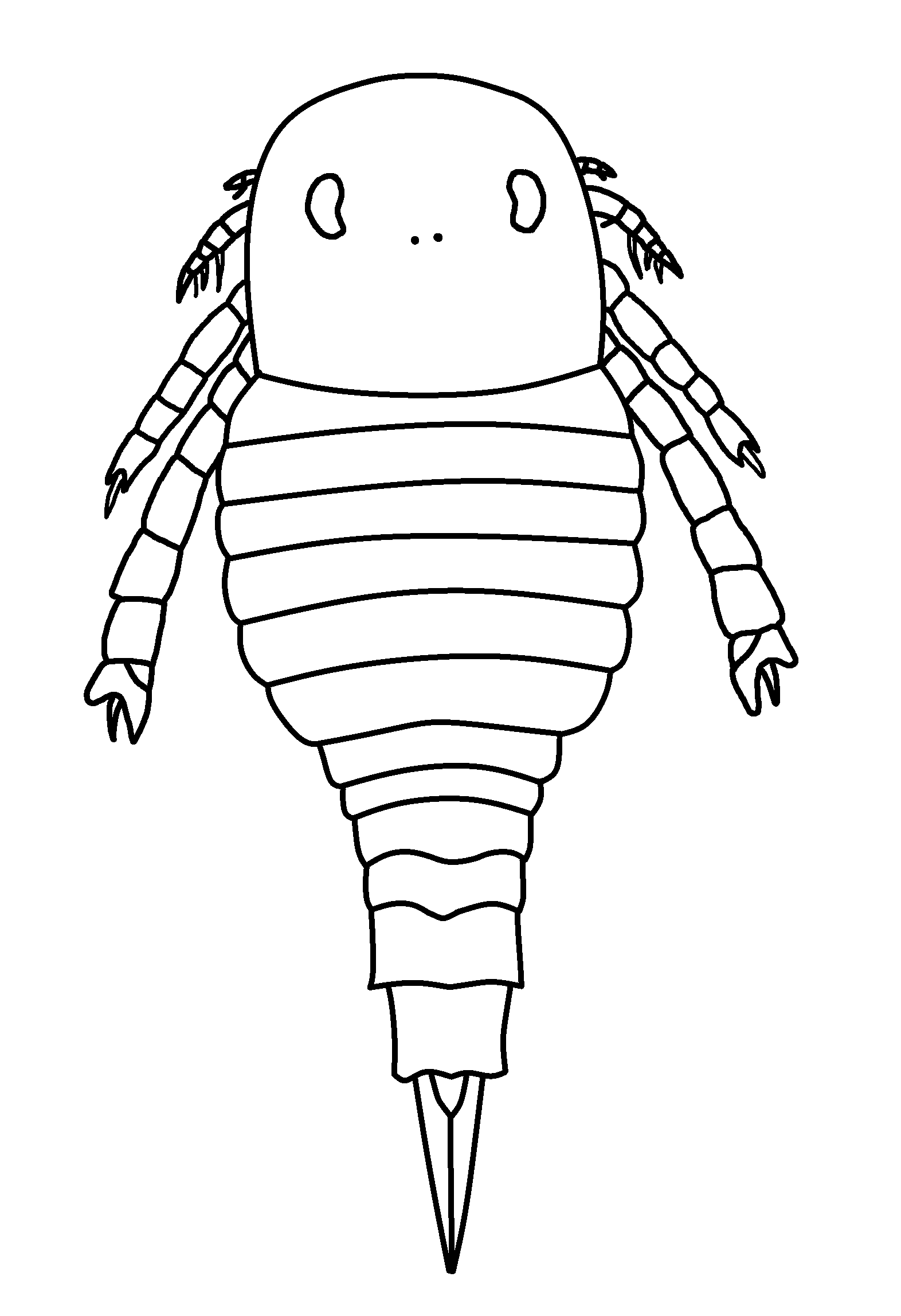
Restoration of O. augusti

Like the other onychopterellids, Onychopterella was a small eurypterid. The smallest species, O. pumilus, measured only 4 centimetres (1.6 inches). The size of the largest one, O. kokomoensis, is estimated at 16 cm (6.3 in), representing the biggest species of the family Onychopterellidae. O. augusti had a similar size, with the largest specimen reaching 14.3 cm (5.6 in).

The prosoma (head) had a subquadrate (almost square) shape in O. kokomoensis and O. augusti, while in O. pumilus it was subrectangular (almost rectangular). The outline of the carapace (the exoskeleton part covering the prosoma) varied according to the species. It was anteriorly rounded in the corners in O. kokomoensis, with almost straight lateral margins in O. pumilus, and resembled a horseshoe in O. augusti. In O. kokomoensis and O. pumilus, the eyes were reniform (kidney-shaped), standing out for their size and prominence in the latter species. The eyes of O. augusti are unknown. The metastoma (a large plate that is part of the abdomen) of O. kokomoensis was small, oval and slightly narrower anteriorly than posteriorly, while that of O. augusti was subcordate (almost heart-shaped) anteriorly and rounded posteriorly. The metastoma of O. pumilus is not known in its entirety. Only the posterior part, which was rounded, is known.

In O. kokomoensis, the preabdomen (body segments 1 to 6) was as long as it was wide, while the postabdomen (segments 7 to 12) was short and compact and gradually increased in length posteriorly. It was the only species with considerably large epimera (lateral "extensions" of the segment) in the pretelson (segment that preceded the tail). In O. pumilus, the preabdomen was wider than long, the fourth segment being the widest. The postabodmen was longer, decreasing in width more rapidly in the eighth and ninth segments than in the rest. The length of the segments gradually increased towards the telson (the posteriormost division of the body). The opisthosoma (abdomen) of O. augusti is known in more detail; the preabdomen was a little wider than long, with raised areas representing branchial (of the gills) chambers or respiratory tissue of the branchial tract. The postabdomen was short, and its segments gradually narrowed towards the telson. Each of the postabdominal segments had small epimera. The shape of the telson in O. kokomoensis was clavate (resembling a club), in O. pumilus it was styliform (pen-shaped) and in O. augusti it was lanceolate (lance-shaped).

The walking legs (second to fifth pair of appendages or limbs) were generally undifferentiated, long, narrow and with spines only at their distal end except in the fifth pair, which was not spiniferous. The swimming legs (sixth pair of appendages) were inconspicuous, very narrow and ending in a very long spike-like ninth podomere (leg segment). The swimming legs of O. augusti were easily recognizable from the other species by the prolongation of the eighth podomere into two lateral projections (parts of the body that protrude) and by the curved shape and great length of the spike-like podomere. The body ornamentation of Onychopterella, composed of small pointed scales, was the same in all species.

== History of research ==
Size comparison of the three species of Onychopterella

In 1896, paleontologists Samuel Almond Miller and William Frank Eugene Gurley described a new species of Eurypterus, E. kokomoensis, based on four specimens, three of them well-preserved and a fragmentary one, collected at the Waterlime Group at Kokomo, Indiana, in the United States. They noticed differences between the new species and E. remipes, the type species of Eurypterus, such as the proportions of the carapace, the shorter telson and the size and general form of the body. Only two pairs of appendages were described, suggesting the rest broke away during preservation, although the outline of a pair of unusually large swimming legs was reported. Miller and Gurley considered the preserved parts sufficiently similar to assign the species to Eurypterus. FMNH UC6638, an almost complete specimen, was designated as the type specimen.

In 1912, paleontologists John Mason Clarke and Rudolf Ruedemann considered E. kokomoensis different enough from other Eurypterus species and raised it to the subgeneric level under the new name Onychopterus on the basis that E. kokomoensis was the development path of other eurypterids such as Dolichopterus, Drepanopterus and Stylonurus from Eurypterus. They also noted the swimming legs were better preserved than stated in the original description, noticing four pairs of appendages and not two. The name Onychopterus is composed by the Ancient Greek words ὄνῠξ (ónyx, "claw"), and πτερόν (pteron, "wing"), therefore translated as "claw wing". They also described E. ranilarva as a close relative of O. (Eurypterus) kokomoensis, differing from the latter mainly in the greater width of the carapace. In 1948, paleontologist Erik Norman Kjellesvig-Waering concluded that Onychopterus warranted generic rank due to the undifferentiation of its fifth appendage and the possession of a claw in the sixth one. He also synonymized E. ranilarva with O. kokomoensis as he considered that the greater width was due only to differences of the preservation. In 1951, paleontologist and geologist Leif Størmer noticed that the name Onychopterus had been used previously by a bird genus introduced in 1850 by the ornithologist Ludwig Reichenbach. Størmer substituted the old name with a new one, Onychopterella.

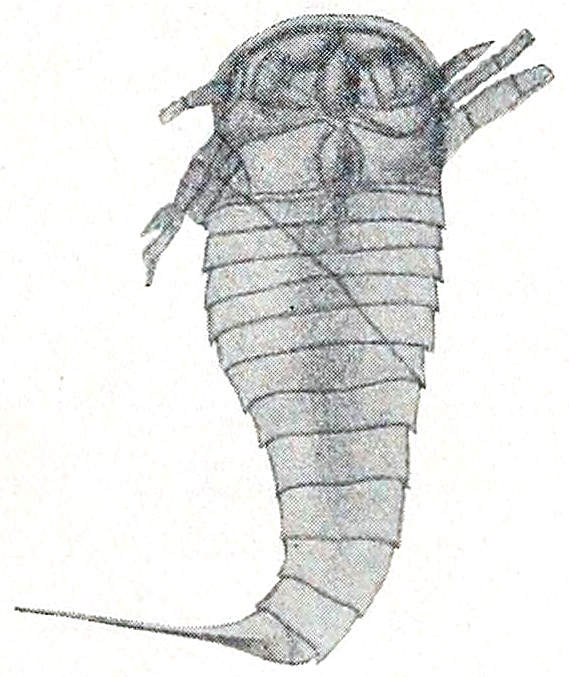
Superficial view of the holotype and only known specimen of O. pumilus

In 1916, researcher and geologist Thomas Edmund Savage erected the new species Eurypterus pumilus to accommodate one single well-preserved specimen showcasing the ventral side of the body from the Edgewood Limestone near Essex, Illinois, in the United States. E. pumilus was placed within Onychopterella in 1948 by Kjellesvig-Waering, who indicated that by its slender appendages without spines and the form of the telson, it clearly belonged to this genus. It differed from the type species by slimmer prosomal (of the prosoma) appendages, a tapering preabdomen, the lack of epimera in the pretelson and the placement of the eyes in a more forward position. The only known specimen of O. pumilus is deposited at the University of Illinois, but its accession number is unknown. It has been debated whether O. pumilus really belongs to this genus. In 1999, professor and paleobiologist Roy E. Plotnick considered that the species represented a form of Drepanopterus, while geologist and paleobiologist James C. Lamsdell suggested in 2012 that it belonged to Stoermeropterus because of the similarities of the metastoma, genital appendage and telson. A 1995 study led by paleontologist Simon J. Braddy proposed that because of its small size, O. pumilus could simply represent an ontogenetic stage (a different developmental stage of the same animal throughout its life) of O. kokomoensis. Due to the lack of a known accession number for the fossil, its re-examination is impossible.

In 1995, paleontologists Braddy, Richard John Aldridge and Johannes N. Theron described a well-preserved eurypterid from the Soom Shale Member of the Table Mountain Sandstone, Cape Province, South Africa, and named it O. augusti. It is based on two specimens of which one preserves soft tissues. The holotype (GSSA C373, housed at the Geological Survey of South Africa in Pretoria along with the paratype) was discovered by August Patrick Pedro, honoured in the specific epithet augusti. It differed from the rest of the species by the lack of large epimera in the pretelson, wider body proportions, the short length of the postabdomen and telson, the lanceolate form of the latter, the two projections of the eighth podomere and in a distal spine longer than in the rest of the species. The paratype, GSSA C427, is the largest known specimen. O. augusti was also compared to the enigmatic Silurian eurypterid Marsupipterus sculpturatus, concluding that the differences between the telson (the only known part of Marsupipterus) of both species are probably preservational.

== Classification ==
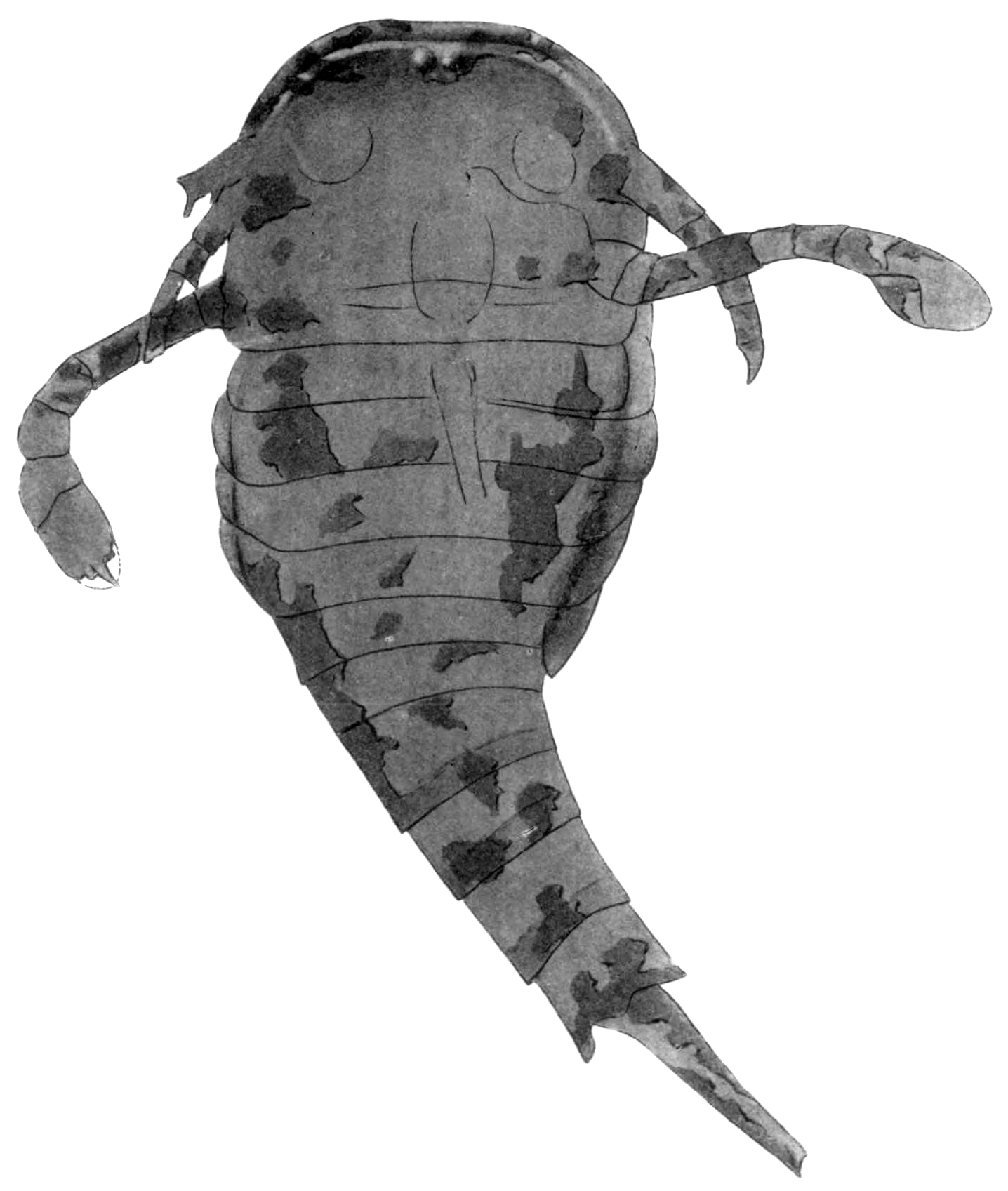
Top view of the largest known specimen of O. kokomoensis, FMNH 12905 (16.05 cm, 6.32 in, holotype of the synonym E. ranilarva), housed at the Field Museum of Natural History, Chicago

Onychopterella is classified as part of its own family, Onychopterellidae, the only clade (taxonomic "group") within the monotypic superfamily Onychopterelloidea. It was originally described as a subgenus of Eurypterus, but it was recognized as a distinct genus in 1948.

It has been suggested that Onychopterella could represent a paraphyletic genus, that is, a grouping sharing a last common ancestor but not including all descendants of this ancestor, and therefore an invalid genus. In 2007, paleontologists Odd Erik Tetlie and Michael B. Cuggy interpreted Onychopterella as such in a phylogenetic analysis due to the more stylonurine-like dimensions of the fourth and fifth podomeres of the swimming leg in O. augusti than in O. kokomoensis. They also considered Onychopterella the most basal (primitive) member of the suborder Eurypterina (in which the sixth appendage is modified into a swimming leg), mainly because of the narrowness of the swimming leg and its distal spine, resulting in a better model for a primitive swimming leg than other derived members of Eurypterina such as Dolichopterus, ending in a large plate. The species O. pumilus was not included in the analysis because of its possible affiliation with Drepanopterus.

In 2011, Lamsdell recovered Onychopterella as monophyletic (a group consisting of all the descendants of the last common ancestor, i.e. a valid genus), considering Moselopteroidea the most basal eurypterine clade. He also erected the new superfamily Onychopterelloidea and family Onychopterellidae, placing within the latter the genera Onychopterella and Tylopterella. This family was characterized by the presence of spines in the second to fourth pairs of appendages, lack of spines in the fifth and sixth (except occasionally a distal spine in the last podomere of the sixth appendage), the shape of the carapace with lateral eyes and a lanceolate or styliform telson, among other features. Alkenopterus was assigned to Onychopterellidae three years later because of the detection of a movable spine in the swimming leg, rather than a simple projection as previously thought. Before the creation of Onychopterellidae, Onychopterella had been classified in the family Erieopteridae since 1989 by paleontologist Victor P. Tollerton, initially together with Erieopterus and Buffalopterus based on similarities of the morphology of the appendages and the opisthosoma.

The cladogram below is based on a larger study (simplified to only show eurypterids) in a 2011 phylogenetic analysis carried out by Lamsdell, showcasing the basal members of the Eurypterina suborder of eurypterids with other derived groups.

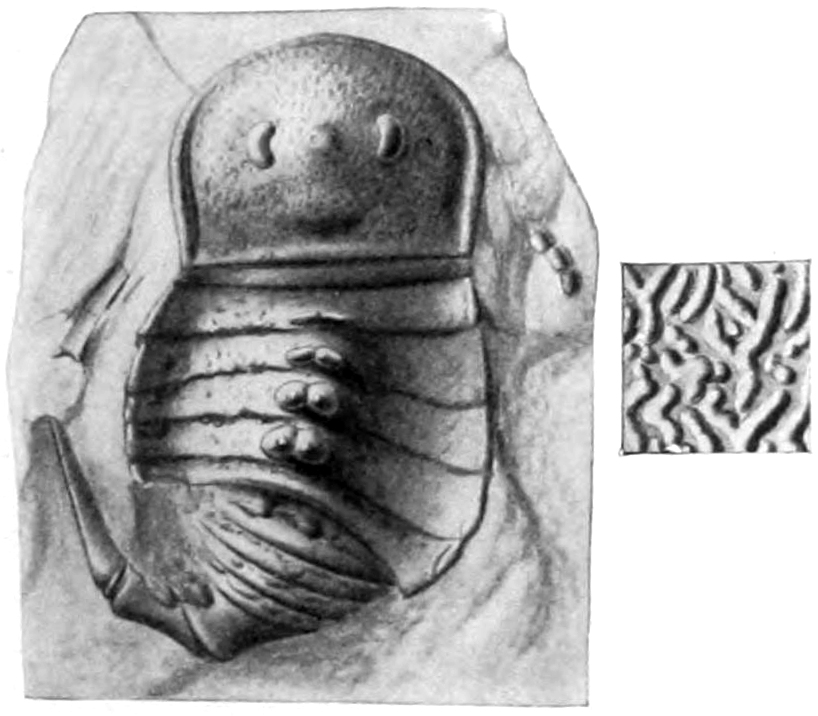
Fossil of Tylopterella, a closely related onychopterellid genus

- - - - Brachyopterus stubblefieldi
      - Rhenopterus diensti
    - Parastylonurus ornatus
  - - - - - - Stoermeropterus nodosus
            - Stoermeropterus latus
          - Stoermeropterus conicus
        - - - Vinetopterus martini
            - Vinetopterus struvei
          - - Moselopterus ancylotelson
            - Moselopterus elongatus
    - - - - Onychopterella augusti
          - Onychopterella kokomoensis
        - Tylopterella boylei
      - - - Dolichopterus macrocheirus
          - Strobilopterus princetonii
        - - - Eurypterus remipes
            - Erieopterus microphthalmus
          - - Hughmilleria socialis
            - - Megalograptus ohioensis
              - Mixopterus kiaeri

== Paleobiology ==
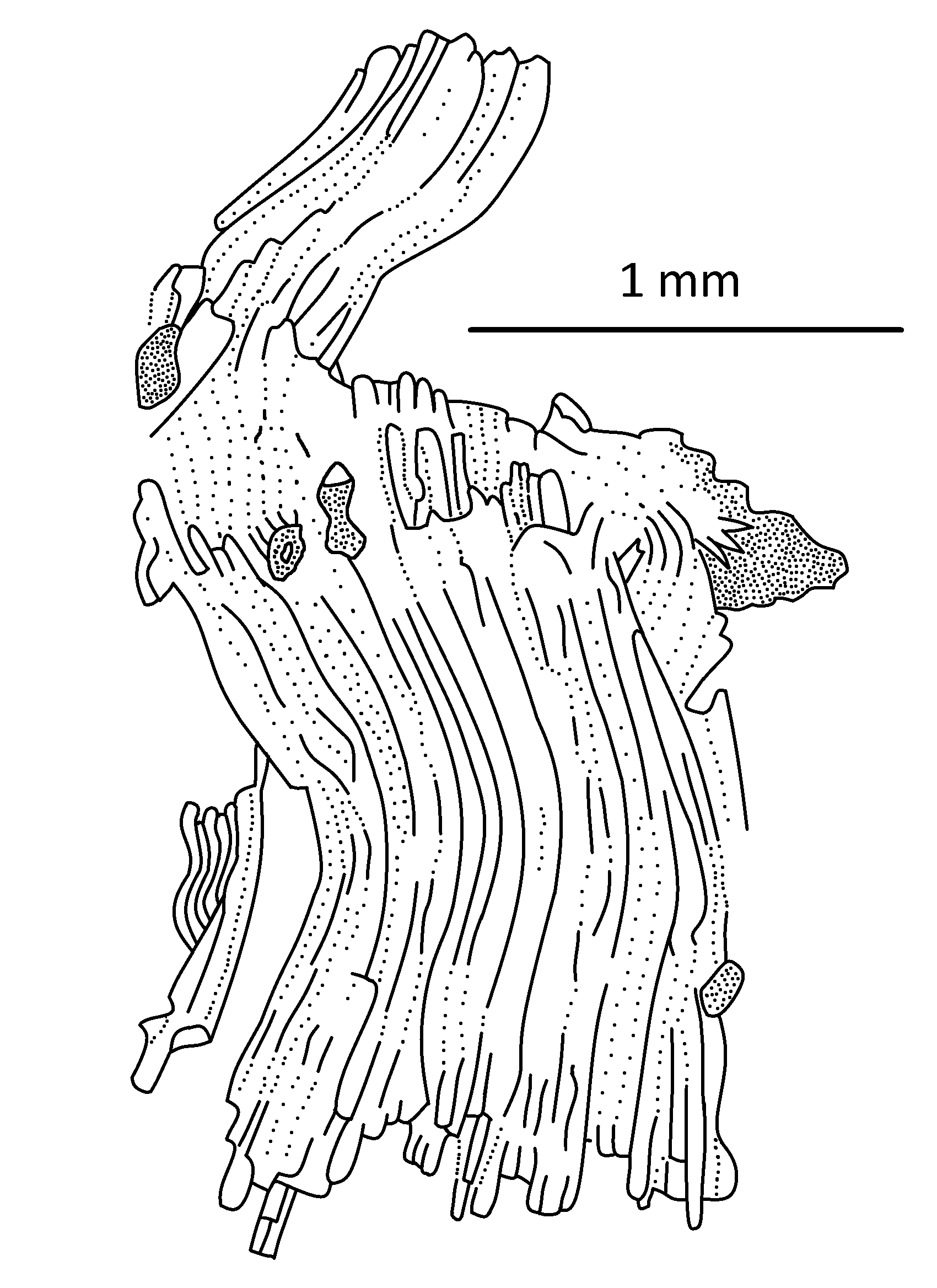
Camera lucida view of the best preserved book gill of O. augusti

Only the alimentary canals of a few species of eurypterids, such as Carcinosoma newlini, Acutiramus cummingsi and Eurypterus lacustris, have been described. However, the excellent levels of preservation of the O. augusti fossils have allowed the description of what most likely was the anterior portion of the gut. Between the two coxal (from the coxa, the point of union with the appendages) muscle masses of the swimming leg, a spiral-shaped structure was found. A similar structure in the stylonurine Hibbertopterus wittebergensis, in which a spiral valve has been found near the posterior zone of the prosoma, has been reported. These valves have developed independently in certain groups of fishes in response to the need to increase the absorptive area of the gut, so Braddy, Aldridge and Theron considered the case was the same for the eurypterids. Nevertheless, the presence of this valve may have depended on the digestion and absorption requirements of each eurypterid, in turn depending on factors such as the feeding habitats or the size of the animal. The appendages of H. wittebergensis suggest it was a sediment feeder, using its valve to extract food from the soil and increase the absorptive capacity of the gut. It is possible that the spiral structure of O. augusti had a similar function, acting as a valve for the mesenteron (midgut, formed by the stomach and intestines), thus increasing the absorptive area of this region. Apart from this spiral structure, the pretelson of the paratype preserves a faint impression that expanded posteriorly to a depression in the medial area, representing an anal opening.

Computer models and comparisons with the xiphosurans (commonly known as horseshoe crabs) suggest Onychopterella was a slow-moving and lumbering animal. When it was underwater, it moved by a series of short hops, taking advantage of its buoyancy. Given the relative lengths of the second to sixth pair of appendages, it is feasible that it could have had a stance in which it used eight limbs (an octopodous position) spaced far apart, ensuring little interference. Its great preservation has also allowed the examination of the internal muscular structure of the swimming leg. The coxal muscles were elongated towards an anterolateral orientation. This suggests the legs were maintained in a posterolateral position to walk in order, thus allowing sufficient stability at the animal's center of gravity, which was probably located near the second tergite (upper half of the segment). The presence of proximal podomeres and a terminal spine in the swimming leg indicates their primitive condition as natatory organs and their functional adaptation to walk. This reason and the lack of a more modified spike-like distal podomere may suggest Onychopterella was not a very efficient swimmer.

In 1999, Braddy, Aldridge, Theron and Sarah E. Gabbott, a geologist, described a new specimen of O. augusti from the Soom Shale (GSSA C1179, housed at the Geological Survey of South Africa) which preserves four pairs of vertical lamellate (composed of thin plates or scales) book gills (external gills arranged like the pages of a book), part of the respiratory system. This specimen preserves a complete carapace, partial appendages, complete opisthosoma and an almost complete telson. The lamellate structures are evident in the third to sixth segments of the preabdomen. These were horizontally divided into numerous tubes that could represent superficial "ribs". The specimen measured 4.5 cm (1.8 in) in length, while the best preserved lamellate structure (in the left part of the third segment) measured 1.79 millimetres (0.070 inches) in length and 1.67 mm (0.066 in) in width, with approximately 45 closely placed lamellae. This proves that Onychopterella and possibly all eurypterids possessed four pairs of vertically oriented lamellate book gills (possibly for aquatic respiration), instead of five pairs like the xiphosuran Limulus as previously thought. This structure is also comparable to that of the current scorpions, which have four pairs of vertically oriented book lungs with 140-150 lamellae per lung in the third to sixth segments, resulting in a synapomorphy (shared characteristic different from that of their latest common ancestor) between both clades and even increasing the possibilities of a sister group relationship (that is, that both clades are the closest relative to each other).

The eurypterid ichnospecies (a species based on fossil prints) Palmichnium capensis is thought to have belonged to O. augusti. This ichnospecies was found in the Table Mountain Sandstone and dates from the Ordovician, coinciding with O. augusti. Its trackways were medium-sized (largest track 13.6 cm, 5.4 in wide) and consisted of several symmetrical series of four tracks and individual typically oval or tear-shaped marks with small impressions on the sides, sometimes bilobed and intermittent. A median line was occasionally displayed. Several factors support that P. capensis represents the tracks of O. augusti; the average external width of P. capensis is comparable to that of fossils of O. augusti, the distal spines of the swimming leg of O. augusti could have caused such bilobed marks and Onychopterella represents the only Ordovician eurypterid from those deposits. In addition, the median line could have been produced by the telson touching the substrate. O. augusti would have been able to make incursions to the terrestrial surface, but it would have been uncomfortable for it, performing an undulatory gait and keeping its telson in regular contact with the ground, hence the median line. But nevertheless, this can not be completely proven unless a specimen of O. augusti is found alongside similar tracks.

== Paleoecology ==
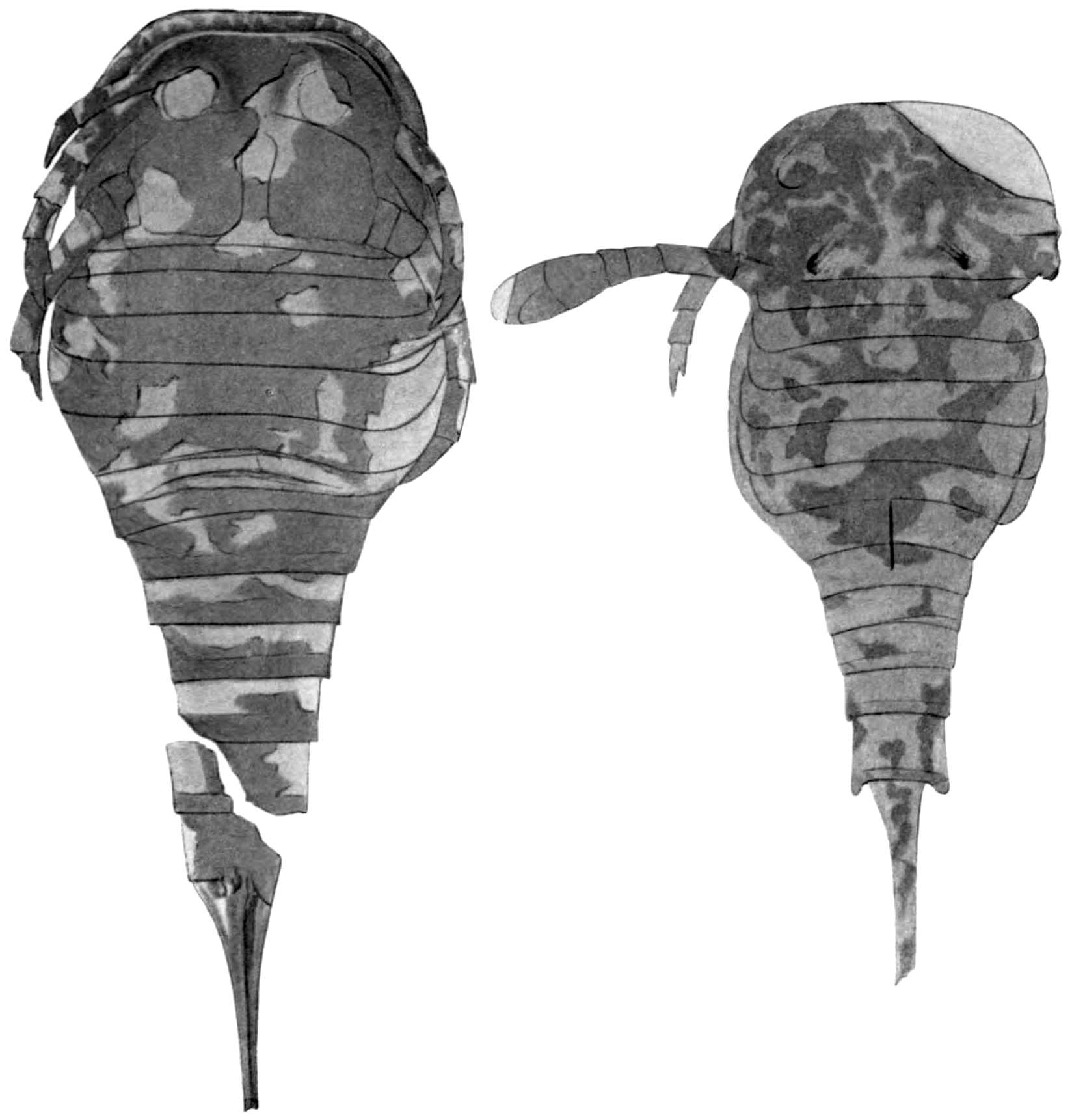
Two specimens of O. kokomoensis from the Kokomo waterlime, seen from above

It is thought that the genus Onychopterella lived in brackish (water with salt but not completely salty) and possibly marine water. It was undoubtedly nektobenthic, that is, being able to swim but staying most of the time in the stratum. The less developed and narrow swimming legs, as well as the short and stout postabdomen, show that the genus was not a very good nor active swimmer, possibly using its terminal spine to walk. The broad doublure (the fringe of the dorsal exoskeleton) of the carapace could have been adapted for shoveling or digging. O. augusti was deposited during a period of sea level rise (due to the release of water from glaciers) in glaciolacustrine (relating to lakes derived from glaciers) to shallow marine environments. The conditions under the surface were anoxic (with little oxygen). Coexisting with lingulid brachiopods (such as Orbiculoidea), orthoconic nautiloids, naraoiid chelicerates, conodonts and other organisms, O. augusti would have been a top predator, feeding on other arthropods, worms and probably conodonts. It lived during the Late Hirnantian (Late Ordovician) to Early Rhuddanian (Early Silurian) stages, in South Africa.

The type species, O. kokomoensis, inhabited a peritidal environment (in a part of the shore) along with other eurypterids such as Drepanopterus longicaudatus, Carcinosoma newlini and Erieopterus limuloides, as well as with the ostracod Leperditia ohioensis and the brachiopods Pentamerus divergens and Schuchertella interstriata. It was Early Pridoli (Late Silurian) in age, living in Indiana. On the other hand, O. pumilus, which lived in the Early Llandovery (Early Silurian) epoch of Illinois, is associated with many indeterminate species of anthozoans, craniates, brachiopods and gastropods in an open shallow subtidal (the sunlight reaches the bottom of the ocean) environment.

Most of the eurypterids found outside the supercontinent Laurentia were highly derived genera that lived during the prelude of the amalgamation (union) of Pangea, as well as genera with a more effective morphology for dispersion. Therefore, the isolated appearance of an ancient form like O. augusti in the supercontinent Gondwana is challenging for the scientific community to explain, since the genus was not a good disperser due to the narrow form of its swimming legs compared to other more derived groups such as Pterygotidae or Adelophthalmidae. It seems unlikely that the eurypterines originated in Gondwana since there is no record of fossil remains of stylonurines or other basal swimming forms. It also seems that the collectivity of O. augusti went extinct without leaving a viable population of eurypterids in Gondwana. It has been proposed that O. augusti established itself in Gondwana by crossing the sea floor during the periods of sea level descent of the Hirnantian. Onychopterella does not represent the only occurrence of basal genera in Gondwana; Paraeurypterus, a genus known from deposits of the Şort Tepe Formation in southeastern Turkey, probably arrived there by the same method as O. augusti.

== See also ==
- List of eurypterid genera
- Timeline of eurypterid research
