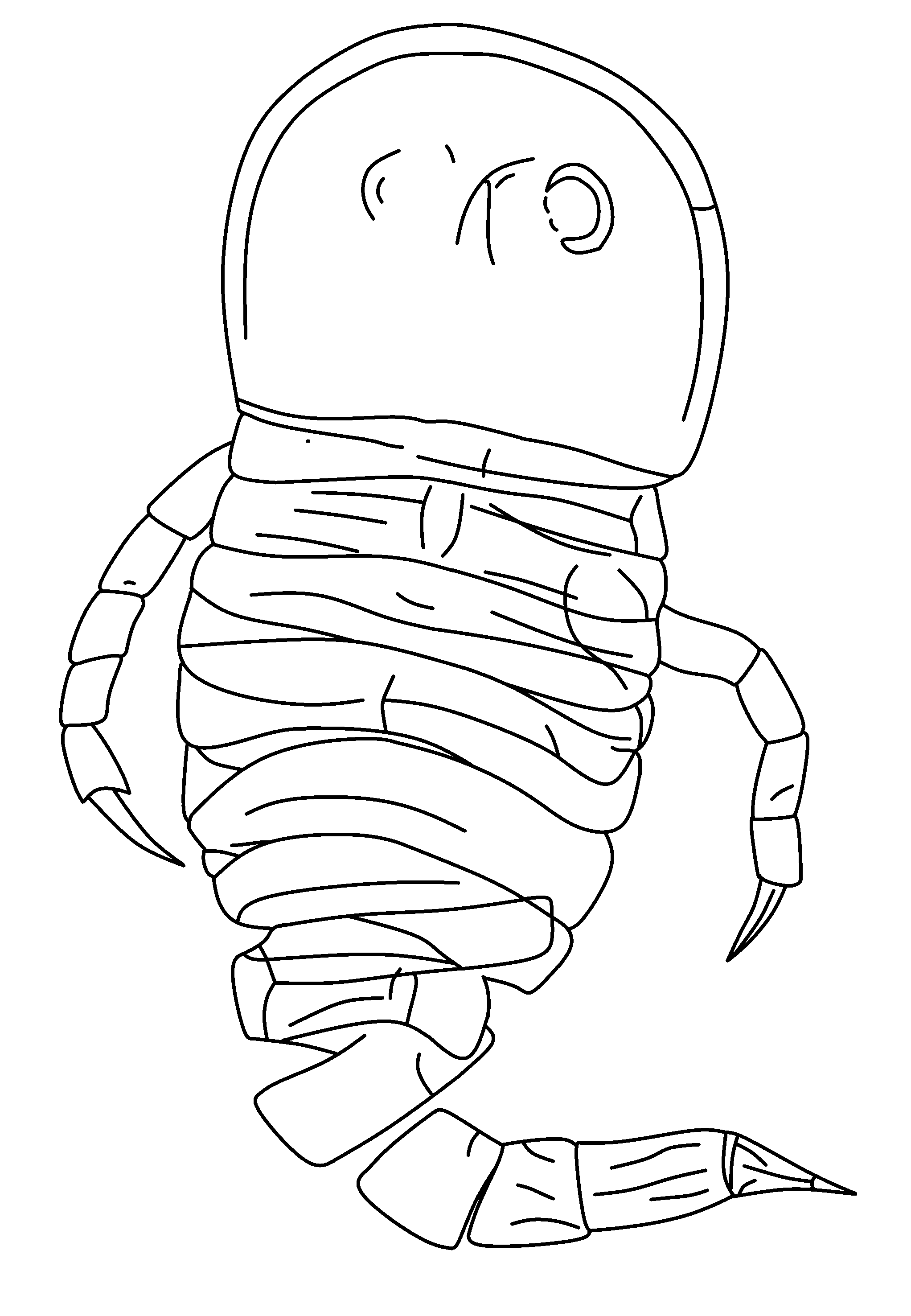
- SMF VIII 150, the holotype of Alkenopterus brevitelson

Scientific classification
- Kingdom: Animalia
- Phylum: Arthropoda
- Subphylum: Chelicerata
- Order: †Eurypterida
- Suborder: †Eurypterina
- Superfamily: †Alkenopteroidea; Poschmann & Tetlie, 2004
- Family: †Alkenopteridae; Poschmann & Tetlie, 2004
- Genus: †Alkenopterus; Størmer, 1974

Type species
- †Alkenopterus brevitelson Størmer, 1974

Species
- †A. brevitelson Størmer, 1974; †A. burglahrensis Poschmann & Tetlie, 2004

= Alkenopterus =

Alkenopterus Temporal range: Late Pragian-Early Emsian, 409–402.5 Ma

Extinct genus of arthropods

Alkenopterus is a genus of prehistoric eurypterid. The genus contains two species, A. brevitelson and A. burglahrensis, both from the Devonian of Germany. Alkenopterus is the only genus in the family Alkenopteridae, which in turn is the only family in the superfamily Alkenopteroidea.

== Description ==
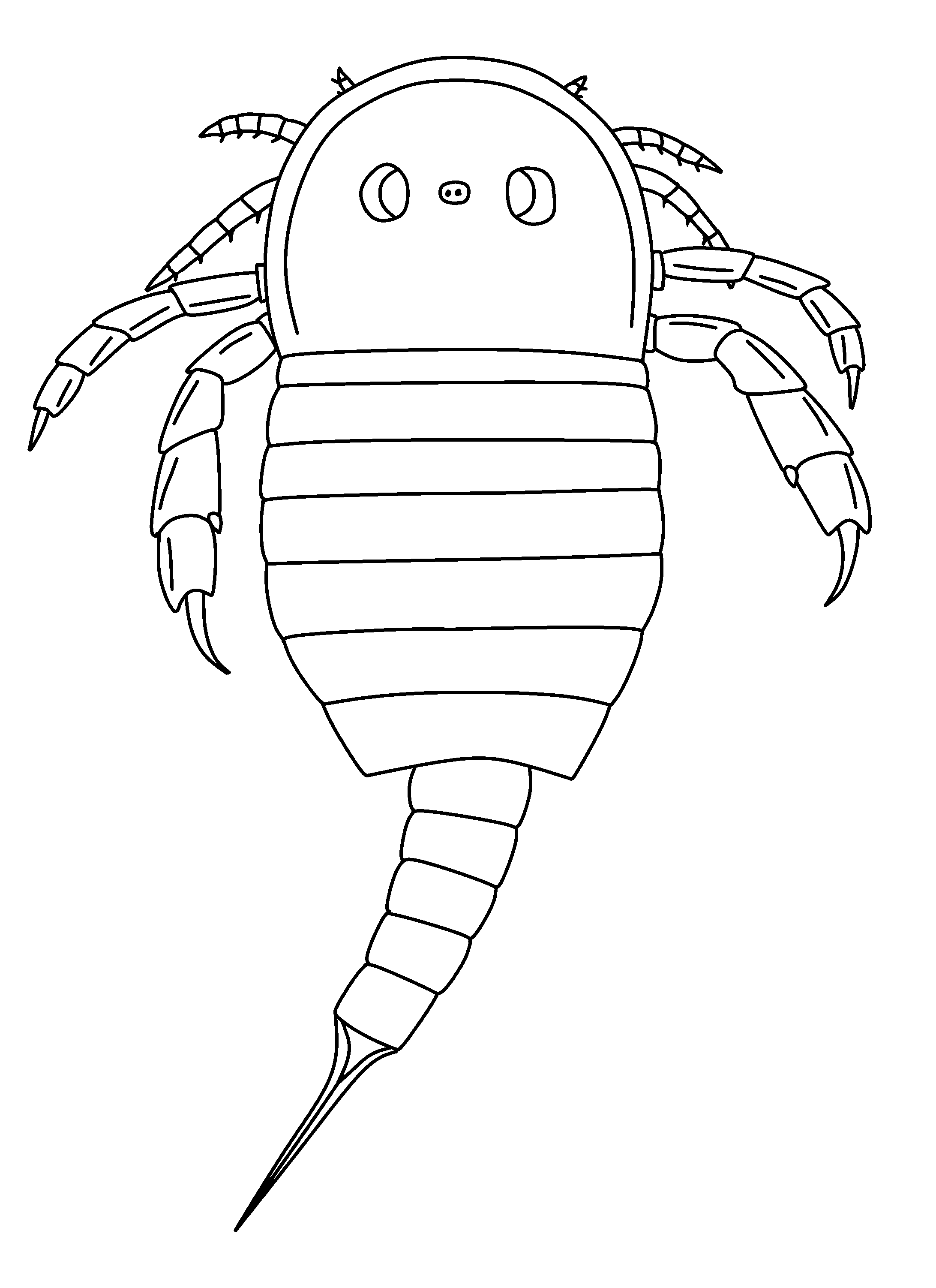
Restoration of A. burglahrensis. The second to fourth pair of appendages (limbs) are based on a close relative, Onychopterella augusti, while the fifth one is based on A. brevitelson.

Like the other onychopterellids, Alkenopterus was a small eurypterid. The largest species was A. brevitelson, being 7.5 centimetres (3.0 inches) long. The other species, A. burglahrensis, represents in fact the smallest species of eurypterid known as far, only measuring 2.03 cm (0.80 in).

The prosoma (head) was large, with a subquadrate (almost square) to semielliptic (nearly elliptic), horseshoe-like outline. It was anteriorly surrounded by a broad and flat marginal rim that reached its posterior corners. The carapace (the exoskeleton part covering the prosoma) was rounded in the front. Its surface was somewhat inflated, being distinguished several narrow grooves and ridges, most of them wrinkle-like. The prominent lateral eyes were placed in the center of the carapace. They were reniform (bean-shaped), with a strongly arcuate visual surface (a "half moon" in the eye). Between the eyes was located a tubercle or node carrying the ocelli (simple eye-like sensory organs). A. brevitelson also had between the eyes, behind the tubercle, certain grooves resembling the reversed V-shaped structure found in some stylonurines.

The appendages (limbs) of Alkenopterus are not known in much detail. A pair of poorly preserved appendages of A. brevitelson representing the sixth (and last) pair of them is known. The podomeres (leg segments) were more or less rectangular and constant in width. In the end there was a spine about as long as the podomeres which was slightly curved, with a long longitudinal groove. The third to fifth appendages are also known, but they are not exceptionally preserved. Nevertheless, in all of them a distal spine can be identified. Regarding A. burglahrensis, only an appendage belonging to the sixth pair with five distal podomeres (podomeres that were not underneath the prosoma) is known. The seventh and eighth podomeres (and perhaps more of them) were somewhat prolonged outwards and flattened. They featured spine-like immovable spurs on their anterior margins. On the posterior margin of the seventh podomere was the movable spine-like podomere 7a, characteristic of the eurypterines. All the podomeres had similar proportions, except the distal spine which was slightly curved and probably had a pointed tip.

The opisthosoma (abdomen) suffered a strong to moderate first order differentiation, that is, it was divided into a preabdomen (body segments 1 to 7) and a postabdomen (segments 8 to 12). The preabdomen had lateral convex margins and was quite short and broad, with the first tergite (dorsal half of the segment) being less wide than the subsequent ones. The postabdomen was narrow, had a constant width and did not have epimera (lateral "extensions" of the segment), like the preabdomen. The segments of the whole body were hardly distinguishable from each other. The integument of the body lacked ornamentation and was very smooth. The main difference between A. brevitelson and A. burglahrensis was the length of the telson (the posteriormost division of the body). The one of A. brevitelson was short, measuring only 0.55 cm (0.22 in) in a 7.5 cm (3.0 in) long specimen. The ratio between the total body length and telson of this specimen is around 13.6. It was slightly subtriangular (almost triangular) and had a median "keel" (ridge), with an expanded anterior base articulated to the pretelson (segment that preceded the telson). In the other hand, the telson of A. burglahrensis was long, measuring 0.35 cm (0.14 in) in a specimen with 2.03 cm (0.80 in) in total, with a ratio significantly small of 5.8. It had an expanded anterior portion as well. The telson of both species had, however, the same styliform shape.

== History of research ==
Size comparison of both species of Alkenopterus

In 1974, paleontologist Leif Størmer described two specimens of a new eurypterid. SMF VIII 150 (the holotype) is a relatively complete and well preserved fossil with almost all the appendages missing, while SMF VIII 241 (the paratype) is a smaller, little preserved and strongly telescoped (with segments overlapping each other, a defect product of the fossilization of the organism) specimen. Both were collected in the Nellenköpfchen Formation near the municipality of Alken in Rhineland-Palatinate, Germany (then West Germany). Currently, they are located in the Naturmuseum Senckenberg. This new eurypterid was named Alkenopterus brevitelson, with the generic name composed by Alken and the Ancient Greek suffix πτερόν (pteron, "wing"), commonly used in eurypterids. On the other hand, the specific name brevitelson derives from the Latin word brevis (short) and the Ancient Greek word τέλσον (literally "terminal", but here referring to the telson). Størmer also compared Alkenopterus with Drepanopterus and Moselopterus, placing them in the stylonuroid family Drepanopteridae doubtfully alongside Onychopterella.

In 2004, paleontologists Markus Poschmann and Odd Erik Tetlie described a series of new fossils found in the Nellenköpfchen Formation, in the center of the Rhenish Massif, Germany. Among them were two new specimens of A. brevitelson from Alken, 624-D (a well-preserved prosoma with remains of appendages) and 697-D (a fragmentary specimen with the prosoma, appendages, preabdomen, the last two postabdominal segments and telson). They also redescribed the holotype of A. brevitelson. Further, a specimen of a new species of Alkenopterus was found in another locality in the Nellenköpfchen Formation, near Burglahr (in the same state as Alken). PWL 2002/5011 LS is almost complete and well-preserved but somewhat distorted; it is the only known find of this species. It was named A. burglahrensis, the specific name coming from Burglahr due to the proximity of its type locality with this municipality. A. burglahrensis was very similar to A. brevitelson, the former having a longer and broader telson and more strongly expanded distal podomeres in appendage VI than the latter.

Poschmann and Tetlie claimed to find no evidence of a podomere 7a in the sixth appendage of Alkenopterus, determining that it could no longer be classified as part of Drepanopteridae, thus erecting the new family Alkenopteridae for it. This family was not assigned to any superfamily due to the poor knowledge of the second to fourth appendages of its only genus, Alkenopterus. Alkenopteridae was distinguished by the Drepanopterus-type B (with no podomere 7a) fifth appendage and an "Alkenopterus-type" sixth appendage, this one having podomeres almost equal in length (except the distal spine) and moderately flattened. Both pairs of appendages lacked spines. The Alkenopterus-type leg was introduced as a new standard type of non-spiniferous eurypterid appendage. Alkenopterus (as well as Drepanopteridae, now monotypic) would be subsequently included in the Stylonurina suborder for not possessing the podomere 7a. However, in 2014, Poschmann reexamined the holotype of A. burglahrensis by carefully removing some of the matrix of the fossil and using light microscopy with a higher magnification. This resulted in the detection of a movable podomere 7a instead of a simple projection as previously thought. Therefore, Poschmann assigned it to the family Onychopterellidae, with whom it shared several characteristics. It is assumed that in the fossils of A. brevitelson, this podomere was not preserved, but if this is not the case, A. brevitelson should be reassigned to Stylonurina and A. burglahrensis to a new onychopterellid genus.

Phylogenetic analyses tend to recover Alkenopterus as intermediate between Moselopteroidea and Onychopterelloidea. Lamsdell (2025) considered this to necessitate that Alkenopterus be placed in a clade of its own, reviving the use of Alkenopteridae, and placing Alkenopteridae in the new superfamily Alkenopteroidea.

== See also ==
- List of eurypterid genera
- Timeline of eurypterid research
