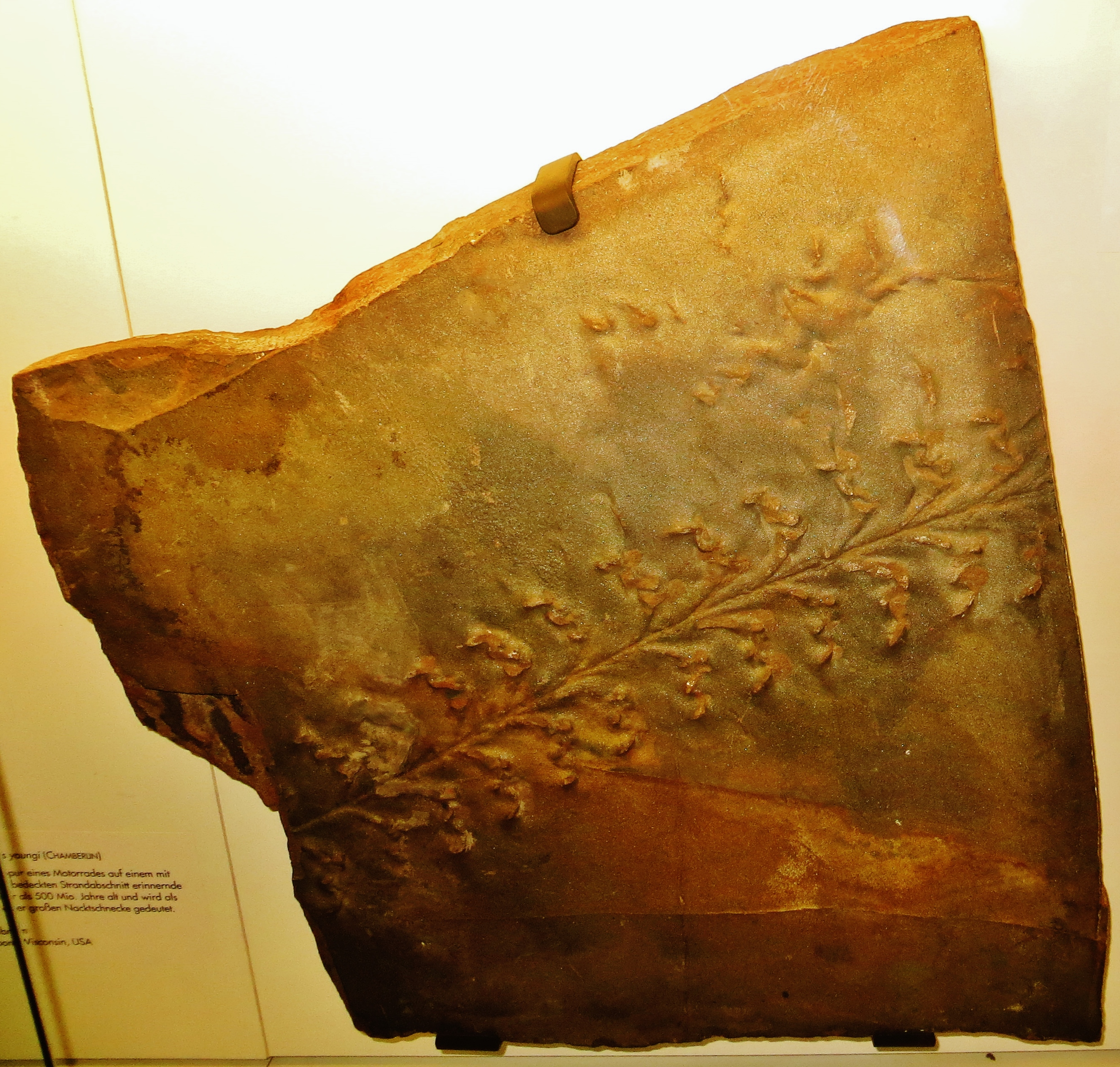
- Trackway of P. palmatum at the Naturmuseum Senckenberg

Trace fossil classification
- Ichnogenus: †Palmichnium; Richter, 1954

Type ichnospecies
- †Palmichnium palmatum Richter, 1954

= Palmichnium =

Palmichnium Temporal range: Silurian–Devonian

Palmichnium ("palm trace") is an ichnofossil genus, interpreted as a eurypterid trackway. It has been found by many places around the world, such as Australia, Canada, United States, Wales and India.

Its trackways consist of three or four subcircular tracks that are symmetrical around a midline impression that is arranged en echelon with a high angle to the midline.

== Ichnospecies ==
The ichnogenus contains eight ichnospecies.

- Palmichnium antarcticum Gevers et al., 1971
- Palmichnium capensis Anderson, 1975
- ?Palmichnium culmicum Pfeiffer, 1968
- Palmichnium kosinskiorum Briggs and Rolfe, 1983
- Palmichnium macdonaldi Braddy, 1995
- Palmichnium palmatum Richter, 1954 (type)
- Palmichnium pottsae Braddy and Anderson, 1996
- Palmichnium stoermeri Briggs and Rolfe, 1983

== History of research ==
In 1975, Ann M. Anderson described a new ichnospecies of Petalichnus from the Table Mountain Sandstone of South Africa, P. capensis, Ordovician in time. Its ichnospecific name capensis refers to the type locality in the Cape Province of South Africa. Anderson noted that P. capensis was larger than the rest of the Petalichnus ichnospecies, as well as the presence of an unusual median drag line for the ichnogenus (although this was not present in all the specimens). However, in 1999, Simon J. Braddy and John E. Almond formally reclassified some specimens of Petalichnus capensis to Palmichnium due to the possession of four tracks and a medium line, the rest of the specimens were referred to Petalichnus brandenburgensis. The trackway of P. capensis is defined as medium-sized (largest track 13.6 cm, 5.4 in wide) and consists of several symmetrical series of four tracks, each formed by a simple oval or tear-shaped mark with small impressions on the sides, sometimes bilobed (divided into two lobes) and intermittent formed by closely spaced series. These tracks were located at a low angle with respect to the sometimes present median line, which is believed to be due to the telson ("tail") touching the substrate. The bilobed marks is thought to be "eight"-shaped due to the long spines of the sixth appendage of an onychopterellid eurypterid, presumably Onychopterella augusti, using a swimming stroke-like motion.

In 1983, Derek E. Gilmor Briggs and William D. Ian Rolfe described two new ichnospecies from Pennsylvania, P. kosinskiorum and P. stoermeri. The trace fossil of both ichnospecies were collected at a party from the Carnegie Museums of Pittsburgh in 1948. Its large size attracted the attention of the press, which attributed it to three-clawed amphibian hopping bipedally. The median line, the nature of the footprints and the lack of a suitable hopping vertebrate at the time rule out any hypothesis of an amphibian or vertebrate as the author of the footprints. In the case of invertebrates, it was concluded that only a large eurypterid that walked on six legs (hexapodous) could have produced the tracks.

Braddy erected in 1995 P. macdonaldi for Lower Permian trackways found in the Hueco Formation of New Mexico, becoming the youngest species of the ichnogenus. The specimens, including holotype P23404, are housed in the New Mexico Museum of Natural History and Science. The ichnospecies is named in honor of Jerry MacDonald, the discoverer and local collector of the ichnofauna of the Robledo Mountains. The prints had a width of 25 mm (1 in) and consisted of symmetrical series of three to four pairs of impressions, large paddle-shaped outer tracks of 12 mm (0.5 in) in length and two or three internal linear impressions. In front of some outer tracks there is a slight curvilinear impression slightly convex outwards, possibly representing the recovery of a stroke of an appendage. There are also present inner tracks, small and linear scritches. An intermittent median groove preserved in the middle of the trackway is situated between the outer tracks. The producer of the footprints was a small arthropod with long and paddle-shaped posterior appendages and with three pairs of appendages in front, using an in-phase gait. Due to these characteristics it has been suggested that the producer was Adelophthalmus luceroensis, which has been found in nearby deposits (Madera Formation, central New Mexico).

In 1843, the English geologist and paleontologist William Buckland described the now called BGS GSM 26037 (housed at the British Geological Survey in Nottingham, England) specimen as the result of the repeated impressions of three bony processes of the pectoral fin of an ambulatory (related or adapted to walk) fish, Icthyopatolites. The specimen was collected in Mostyn, Wales, and is Westphalian (Late Carboniferous) in age. However, in 1996, Braddy and Lyall I. Anderson recognized the track as clearly that of a moderately large (around 20 cm, 7.9 in long) hexapodous arthropod similar to the eurypterid traits that were described before in other papers, and named it Palmichnium pottsae. Although the leg morphology of the Carboniferous eurypterids is poorly known or completely unknown, the trackway fits with the maximum leg span of Adelophthalmus, approximately 10 cm (3.9 in). P. pottsae produced large trackways with asymmetric rows of three paired impressions along several irregular prints. It lacked a median line, but it has been suggested that this is due to the buoyancy of the water surrounding the abdomen of the animal or the active held up of the telson on the substrate without touching it, allowing better locomotion. The total length of the trackway was 37 cm (14.6 in). The outer tracks of the right and left series of the trackway were curvilinear or linear grooves, as well as the intermediate tracks, which were smaller than the outer ones. The internal tracks of both series were the smallest and with a bifid (cleft-like) form. There were also several irregular tracks that did not belong to any of the series. Although the assignment of P. pottsae to Palmichnium should mean the synonymy of Icthyopatolites with the first ichnogenus, Braddy and Anderson avoided formally synonymizing them because Buckland informally described Icthyopatolites and without an established diagnosis. Early Devonian trackways have also been found in Alken an der Mosel, Germany.
