= Sexual suggestiveness =

Sexually provocative material or action

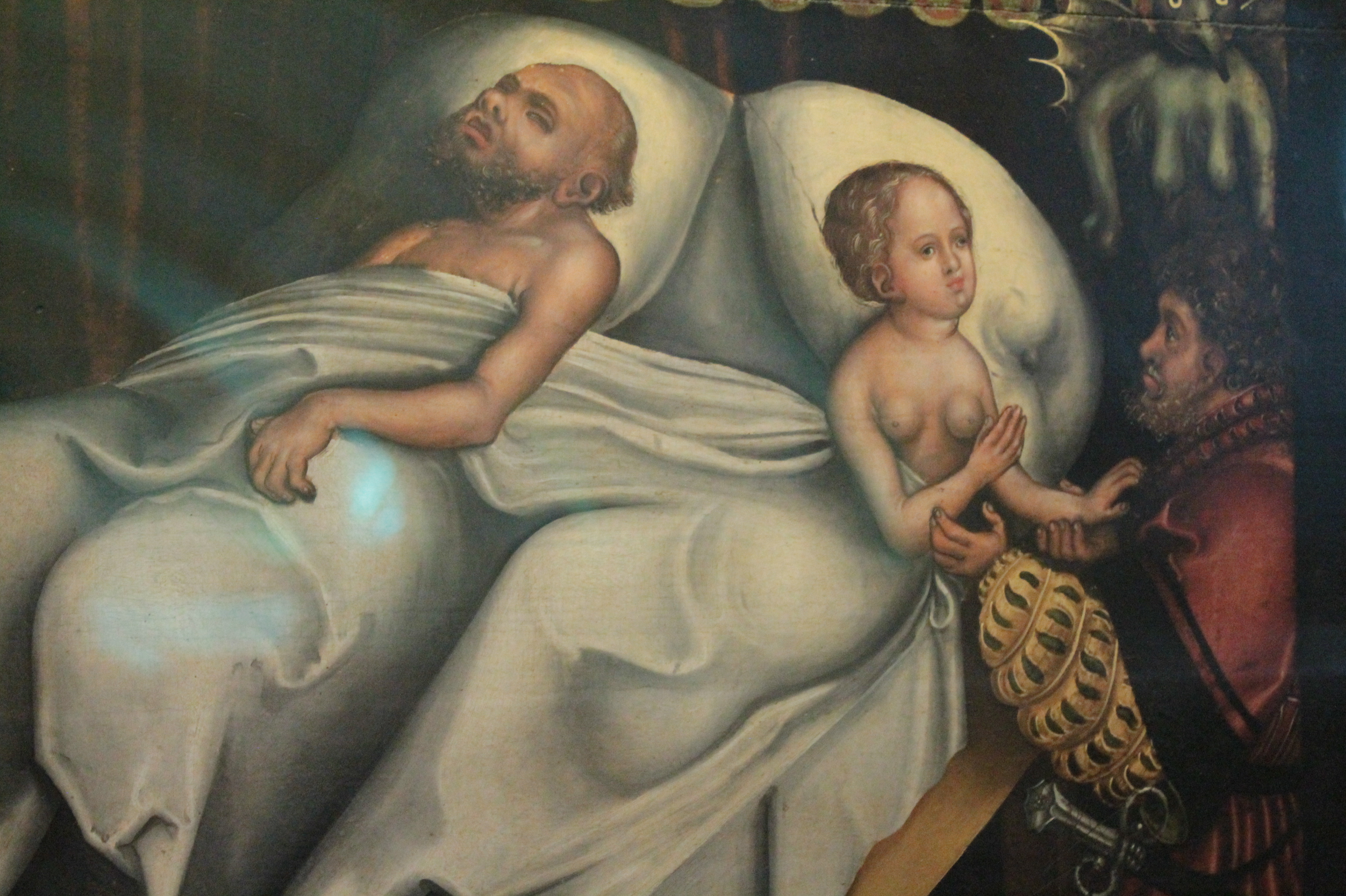
Refectory painting on the theme of Temptation by Lucas Cranach the Elder c. 1520 (detail), Lutherhaus, Wittenberg. This decorates the end wall of one of the main university refectories. Whilst the painting is already sexually charged, the aspect which requires a second glance is the woman's pillow, which is in a form suggesting a vulva in a woman.

Sexual suggestiveness is visual, verbal, written, or behavioral material or action with sexual undertones that imply sexual intent, with the aim of provoking sexual arousal.

There are variations in the perception and display of sexual suggestiveness, including but not limited to gender, culture and generation. Different cultures and different generations have varying views on what is considered to be sexually suggestive. For example, in the majority of Western cultures, it is normal for a woman to wear shorts and bare her legs on a hot, sunny day, but a woman with naked flesh exposed would be considered promiscuous in certain cultures around the world. In evolutionary terms, sexual suggestiveness is a mode from which sexual mates are gained. Therefore, the ability to use sexual suggestiveness effectively is a trait that is part of sexual selection.

Displays of sexual suggestiveness can exhibit a diverse variety, such as depictions of attractive women in swimsuit advertising, sexually themed music, sexting, erotic lingerie, or wolf whistling. Sexual suggestiveness may also involve nudity, or the exposure of the nipples, genitals, buttocks or other taboo areas of the body. Even a brand name or phrase can be considered to be sexually suggestive if it has strong sexual connotations or undertones.

In some cases, displays of sexual suggestiveness may be misinterpreted, which may lead to dangerous or harmful situations.

== Evolutionary perspective ==
From an evolutionary point of view, sexual suggestiveness evolved in order to aid in securing a sexual partner or mate. Once the individual has decided on a mate to pursue, sexual suggestiveness helps in attracting the mate; this is a skill which has been sexually selected (sexual selection) for during evolution. Sexually suggestive behaviors include things such as "showing more skin" and flirting. Both of these examples are behaviors which the individual would intentionally display. There is also research to suggest that sexually suggestive behaviors may not always be deliberate. Unbeknownst to the individual, factors such as the menstrual cycle, voice pitch and rate of money spending can all have an effect on sexual success and sexually suggestive behavior. For example, when women were in the workplace and ovulating, they were more likely to engage in sexually suggestive behaviors, e.g., showing more skin; further, women who work as lap dancers earn more money when they are in the ovulating stage. This may be because the female unwittingly behaves in a more sexual way and therefore puts out more sexually suggestive cues. There is not, however, any evidence to show that these women are aware that their actions or earnings are intrinsically linked to their menstrual cycle.

== 21st century ==
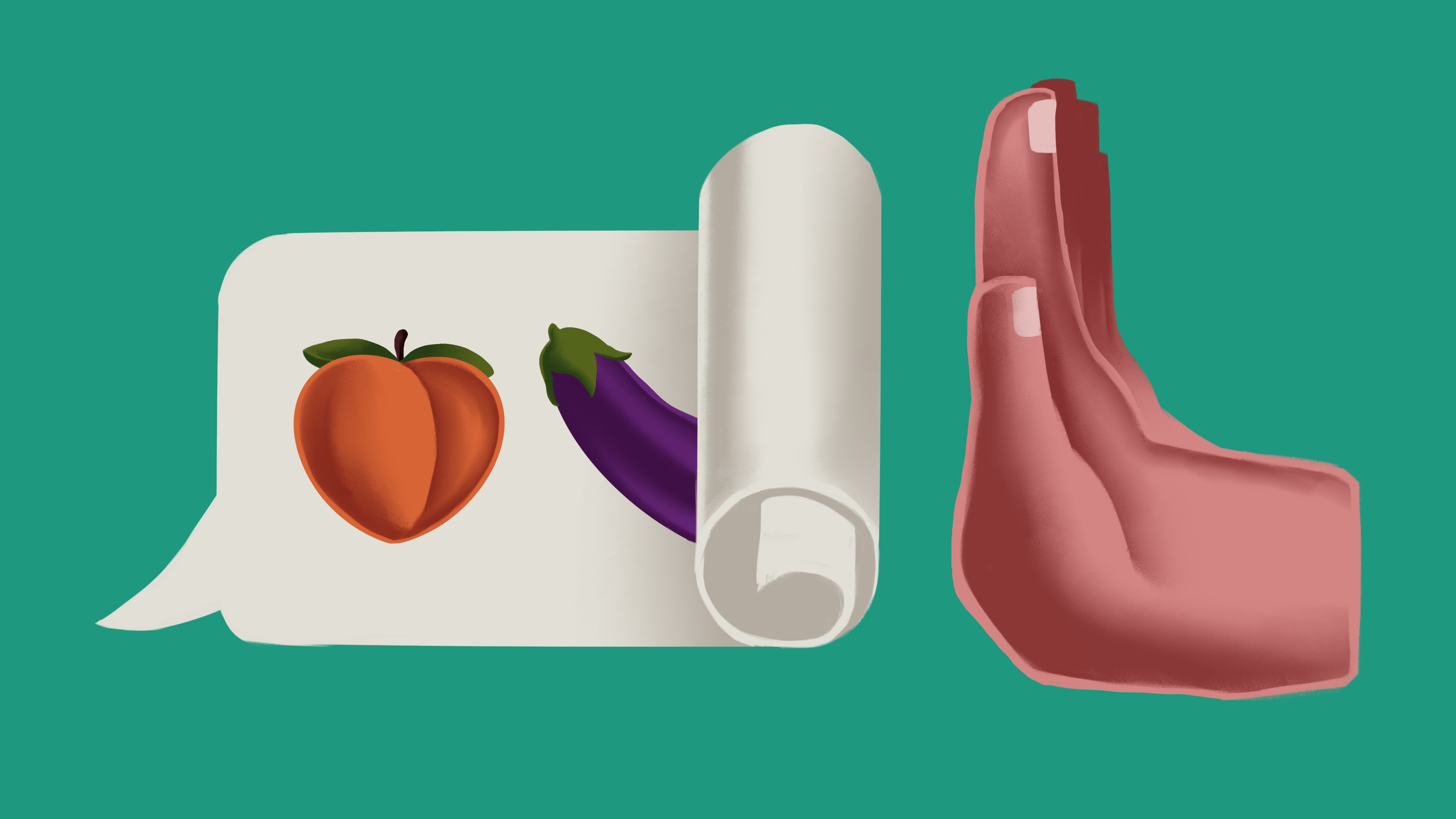
Drawing of a hand rejecting a chat bubble with a suggestive peach and eggplant emoji.

The rise of the media, advertising and film industries, as well as the growth of the fashion industry, are all contributing factors to increase sexually suggestive content in an everyday setting. There are far more displays of sexually suggestive behavior in modern-day life than there ever has been before and not just within advertising. The idea that sex sells is evident in many aspects of daily modern life, particularly within social media and film where female sexual ornaments are a focal point. For example, many films include additional sex scenes and sexually suggestive female characters regardless of the film's narrative.

The progression of the Internet and social media means that sexual content is far more available and accessible in the 21st century than ever before. This has a knock-on effect on people's sexualization and sexual behavior. Children's sexuality develops at an earlier age if they have been exposed to more sexual content when young. For example, young adolescents engage in more sexual behaviors if they have been exposed to more sexual content in the media or on television. On average, females become pubescent earlier in their development if they have been exposed to sexual content or sexual behavior. Most psychologists agree that this physical display of sexuality is due to evolutionary reasons and that girls develop their sexuality (e.g., behaving sexually suggestively) at an earlier age in order to sexually compete with other women and successfully reproduce.

== Misinterpretation ==
The increase in sexual content in modern society often results in a more nonchalant approach to sexually suggestive behavior. People, predominantly women, often act in a way that they themselves do not consider to be sexually suggestive but which can be misinterpreted by others. For example, wearing clothes or skirts/shorts that show skin is not something that most Western women would consider to be overtly provocative, but it is still regarded as sexually suggestive by others. Misconstruing people's behaviour can have disastrous consequences, contributing to harassment and rape culture.

Evolutionary psychology explains that this misinterpretation is the result of sexual selection. Men have adapted through sexual selection to have the maximum number of offspring possible, and therefore exhibit certain behaviors that facilitate maximum reproduction. Men perceive sexually suggestive behavior and other sexual cues, including biological ornaments, as signs of reproductive ability and willingness. The hypothesis of rape as an adaption states that the rape of reproductive-age females was favoured by direct selection in order to increase the chance of reproductive success. Sexually suggestive behavior and biological ornamentation are signs of sexual maturity and thus females who display more of these behaviors, or who have more obvious ornamentation, are more likely to be at a higher risk of harassment, or even rape. This evolutionary explanation also extends to women. At their most fertile stage in their menstrual cycle, during estrus, women are far less likely to engage in risk taking behaviors such as walking alone late at night, than women who are in the least fertile stage of their menstrual cycle, the luteal phase or women using hormonal contraception. This is because women who are in the luteal phase or women using a hormonal contraceptive are much less likely to become pregnant after sexual intercourse than estrus women are.

These evolutionary explanations serve only to increase the psychological understanding of sexual behaviors. Sexual suggestiveness, rape, and all other sexual behaviors, are evidenced to be products of past evolution. In the case of rape, however, just because some evidence indicates that it may be natural does not make it acceptable.

== Flirting ==
Flirting can be sexually suggestive, which can intentionally elicit a sexual response from another person. Research has identified different motivations for engaging in flirting behaviors. There is flirting with a sexual motivation, which is done with a view to engaging in human sexual activity and there is also flirting with a fun motivation, in which the interaction itself is the pleasurable part. An instrumental motivation of flirting behavior is flirting performed in order to accomplish an instrumental goal, such as getting someone to buy you a drink. However, flirting can sometimes lead to unintentional responses. If the motivation behind sexually suggestive behavior is misinterpreted or miscommunicated, then a sexual response could be elicited where it is not wanted. If escalated, this can lead to sexual harassment in the workplace or sexual coercion in a relationship. In line with evolutionary explanations of sexually suggestive behavior, research has shown that women are more likely to consider the use of flirting as being for relational purposes, and males are more likely to interpret female flirting as having a sexual motivation.

== Gender differences ==
There are some reported gender differences between how sexual suggestiveness is perceived. Males and females have different thresholds for the perception of sexual suggestiveness or intent. Males are, in general, more sexually occupied than females. To support this assumption, research shows that males perceive people as more interested in a sexual encounter than females do. It has also been suggested that males find it difficult to differentiate between liking, love and sexual intent, and in this case sexual suggestiveness. Unfortunately, this difficulty in separation between the two from the male's point of view may lead to rape or other sexual assault. During the evolution of human sexuality, the fact that females are the choosy gender meant that males who were able to quickly detect a female's willingness were the males who passed along their genes effectively. In light of this, males, therefore, tend to read sexual acceptance signals in friendly actions even when this may not be the females intention. Females are, however, better at reading platonic signals from the opposite sex and at differentiating between liking, loving and sexual suggestiveness.

There are also gender differences between how sexual suggestiveness is displayed via flirting. Recent research has shown that females are more likely than males to flirt with the intention of developing a new relationship, or with the intention of intensifying an existing relationship. It has also been found that females use flirting as a way of assessing the interest of a potential mate; as the end result is sexual activity, it can be inferred that this is a sexually suggestive act. On the other hand, a variety of different researchers have found that males are significantly more sexually motivated in their displays of sexual suggestiveness (such as flirting) than females. The research done by Clark and Hatfield (1989) supports these assumptions by clearly suggesting that female courtship is motivated by relationship development and that male courtship is motivated by sexual desire. It is these gender differences that can explain the potential miscommunication of social actions.

== Cultural differences ==
Since the 1990s, there has been a dramatic increase in the understanding of human sexuality from an evolutionary perspective. Evolutionary theory proposes that humans all behave in the same way, in order to maximise survival and reproductive success. However, as with much of human behavior, there are substantial differences in the sexual suggestiveness of people from different cultures. What may be a culturally appropriate display of 'sexiness' in one culture may be considered inappropriate in another, and vice versa. For example, in many Westernized cultures, women displaying their bare legs in public is considered to be a relatively unassuming display of suggestiveness, while in many African societies, for example, the same behavior would be considered immodest. It can be argued that religion is a significant factor in the cultural differences of sexual suggestiveness, especially with regards to what displays of suggestiveness are considered appropriate. In particular, some Christian and Muslim communities are more strict on what levels of suggestiveness are appropriate for unmarried young women.

== In the media ==
=== General ===
A considerable amount of research has concluded that sexually suggestive content is pervasive in the media. The most common type of sexually suggestive content in adolescent programming is in the form of a sexual innuendo. Sexual innuendoes give a suggestive alternative meaning to an otherwise neutral phrase. For example, the use of the phrase "bend over backwards" when describing a colleague, in the sitcom How I Met Your Mother, is used by the main character Barney to imply something in both a figurative sense (i.e. that she is willing to work hard) and a suggestive sense (alluding to her flexibility in sexual positions). Content analyses of sexual behavior in the media found that sexual content on television has risen from 45% in 1975 to 81% now. 83% of all programs on television contain sexual content. 80% of programs contain sexually suggestive references, and 49% of shows contain sexual behavior which include flirting. Sexual innuendoes occur as much as twice per program in popular American sitcoms, whilst flirting occurred at least once per programme. The use of sexual innuendoes in the media is also done through newspapers, magazines and music, and accounts for roughly 12% of the entire sexual content shown in the media overall. Analysis of sexually suggestive behavior in sports media showed that there was considerable gender differences in how sports stars are portrayed visually. For example, women are photographed nude more frequently than men, and were photographed in a hetero-sexy manner which was done to attract the male gaze, such as with sports equipment covering their genitalia due to its suggestive nature. Overall, women are portrayed in a manner that alludes to their status as a sex symbol.

Sexual content in the form of innuendo, suggestive imagery and double entendre is used as a tool in advertising. Suggestive advertising is used to draw in attention, by monopolizing attentional resources, and as a means of distinguishing their products from similar products which are usually advertised in the same medium (such as in the same magazine). Furthermore, advertisers use sexually suggestive material to imply an association between their product and benefits which are in some way related to sex (such as mate attraction). There was a significant increase in the amount of advertisements from 1983 to 2003 which used sexually suggestive images of models, suggesting that advertisers are finding it beneficial. While the physical properties of the model are the most sexually suggestive, a number of non-verbal communicative features have also been identified as being provocative, such as the models pose (plumped lips, cocked head to show the neck) as well as verbal communicative features such as suggestive comments.

=== Effects ===
A number of studies have looked at the effects of sexual content in the media on preadolescent and adolescent sexual development. It has been put forth that watching a high level of television, in which there is a lot of sexually suggestive behavior, can lead to the initiation of sexual intercourse at a younger age than those who watch the least amount of sexually suggestive programming. In addition to this, adolescents who had been exposed to a high level of sexual content would engage in a level of sexual activity expected by those up to three years older who watched less sexual content. It has been suggested that, according to social learning theory, television is a method by which children can acquire behaviors, through observational learning, and that this is a potential method through which children are becoming increasingly sexualized. Sexually transmitted infections (STIs) and pregnancy in the U.S. are more common among adolescents who begin sexual activity earlier, demonstrating that earlier sexualization, for which sexually suggestive content in the media has been implicated, has far-reaching effects.

Sexually suggestive content can also affect adolescents' views and attitudes towards sex, and their sexual socialization as whole. Research conducted with the cultivation theory in mind has found that there is an association between people with a high regular exposure to sexually oriented genres (such as soap operas and hip-hop music) and more liberal attitudes towards sexual behavior like the acceptance of premarital sex, as well as non-relational sex and sexual harassment. Furthermore, as sexual competence is portrayed as a positive attribute on television, particularly for males, regular exposure to sexual content can cause adolescents to form unrealistic expectations, and view their own sexual experiences (or lack thereof) as negative. Moreover, the vast majority of this sexual content alludes to the positive nature of sex only, suggesting that sexually suggestive behavior in the media is serving to perpetuate a view that there are little negative consequences of engaging in sexual activity. Research has shown that the effects of sexually suggestive references in the media are also moderated by the developmental stage of the viewer. For example, 12-year-olds have more difficulty correctly interpreting innuendos than 14-year-olds. Furthermore, prepubescent adolescents often view sexual references on television with disgust and embarrassment, whereas pubescent adolescents viewed it with interest.

== See also ==
- Antisexualism
- Censorship
- Index of human sexuality articles
- Indecent exposure
- Sexual ethics
- Twerking
