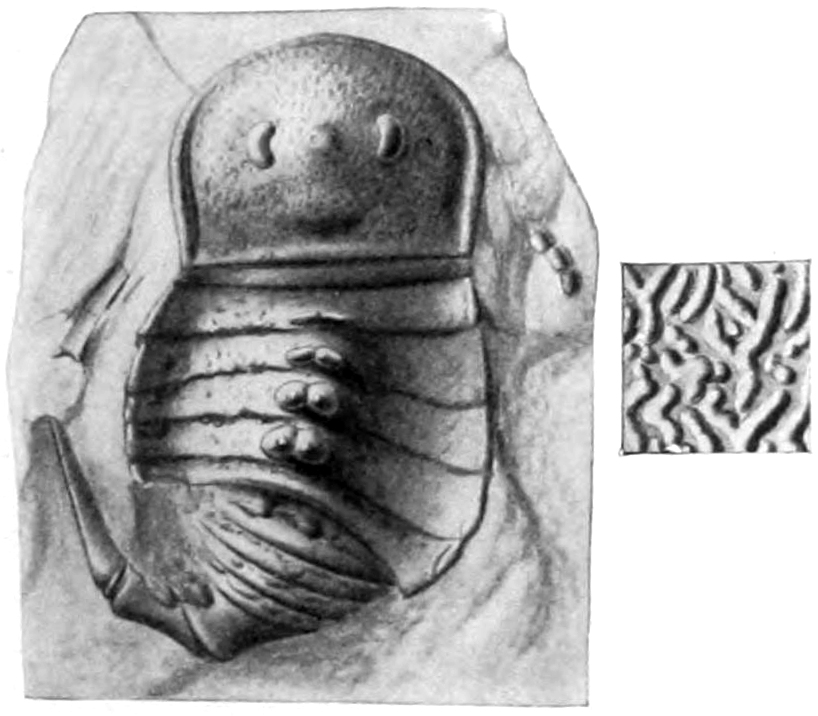
- Fossil of Tylopterella.

Scientific classification
- Kingdom: Animalia
- Phylum: Arthropoda
- Subphylum: Chelicerata
- Order: †Eurypterida
- Suborder: †Eurypterina
- Superfamily: †Onychopterelloidea; Lamsdell, 2011
- Family: †Onychopterellidae; Lamsdell, 2011

Type species
- †Onychopterella kokomoensis Miller & Gurley, 1896

Genera
- †Onychopterella; †Tylopterella

= Onychopterellidae =

Onychopterellidae Temporal range: Hirnantian–Ludlow

Extinct family of sea scorpions

Onychopterellidae are an extinct family of eurypterids. The family is the only family classified as part of the superfamily Onychopterelloidea. Genera included are Onychopterella and Tylopterella. Alkenopterus was once included in the Onychopterellidae but has since been classified in its own family, Alkenopteridae.

== See also ==
- List of eurypterids
