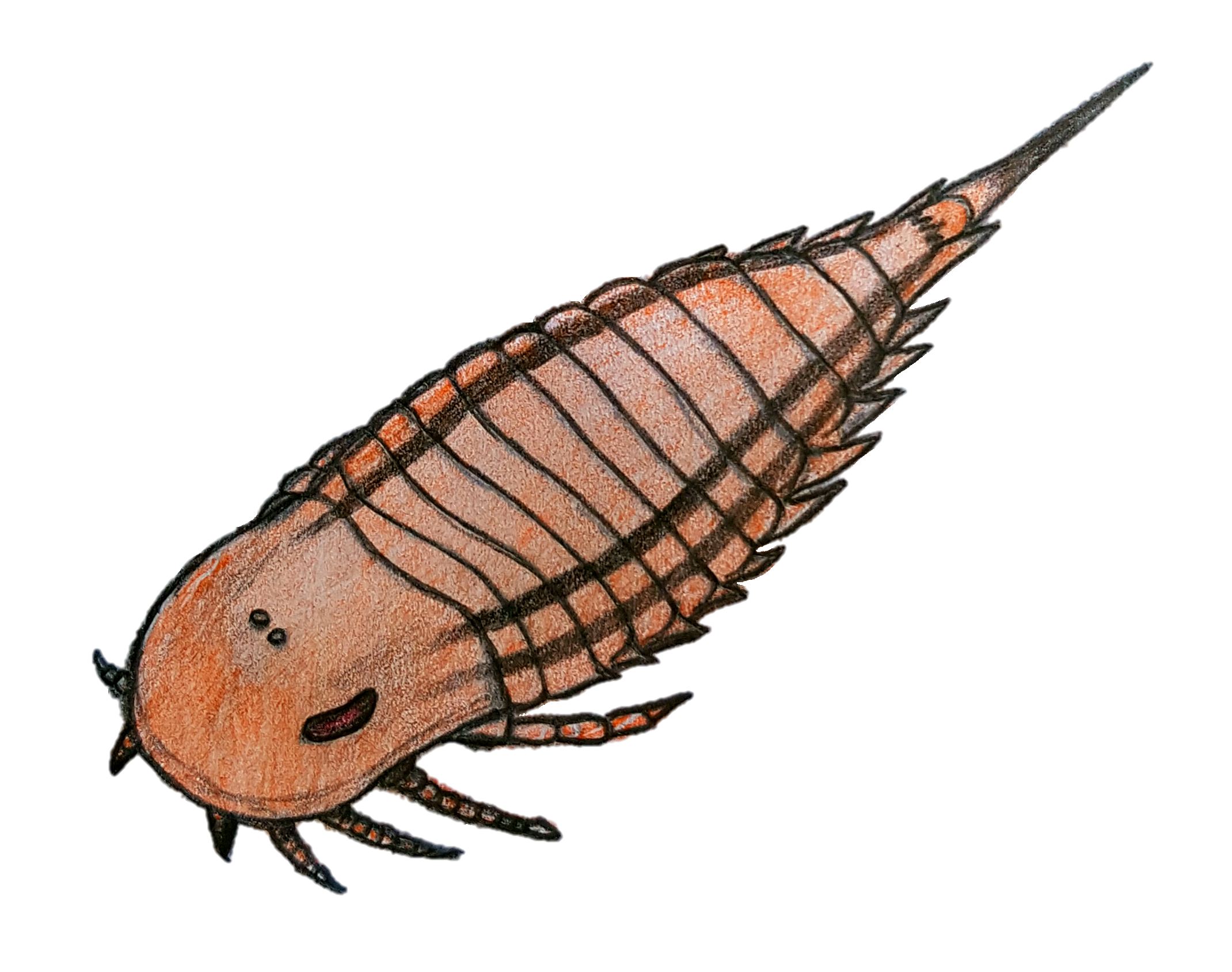
- Life restoration of S. conicus

Scientific classification
- Kingdom: Animalia
- Phylum: Arthropoda
- Subphylum: Chelicerata
- Order: †Eurypterida
- Superfamily: †Moselopteroidea
- Family: †Moselopteridae
- Genus: †Stoermeropterus; Lamsdell, 2011

Type species
- †Stoermeropterus conicus Laurie, 1892

Species
- †S. conicus Laurie, 1892; †S. latus Størmer, 1934; †S. nodosus Kjellesvig-Waering & Leutze, 1966

= Stoermeropterus =

Stoermeropterus Temporal range: Silurian

Extinct genus of sea scorpions

Stoermeropterus is a genus of prehistoric eurypterid from the Silurian period in Europe and North America classified as part of the Moselopteridae family. The genus contains three species, S. conicus and S. latus from Ringerike, Norway and S. nodosus from West Virginia.

== See also ==
- List of eurypterids
