= Vinetopterus =

Vinetopterus Temporal range: Late Pragian-Early Emsian, 409–406 Ma

Scientific classification
- Kingdom: Animalia
- Phylum: Arthropoda
- Subphylum: Chelicerata
- Order: †Eurypterida
- Superfamily: †Moselopteroidea
- Family: †Moselopteridae
- Genus: †Vinetopterus; Poschmann & Tetlie, 2004

Type species
- †Vinetopterus struvei Størmer, 1974

Species
- †V. martini Poschmann & Tetlie, 2004; †V. struvei Størmer, 1974

Extinct genus of Devonian organisms

Vinetopterus is a genus of prehistoric eurypterid from the Devonian period in Europe classified as part of the Moselopteridae family. The genus contains two species, both from Germany: V. struvei and V. martini.

== See also ==
- List of eurypterids
