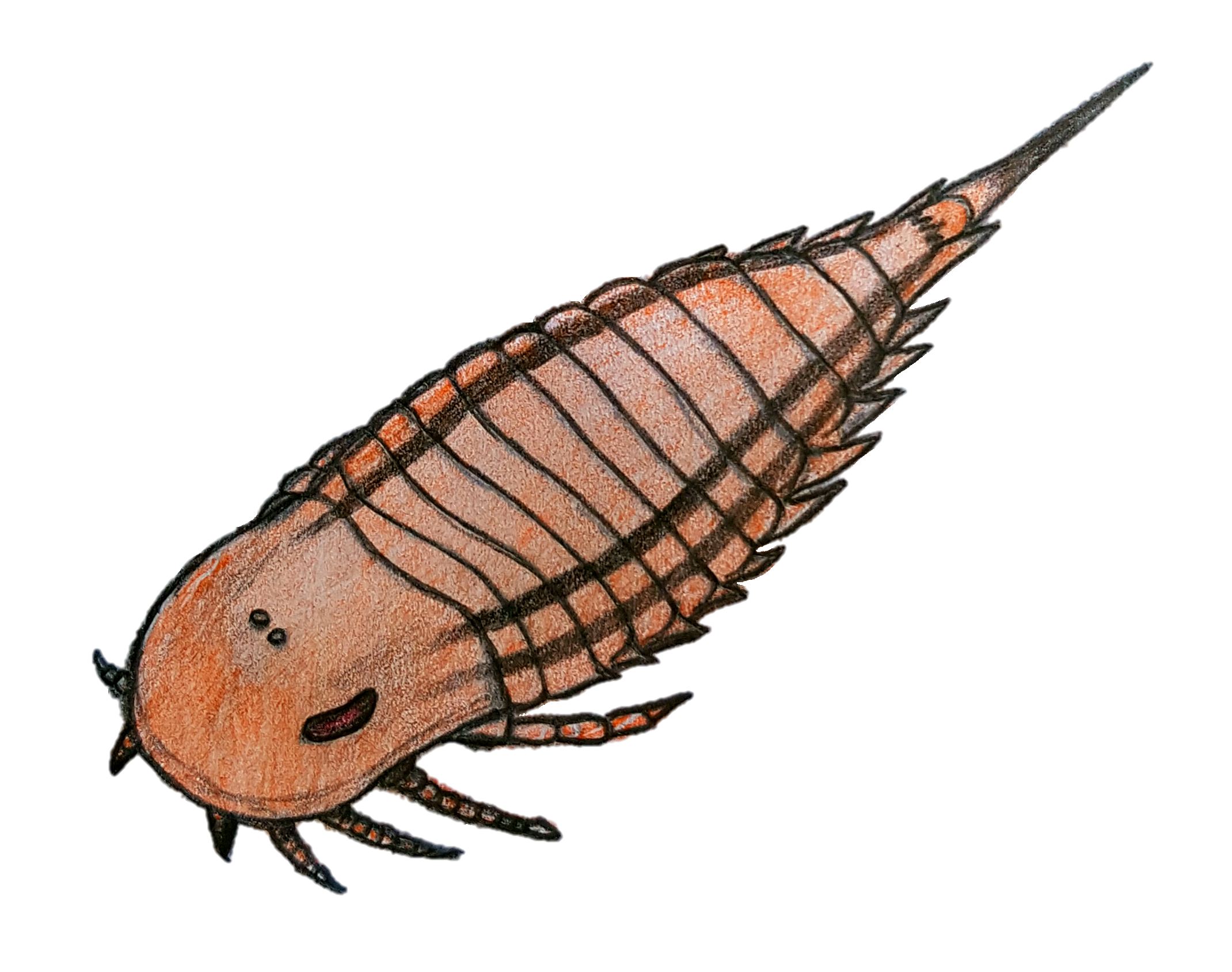
- Life restoration of Stoermeropterus

Scientific classification
- Kingdom: Animalia
- Phylum: Arthropoda
- Subphylum: Chelicerata
- Order: †Eurypterida
- Suborder: †Eurypterina
- Superfamily: †Moselopteroidea; Lamsdell, Braddy & Tetlie, 2010
- Family: †Moselopteridae; Lamsdell, Braddy & Tetlie, 2010

Genera
- †Moselopterus; †Stoermeropterus; †Vinetopterus

= Moselopteridae =

Moselopteridae Temporal range: Silurian–Devonian

Extinct family of sea scorpions

Moselopteridae are an extinct family of eurypterids. It is the only family classified as part of the superfamily Moselopteroidea, and contains three genera: Moselopterus, Stoermeropterus and Vinetopterus.

== See also ==
- List of eurypterids
