= Moselopterus =

Moselopterus Temporal range: Devonian

Scientific classification
- Kingdom: Animalia
- Phylum: Arthropoda
- Subphylum: Chelicerata
- Order: †Eurypterida
- Superfamily: †Moselopteroidea
- Family: †Moselopteridae
- Genus: †Moselopterus; Størmer, 1974

Type species
- †Moselopterus ancylotelson Størmer, 1974

Species
- †M. ancylotelson Størmer, 1974; †M. lancmani Delle, 1937

Extinct genus of arthropods

Moselopterus is a genus of prehistoric eurypterid from the Devonian period in Europe. The genus contains two species, M. ancylotelson from Germany and M. lancmani from Latvia.

A third species, M. elongatus, from the same deposits as M. ancylotelson, was previously recognized. M. elongatus differs from M. ancylotelson only in its larger size and more elongated body, and likely represents an older ontogenetic stage of the same species.

== See also ==
- List of eurypterids
