= Sundvollen Formation =

Geologic formation in Norway

- Stratigraphic range: Gorstian-Ludfordian (Rootsiküla); ~426.2–423 Ma
- Type: Formation
- Unit of: Ringerike Group
- Underlies: Stubdal Formation
- Overlies: Steinsfjorden Formation

Lithology
- Primary: Sandstone
- Other: Siltstone, shale

Location
- Coordinates: 59.9°N 10.8°E
- Approximate paleocoordinates: 16.9°S 7.3°W
- Region: Oslo Region, Ringerike
- Country: Norway
- Extent: North and eastern Steinsfjorden
- Sundvollen Formation (Norway)

The Sundvollen Formation is a geologic formation cropping out along the northern and eastern shores of Steinsfjorden, Oslo Region, Norway. It preserves fossils dating back to the Gorstian to Ludfordian stages (Rootsiküla in the regional stratigraphy) of the Late Silurian period.

== Description ==
The formation belongs to the Ringerike Group, overlies the Steinsfjorden Formation and is overlain by the Stubdal Formation. The fish assemblage originates from a horizon with fine-grained, dark greyish-green sandstone from the lowermost part of the formation.

The formation comprises dark-grey siltstones associated with red sandstones and siltstones, with ripple marks, cross-laminations, and crack diapirs, and pseudo-nodules, carbonate concretions. The sequence is fining upwards in cyclothems. Tracks attributed to eurypterids have been found in the red siltstone. Turner (1974) interprets the Sundvollen Formation as representing meandering, braided streams on an alluvial, coastal plain, very close to sea level because of the minor marine incursions found). Boucot and Janis (1983) interpreted the environment to be possibly brackish-estuarine.

== Fossil content ==
The following fossils have been reported from the formation:

=== Fish ===
- Ateleaspis sp.
- Loganellia cf. aldridgei
- Paralogania martinssoni
- Phlebolepis elegans
- Pterygolepis cf. nitida
- Rhyncholepis parvula
- Thelodus laevis
- Tyriaspis cf. whitei
- Osteostraci indet.

=== Eurypterids ===
- Brachyopterella pentagonalis
- Eurypterus tetragonophthalmus
- Kiaeropterus ruedemanni
- Mixopterus kiaeri
- Nanahughmilleria norvegica
- Pterygotus (Erettopterus)
- Erettopterus holmi
- Stylonuroides dolichopteroides
- Mixopterus sp.
- Nanahughmilleria sp.
- Pterygotus sp.

=== Invertebrates ===
Crustaceans

- Phyllocarida indet.

Chasmataspidids

- Kiaeria limuloides

Xiphosura

- Xiphosurida indet.
- Bunodes sp.

=== Flora ===
- Plantae indet.
- Dictyocaris slimoni.

== Correlations ==
The Sundvollen Formation correlates with the lower part of the Store Arøya Formation.

== See also ==
- List of fossiliferous stratigraphic units in Norway
