= Bertie Group =

Geological formation in Ontario, Canada

- Stratigraphic range: Pridoli (Cayugan Series); ~422.9–416.0 Ma
- Type: Geological group
- Unit of: Cayugan Series
- Sub-units: Falkirk (dolomite), Scajaquada (shale) and Williamsville (dolomite) - Western New York Fiddlers Green (dolomite), Forge Hollow (shale) and Oxbow (dolomite) - Central New York
- Underlies: Bois Blanc Formation, Helderberg Group, Bass Islands Group
- Overlies: Salina Group
- Thickness: Up to 495 ft (151 m)

Lithology
- Primary: Dolomite, Shale
- Other: Shale

Location
- Coordinates: 42.9°N 78.9°W
- Approximate paleocoordinates: 30.3°S 40.8°W
- Region: Ontario; New York
- Country: Canada, United States
- Extent: Appalachian Basin

Type section
- Named for: Bertie, Ontario
- Named by: Chapman
- Year defined: 1864
- Bertie Group (the United States) Bertie Group (New York)

The Bertie Group or Bertie Limestone, also referred to as the Bertie Dolomite and the Bertie Formation, is an upper Silurian (Pridoli, or Cayugan) geologic group and Lagerstätte in southern Ontario, Canada, and western New York State, United States. Details of the type locality and of stratigraphic nomenclature for this unit as used by the U.S. Geological Survey are available on-line at the National Geologic Map Database. The formation comprises dolomites, limestones and shales and reaches a thickness of 495 feet (151 m) in the subsurface, while in outcrop the group can be 60 feet (18 m) thick.

The group represents the uppermost unit of the Cayugan Series and the youngest Silurian unit in Ontario. The group overlies the Salina Group and is conformably overlain by the Devonian Bois Blanc Formation in Ontario and Onondaga Limestone in New York.

Two formations within the Bertie Group, the Fiddler's Green and Williamsville, are considered Konservat-Lagerstätten; geologic units that contain a unique and typically soft-bodied fauna. These formations have produced thousands of Silurian eurypterids (sea scorpions) as well as early scorpion Proscorpius osborni, xiphosurans, primitive fossil flora, the planktonic cephalodiscid Rotaciurca superbus and the fish Nerepisacanthus denisoni. The excellent preservation of the many eurypterids and other taxa was the possibly result of periodic hypersaline and anoxic conditions owing to the group's position within a shallow inland sea (the Appalachian basin).

== Description ==
The type locality for the Bertie Group is Ridgemount Quarry, located west of Fort Erie on the Niagara Peninsula of Bertie, Ontario, 6 miles (9.7 km) west of Buffalo, New York, after which the group is named. The first author who recognized the group as a separate stratigraphic unit was Chapman in 1884. In more recent years, the unit has been elevated to group status.

== Geographic extent ==
The Bertie Group forms the bedrock in a narrow band extending from Fort Erie, west of Buffalo, New York, through Hagersville, New Hamburg, Harriston, and Walkerton to Southampton on Lake Huron. The group consists of medium- to massive-bedded aphanitic brown to grey, laminated, bituminous and burrowed dolomites, with minor thin-bedded shaly dolomites.

Along the outcrop area between Fort Erie and Hagersville, the thickness varies from 35 to 60 feet (11 to 18 m). It thickens to 495 feet (151 m) in the subsurface. Sanford (1969) used the term Bertie Group from Fort Erie to the vicinity of Hagersville and the term Bass Islands Formation north and west of Hagersville. The group is correlated with the Bass Islands Formation of Michigan. Bertie Group dolomite is quarried for crushed stone at Fort Erie, Port Colborne, Dunnville, Cayuga, and Hagersville.

== Stratigraphy ==
The Bertie Group is the uppermost unit in the Cayugan Series and forms part of the Tippecanoe II sequence. At its type locality, the group is subdivided into several formations. In central New York, the Group is subdivided into the Fiddlers Green Dolomite, Forge Hollow Shale, and Oxbow Dolomite members, from oldest to youngest. Here, the Bertie Group is overlain by the Honeoye and Chrysler formations. In New York, the Onondaga Limestone overlies the Bertie Group. The group is in Ontario conformably overlain by the Middle Devonian Bois Blanc Formation.

Laterally, the group is equivalent to the Bass Islands Formation and is mapped as a combined stratigraphic unit. Haynes and Parkins (1992) reported that the Bertie Group is progressively cut by the Bass Islands Formation from Dunnville to Hagersville. In Pennsylvania, the Bertie Group is time-equivalent with the Keyser Formation.

== Paleobiota ==
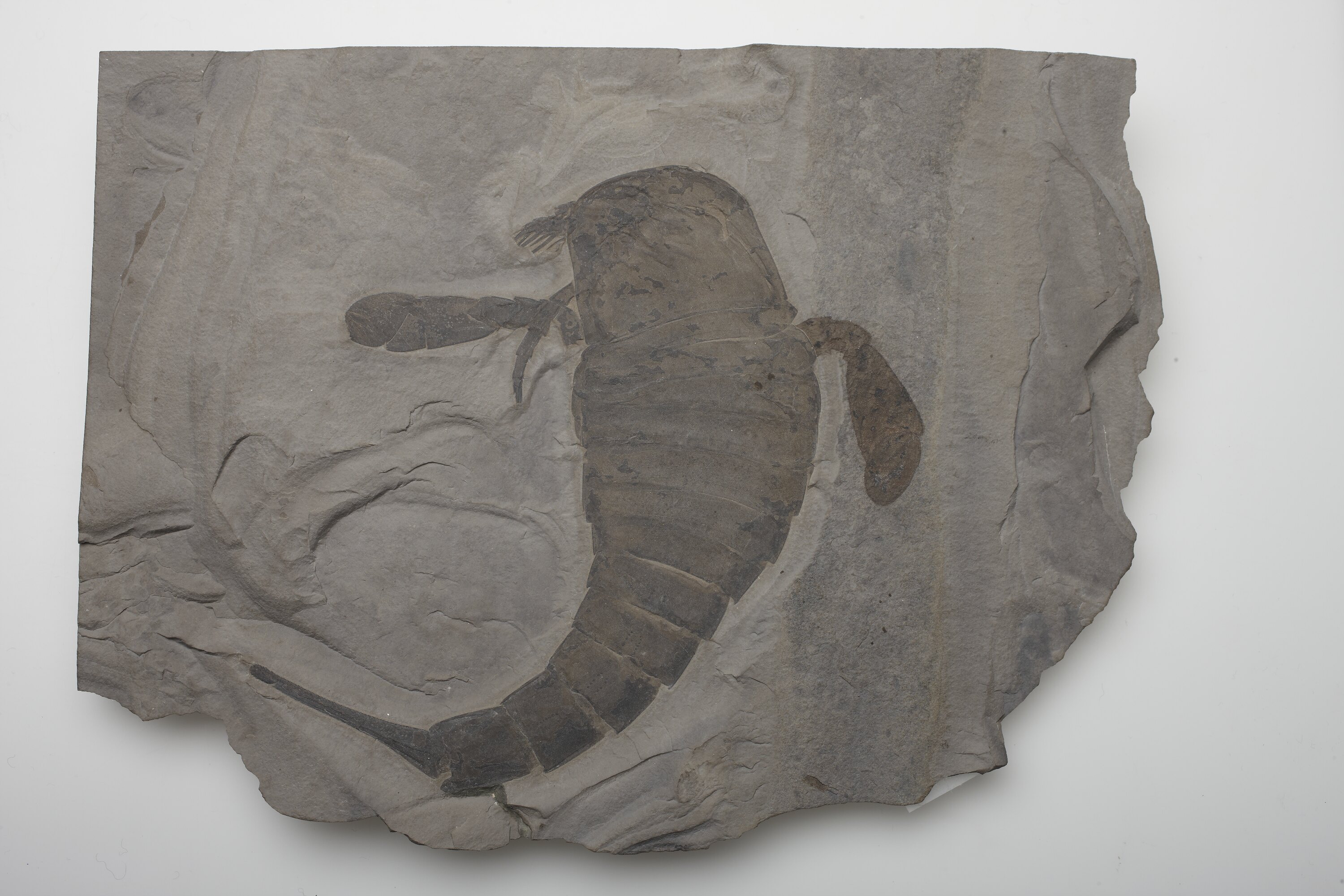
An Eurypterus fossil found in the Fiddlers Green Formation.

The Bertie Group Fiddler's Green and Williamsville formations are considered Konservat-Lagerstätten; units characterized by rare and typically soft-bodied fauna. These formations have produced thousands of fossil eurypterids (sea scorpions) since collecting began in earnest in the mid-20th century. Other fossils from the unit include early scorpion Proscorpius osborni, early flora, and a fossil fish; Nerepisacanthus denisoni. The excellent preservation of the many eurypterids possibly was the result of periodic hypersaline and anoxic conditions.

Color key
Taxon	Reclassified taxon	Taxon falsely reported as present	Dubious taxon or junior synonym	Ichnotaxon	Ootaxon	Morphotaxon

Notes
Uncertain or tentative taxa are in small text; ~~crossed out~~ taxa are discredited.

=== Arthropods ===
Genus	Species	Member/Formation	Notes	Image
Acutiramus	A. macrophthalmus	Fiddlers Green; Phelps Member/Ellicott Creek Breccia; Williamsville		
Acutiramus	A. cummingsi	Williamsville		
Buffalopterus	B. pustulosus	Williamsville; Fiddlers Green; Phelps Member/Ellicott Creek Breccia		
Bunaia	B. woodwardi	Williamsville	A Offacolid Chelicerate.	
Carcinosoma	C. scorpionis	Williamsville	Renamed as Cruinnopterus	
Ceratiocaris	C. acuminata	Williamsville		
Ceratiocaris	C. maccoyanus	Unknown		
Ceratiocaris	C. praecedens	Unknown		
Cruinnopterus	C. scorpionis	Williamsville	A Carcinosomatid Eurypterid originally described under the genus Carcinosoma.	
Clarkeipterus	C. testudineus	Fiddlers Green; Phelps Member/Ellicott Creek Breccia; Williamsville	A Dolichopterid Eurypterid originally described as Dolichopterus? testudineus	
Diploaspis	D. praecursor	Fiddlers Green; Phelps Member	A Chasmataspidid Chelicerate.	
Dolichopterus	D. herkimerensis	Fiddlers Green; Moran Corner	A Dolichopterid originally referred to D.? testudineus from Cranes Corners.	
Dolichopterus	D. jewetti	Fiddlers Green; Ellicott Creek Breccia/Phelps Member	A Dolichopterid Eurypterid.	
Dolichopterus	D. macrocheirus	Williamsville	A Dolichopterid Eurypterid.	
Dolichopterus	D. siluriceps	Fiddlers Green; Williamsville	Considered a Junior Synonym of C. macrocheirus	
Dolichopterus	D. sp	Moran Corner; Akron/Cobleskil; Williamsville; Ellicott Creek Breccia/Phelps		
Emmelezoe	E. minnuta	Unknown	Emmelezoe has been regarded as a junior synonym of Ceratiocaris.	
Erieopterus	E. pustulosus			
Eurypterus	E. dekayi	Williamsville; Moran Corner		
Eurypterus	E. laculatus	Cobleskill		
Eurypterus	E. lacustris	Williamsville; Moran Corner; Akron/Cobleskill; Fiddlers Green; Phelps Member/Ellicott Creek Breccia		
Eurypterus	E. remipes	Fiddlers Green; Phelps Member/Ellicott Creek Breccia; Vernon Member		
Eusarcana	E. scorpionis	Williamsville		
Gonatocaris	G. sp.			
Limuloides?	L. eriensis	Williamsville	likely a Bunodid but its fragmentary nature makes generic identification difficult.	
Naraoia	N. bertiensis	Williamsville		
Naraoia	N. cf. bertiensis	Fiddlers Green; Phelps Member		
Proscorpius	P. osborni	Fiddlers Green; Phelps Member/Ellicott Creek Breccia		
Pseudoniscus	P. clarkei	Fiddlers Green		
Pseudoniscus	P. roosevelti	Unknown		
Pterygotus	P. cobbi	Williamsville; Fiddlers Green; Phelps Member/Ellicott Creek Breccia; Falkirk?		
Pterygotus	P. juvensis	Fiddlers Green	Reinterpreted as juveniles of A. macrophthalmus	
Erettopterus	E. sp.	Fiddlers Green		
Erettopterus	E. grandis	Fiddlers Green		
Rhinocarcinosoma	R. sp.	Williamsville		
Ostracods	Eukloedenella umbilicata	Fiddlers Green		
	Leperditia alta, L. scalaris	Fiddlers Green		
	Zygobeyrichia cf. regina	Fiddlers Green		

=== Acanthodians ===
Genus	Species	Member/Formation	Notes	Image
Nerepisacanthus	N. denisoni	Williamsville	The only vertebrate found in the Bertie Group	

=== Annelids ===
Group	Fossils	Member/Formation	Notes	Image
Machaeridians	Lepidocoleus reinhardi	Fiddlers Green		
Serpulites	sp.			

=== Molluscs ===
Genus	Species	Member/Formation	Notes	Image
Dawsonoceras	D. oconnellae	Fiddlers Green		
Gomphoceras	Gomphoceras ruedemanni	Fiddlers Green		
Mitroceras	M. gebhardi	Fiddlers Green		
Pristeroceras	P. timidum	Unknown (Buffalo, NY)		
Trochoceras	T. cf. anderdonense	Fiddlers Green		
Orthoceras	O. sp.	Fiddlers Green		
Orthoceras	O. vicinus	Unknown		
Phragmoceras	Phragmoceras sp.	Fiddlers Green		
Loxonema	Loxonema bertiense	Fiddlers Green		
	Mesocoelia gregaria	Fiddlers Green		
	Platyceras (Platyostoma) sp.	Fiddlers Green		
Hercynella	"H." buffaloensis	Fiddlers Green		
	Modiolopsis dubius	Fiddlers Green		
	Goniophora sp.	Fiddlers Green		
	Nuculites sp.	Fiddlers Green		
Rhytimya	R. buffaloensis	Fiddlers Green		

=== Cnidarians ===
Genus	Species	Member/Formation	Notes	Image
Bertratis	B. ciurcae	Fiddlers Green; Phelps Member; Williamsville		

=== Pterobranchs ===
Group	Fossils	Member/Formation	Notes
Climacograptus	C. ultimus	Unknown (Buffalo, NY)	
Palaeodictyota	P. buffaloensis	Fiddlers Green	
Ascograptus	A. sp.	Fiddlers Green	
Orthograptus	O. sp.	Unknown	
Rotaciurca	R. superbus	Williamsville	

Polychaeta	Serpulites sp.	Fiddlers Green
Polychaeta	Spirorbis sp.	Fiddlers Green
Rhynchonellata	Camarotoechia cf. andrewsi	Fiddlers Green
	Reticularia (Prosserella) modestoidea	Fiddlers Green
	Howellella eriensis	Fiddlers Green
	Whitfieldella sulcata	Fiddlers Green
Delthyris	Delthyris sp.	Fiddlers Green
Delthyris	Delthyris eriensis	
Edrioasteroidea	Pyrgocystis batheri	Fiddlers Green
Strophomenata	Schuchertella sp.	Fiddlers Green
Bryozoans	Hernodia sp.	Fiddlers Green
Bryozoans	Reptaria sp.	Fiddlers Green
Bryozoans	Stigmatella sp.	Fiddlers Green
Lingulata	Lingula semina, L. subtrigona	Fiddlers Green
Lingulata	Orbiculoidea cf. numulus	Fiddlers Green
Lingulata	Orbiculoidea bertiensis	
Scyphozoa	Metaconularia perglabra	Unknown (Buffalo, NY)
Anthozoa	Aulocystis sp.	Fiddlers Green
Anthozoa	?Ceratopora sp.	Fiddlers Green
Stromatoporoidea	Stromatopora constellata	Fiddlers Green

=== Flora ===
Genus	Species	Member/Formation	Notes	Image
Cooksonia	Cooksonia cf. hemisphaerica	Fiddlers Green; Phelps Member		
Cooksonia	Cooksonia sp.	Williamsville; Fiddlers Green; Phelps Member		
Hostinella	H. silurica			
Hostinella	H. sp.	Williamsville; Fiddlers Green; Phelps Member		
Inocaulis	I. lesqueureuxi	Williamsville		
Dasycladophyceae	Medusaegraptus graminiformis	Fiddlers Green		
Morania	M. bertiensis	Unknown		
	Calithamnopsis silurica	Fiddlers Green		

== Age ==
The Bertie Formation is late Silurian (Pridoli, or Cayugan in the local chronologies).

== Interpretations of depositional environments ==
The Appalachian Foreland basin was formed during the Alleghanian orogeny in the Early to Middle Ordovician. The period of mountain building led to the closure of the Iapetus and Rheic Oceans. Due to tectonic loading, the foreland basin developed in the present-day area north of the Appalachian Mountains. The late Silurian climate was arid and warm; this, and the restricted and shallow nature of the inland basin, resulted in the deposition of evaporites in the Salina Group, ranging in thickness from 120 to 800 metres (390 to 2,620 ft). Zones of stromatolites and thrombolites (non-laminated algal mounds) occur in several formations in the Bertie Group, along with numerous desiccation cracks. During the Hercynian orogeny in the Devonian, many of the Silurian sediments were eroded to the south in the Appalachians, while north of the mountains the Silurian units were preserved.

The sediments of the Bertie Group were deposited on the paleosouthern side of the subsiding Algonquin Arch, flanking the northern rim of the Appalachian foreland basin of Laurentia.

The Bertie Group was deposited in a hypersaline marine environment. The stratigraphic sections and the fossil content suggest that the group was deposited in a near-shore marine to lagoonal setting, and the evaporites and casts of halite pseudomorphs, with sides of up to 30 centimetres (12 in), suggest the environment was far from normal marine; hypersalinity must have prevailed throughout most of the depositional history of the group. Alternating hypersaline and brackish estuarine conditions have been recorded in the group. The dolomitization of the group most probably was not primary.

== See also ==
- List of fossiliferous stratigraphic units in New York
- List of fossiliferous stratigraphic units in Ontario
- Tonoloway Formation, contemporaneous formation of Pennsylvania, Maryland, Virginia and West Virginia
- Tymochtee Dolomite, contemporaneous dolomite formation of Ohio
- Catavi Formation, contemporaneous fossiliferous formation of Bolivia
- Peel Sound Formation, contemporaneous fossiliferous formation of Nunavut, Canada
- Stony Mountain Formation, Late Ordovician Lagerstätte of Manitoba, Canada
- Lau event, Late Silurian extinction event preceding the Bertie fauna
