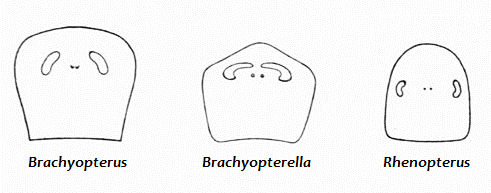
- The carapace of Brachyopterella compared to that of other rhenopterids Brachyopterus and Rhenopterus, showing its distinct pentagonal shape.

Scientific classification
- Kingdom: Animalia
- Phylum: Arthropoda
- Subphylum: Chelicerata
- Order: †Eurypterida
- Family: †Brachyopterellidae
- Genus: †Brachyopterella; Kjellesvig-Waering, 1966

Species
- B. pentagonalis Størmer, 1934 (type species); B. ritchiei Waterston, 1979

Synonyms
- Brachyopterus pentagonalis Størmer, 1934

= Brachyopterella =

Brachyopterella Temporal range: Silurian, 428.2–418.7 Ma

Extinct genus of arthropods

Brachyopterella is a genus of prehistoric eurypterid classified as part of the Brachyopterellidae family. Two species, both from the Silurian period, are known; B. pentagonalis from Norway and B. ritchei from Scotland.

== Description ==
Brachyopterella was a small stylonurine eurypterid with a pentagonal carapace with little to no marginal rim and a concave base. The eyes were oblique, very long, banana-shaped, close-set and placed anteriorly on the carapace. Axes converged and crossed a short distance in front of the eyes. The ocelli were placed well forward between the eyes and the epistoma was well developed. The legs increased in size gradually, with the first three having short opposable spines at the end of each joint and the last two walking legs being longer but lacking spines. The carapace was smooth and the legs were covered in granulations. The metasoma is unknown.

== Classification ==
Brachyopterella pentagonalis was originally named as a species of the closely related Brachyopterus, differences in the shape of the carapace and the eyes allowed them to be separated into different genera.

== Species ==
Brachyopterella contains two valid species, with one other species turning out to have been a pseudofossil.

- Brachyopterella pentagonalis Størmer, 1934 - Ringerike, Norway (Silurian)
- Brachyopterella ritchiei Clarke & Ruedemann, 1912 - Slot Burn, Scotland (Silurian)

Invalid or reassigned species are listed below:

- Brachyopterella magna Clarke & Ruedemann, 1912 - New York (Ordovician), a pseudofossil.

== See also ==
- List of eurypterids
