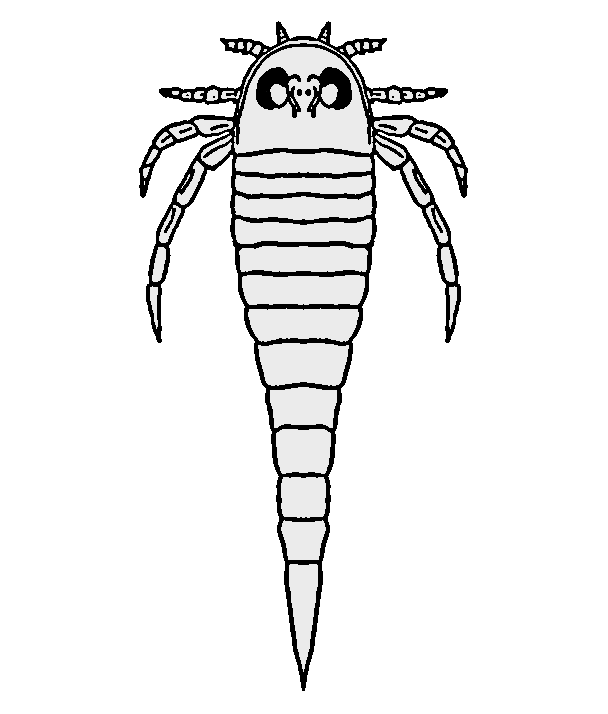
- Kiaeropterus

Scientific classification
- Kingdom: Animalia
- Phylum: Arthropoda
- Subphylum: Chelicerata
- Order: †Eurypterida
- Suborder: †Stylonurina; Størmer, 1951
- Superfamily: †Rhenopteroidea; Størmer, 1951

Families and genera
- †Brachyopterellidae; †Brachyopterella; †Kiaeropterus; †Brachyopteridae; †Brachyopterus; †Rhenopteridae; †Rhenopterus; †Stylonuroides

Synonyms
- Brachyopterelloidea Tollerton, 1989

= Rhenopteroidea =

Rhenopteroidea Temporal range: Sandbian–Emsian

Extinct superfamily of arthropods

The Rhenopteroidea is an extinct superfamily of eurypterids, an extinct group of chelicerate arthropods commonly known as "sea scorpions". The superfamily is one of four superfamilies classified as part of the suborder Stylonurina. Previously considered to consist only of the family Rhenopteridae, the superfamily was in 2025 divided into three families: Rhenopteridae, Brachyopteridae, and Brachyopterellidae.

The Rhenopteroidea contains one of the earliest known eurypterids, Brachyopterus, known from the Middle Ordovician (also the sister taxon to all other rhenopteroids), and is the most primitive clade of stylonurine eurypterids. The last known members of the family went extinct during the Early Devonian.

== Description ==
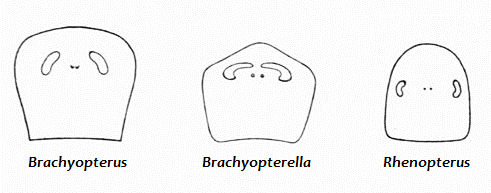
Comparison of the carapaces of three rhenopteroid genera; Brachyopterus, Brachyopterella and Rhenopterus.

Rhenopteroids were small, characterized by scattered tubercules and knobs on the outer surface of the exoskeleton. Their first two (or possibly three) pairs of walking legs had spines; the last two pairs were long and powerful, without spines. The prosoma (head) was subtrapezoidal, with arcuate compound eyes on parallel axes. The male genital appendages were short with two distal spines.

The rhenopteroids were the most primitive stylonurines and the family encompasses many previously enigmatic eurypterids, such as Brachyopterus, Kiareopterus and Rhenopterus itself, all united by a rounded posterior margin to the metastoma and prosomal appendage III bearing single fixed spines.

Unlike the derived stylonurines of the family Stylonuridae and superfamily Hibbertopteroidea, rhenopteroids retained primitive Hughmilleria-type prosomal appendages II-IV, which are unsuited to sweep-feeding. The family is thus more likely to have adopted a scavenging lifestyle.

== Evolutionary history ==
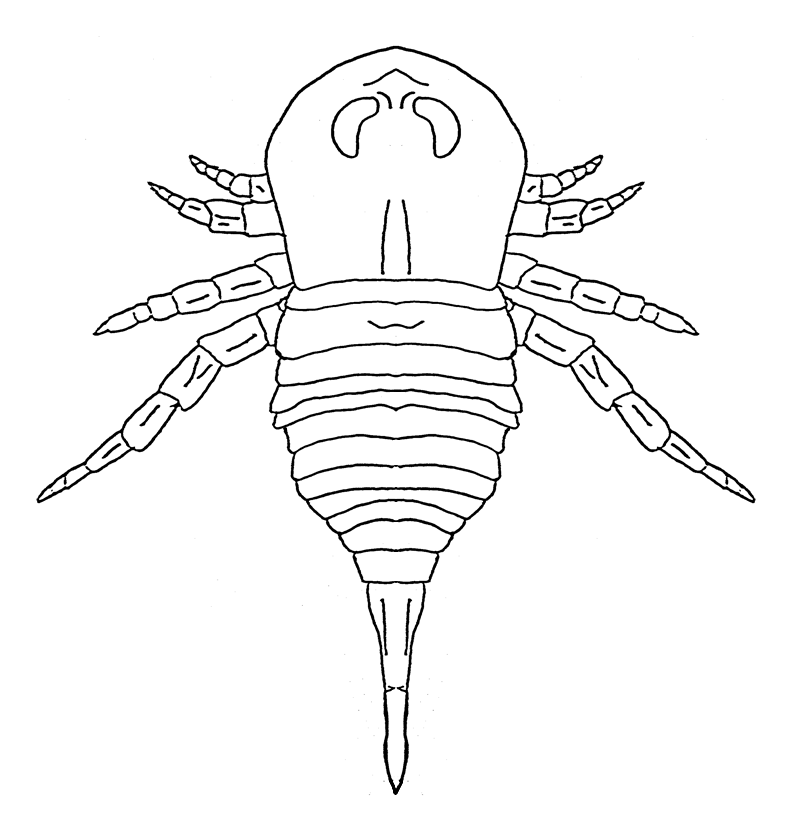
Reconstruction of Brachyopterus, the earliest known rhenopteroid.

The Rhenopteroids first appeared during the Middle Ordovician as one of the earliest and most basal groups of Stylonurine eurypterids. Clear evolutionary trends can be observed in the carapaces of the rhenopteroids. Basal rhenopteroids possess broad carapaces narrowest at their base (as in Brachyopterus and Brachyopterella) whilst more derived rhenopteroids have broad carapaces narrowest at the front and the most derived members possess narrower carapaces narrowest at the front (as in Rhenopterus). Kiaeropterus is unusual in its morphology and might represent a Silurian offshoot.

== Systematics and genera ==
The Rhenopteroids are diagnosed as being stylonurines with the posterior margin of the metastomate being round. Rhenopteroids are in turn rhenopteroids with single fixed spines on the prosomal appendage III and possess a short telson. The Appendages II-IV have short and fixed spines and V-VI are nonspiniferous. Since no currently known rhenopteroid challenge the diagnosis applied to the Rhenopteroidae, all rhenopteroids are rhenopteroids.

Lamsdell, Braddy and Tetlie (2010) assigned one subfamily to the Rhenopteridae (then defined as the only family in the superfamily), the Rhenopterinae, including the genera Alkenopterus and Rhenopterus. The Rhenopterinae was restricted to the Early to Middle Devonian and were diagnosed as being rhenopteroids with a non-spiniferous appendage IV and a caudal postabdomen. More recently, Alkenopterus has been reclassified as a member of the Onychopterellidae within the Eurypterina, making the subfamily defunct.

Lamsdell (2025) divided the Rhenopteroidea into three families:

Superfamily Rhenopteroidea Størmer, 1951

- Family Brachyopterellidae Tollerton, 1989
  - Brachyopterella Kjellesvig-Waering, 1966
  - Kiaeropterus Waterston, 1979
- Family Brachyopteridae Lamsdell, 2025
  - Brachyopterus Størmer, 1951
- Family Rhenopteridae Størmer, 1951
  - Rhenopterus Størmer, 1936
  - Stylonuroides Kjellesvig-Waering, 1966
