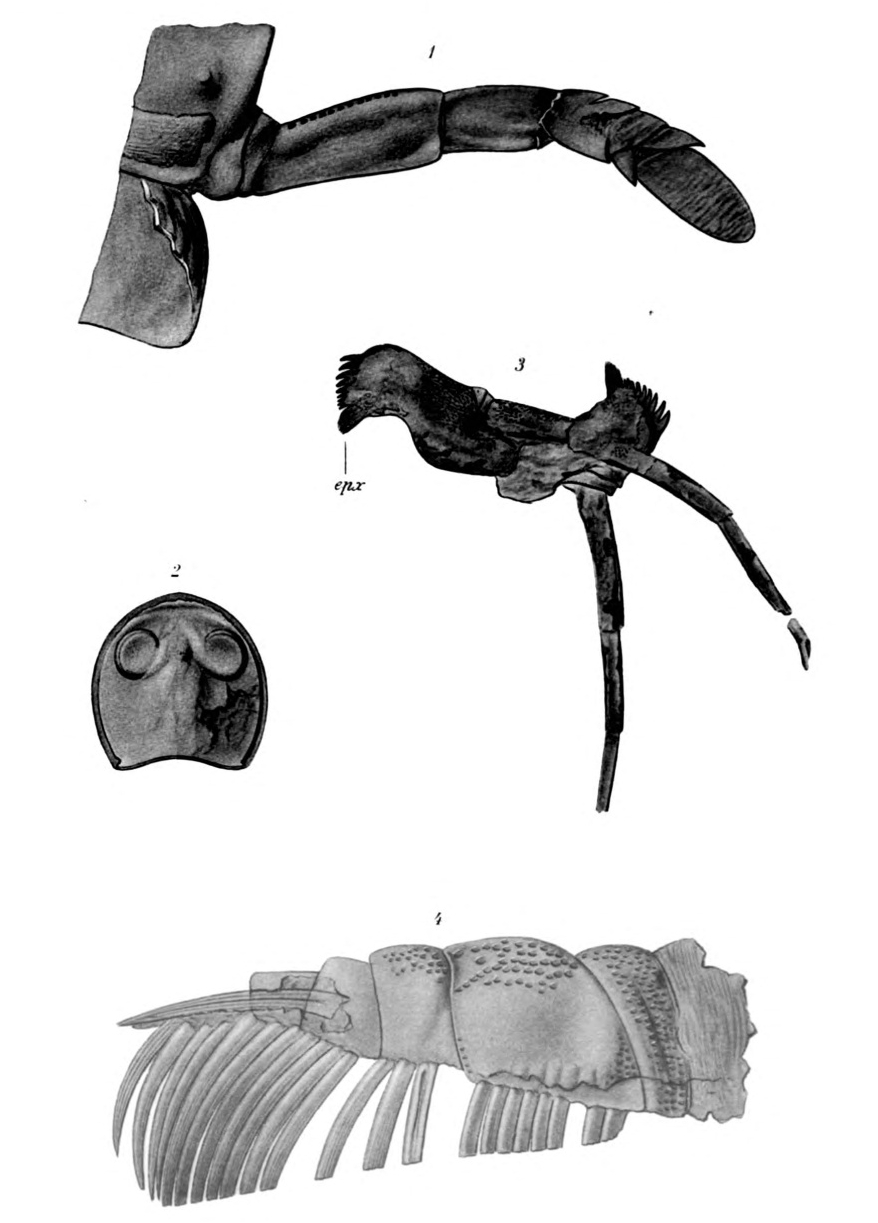
- Clarkeipterus testudineus 1-2

Scientific classification
- Kingdom: Animalia
- Phylum: Arthropoda
- Subphylum: Chelicerata
- Order: †Eurypterida
- Family: †Dolichopteridae
- Genus: †Clarkeipterus; Kjellesvig-Waering 1966

Species
- ?C. otisius (Clarke, 1907); C. testudineus (Clarke & Ruedeman, 1912)

= Clarkeipterus =

Clarkeipterus Temporal range: Silurian

Extinct genus of arthropods

Clarkeipterus is a genus of prehistoric eurypterid classified as part of the family Dolichopteridae. The genus contains two species, C. otisius and C. testudineus, both from the Silurian Bertie Formation of the United States.

== See also ==
- List of eurypterids
