= Stylonuroides =

Stylonuroides Temporal range: Ludlow

Scientific classification
- Kingdom: Animalia
- Phylum: Arthropoda
- Subphylum: Chelicerata
- Order: †Eurypterida
- Family: †Rhenopteridae
- Genus: †Stylonuroides; Kjellesvig-Waering, 1966
- Species: †S. dolichopteroides

Binomial name
- †Stylonuroides dolichopteroides (Størmer, 1934)

Extinct genus of arthropods

Stylonuroides is a genus of prehistoric eurypterid. The genus contains a single species, S. dolichopteroides from the Silurian of Ringerike, Norway.

Stylonuroides has been classified as a stylonurine since its description, but more precise classification has proven difficult historically. The genus was long classified as incertae sedis within the suborder. A comprehensive phylogenetic analysis by Lamsdell (2025) recovered Stylonuroides within the Rhenopteridae, as the sister taxon of Rhenopterus.

== Description ==
The prosomal carapace (head) of Stylonuroides was parabolic in shape, and its eyes were placed roughly in the middle of the carapace. The plates of the prosoma and the fourth to sixth appendages were similar to Brachyopterella. Much of the rest of the body, including the other appendages, the metastoma, and the telson, is unknown due to poor fossil material.

== Species ==
Stylonuroides contains one valid species, with other named species now seen as invalid.

- Stylonuroides dolichopteroides Størmer, 1934 - Ringerike, Norway (Silurian)

Invalid or reassigned species are listed below:

- Stylonuroides limbatus Clarke & Rudemann, 1912 - New York, United States (Ordovician), a pseudofossil.
- Stylonuroides orientalis Shpinev, 2012 - Siberia, Russia (Devonian), nomen dubium, potentially non-diagnostic. May be a juvenile specimen of Parahughmilleria longa.
