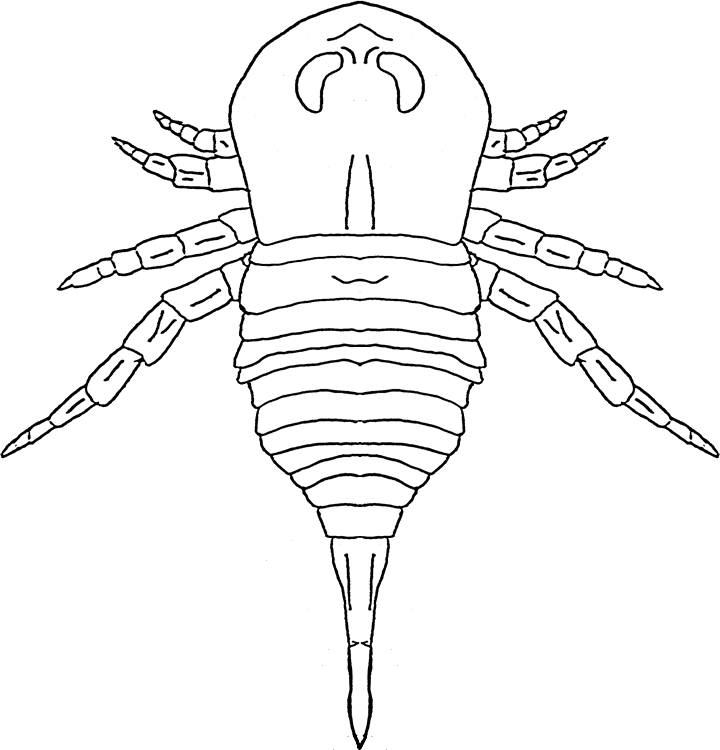
- Reconstruction of Brachyopterus stubblefieldi

Scientific classification
- Kingdom: Animalia
- Phylum: Arthropoda
- Subphylum: Chelicerata
- Order: †Eurypterida
- Superfamily: †Rhenopteroidea
- Family: †Brachyopteridae; Lamsdell, 2025
- Genus: †Brachyopterus; Størmer, 1951

Type species
- †Brachyopterus stubblefieldi Størmer, 1951

= Brachyopterus =

Brachyopterus Temporal range: Middle Ordovician, 460 Ma

Extinct genus of sea scorpions

Brachyopterus was one of the earliest known eurypterid genera, having been recovered from Middle Ordovician deposits in Montgomeryshire, Wales. Though other species have been assigned to it in the past, Brachyopterus is today recognized as containing one valid species, B. stubblefieldi.

== Description ==
Size comparison of B. stubblefieldi with a human hand.

Brachyopterus is distinguished by its small size, compound eyes with axes converging anteriorly on a subtrapezoid to subpentagonal prosoma (head). All of its legs are walking legs; the first three pairs are short with spines, except when modified into clasping organs; the last two pairs are moderately long, keeled and tapering in width to terminal claws. The last leg falls short of the penultimate abdominal segment. The abdomen is narrow and ends in a short styliform telson. Brachyopterus date from the Middle Ordovician.

== Classification ==
Kjellesvig-Waering (1966) concluded that "there is no other genus that warrants comparison, or, indeed at our present state of knowledge, reveals any close affinities with this very unusual genus", though the genus was able to be classified as a stylonurine. In later years, further similarities have been noted between Brachyopterus and the rhenopterids. Lamsdell et al. (2010) classified it as the most basal of the rhenopterids and a sister taxon to more derived rhenopterids (such as Kiaeropterus and Rhenopterus). In 2025, Lamsdell classified Brachyopterus in its own family in the Rhenopteroidea, Brachyopteridae.

== See also ==
- List of eurypterids
