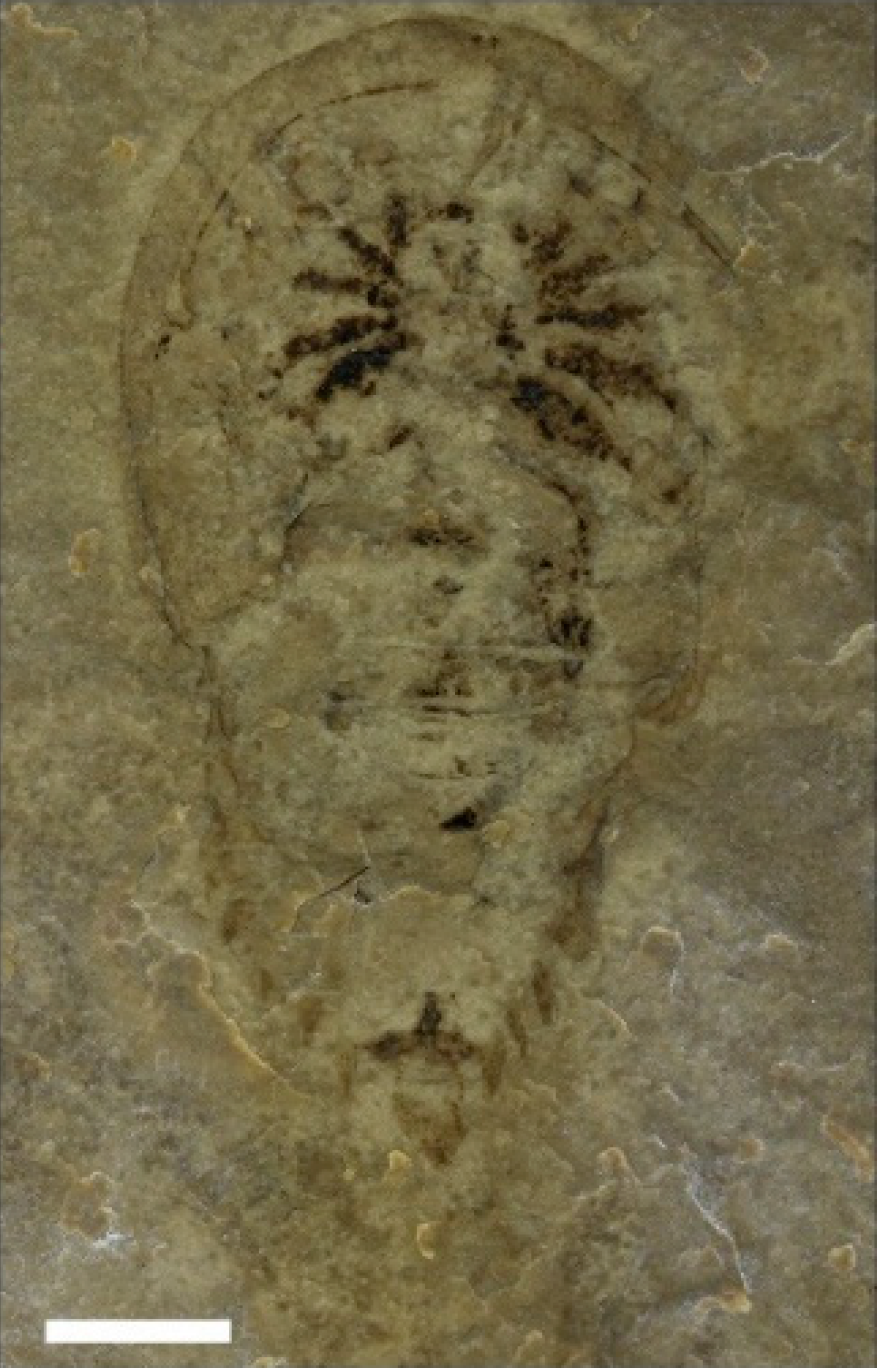
- Fossil of Bunaia woodwardi

Scientific classification
- Kingdom: Animalia
- Phylum: Arthropoda
- Subphylum: Chelicerata
- Family: †Offacolidae
- Genus: †Bunaia; Clarke, 1919

Type species
- †Bunaia woodwardi Clarke, 1919

Species
- †"B". heintzi Størmer, 1934; †B. woodwardi Clarke, 1919

= Bunaia =

Bunaia Temporal range: Silurian

Extinct genus of chelicerate

Bunaia is a genus of Silurian chelicerate arthropod. The genus contains at least one species: Bunaia woodwardi from the Silurian period in Svalbard, Norway and the Bertie Group of Ontario.

== Description ==
Initially, the type species was known only from poorly preserved specimens composed of semicircular prosomal (head) carapace, fragments of opisthosoma (trunk) and disarticulated telson (tail). The prosoma lacking compound eyes, but it might possess median sensory organs on the ventral side.

Lustri et al. (2024) described additional specimens, which revealed its opisthosoma and ventral appendages that indicating its offacolid affinity. The prosoma possess a pair of elongated chelicerae (pincer-like mouthparts) followed by five pairs of legs. At least the first four pairs of legs are biramous (two-branched), bearing well developed exopod (upper branch) at the top of each endopod (leg-like inner branch). Further details of the prosomal appendages are obscured. The opisthosoma has 11 somites (body segments) covered by tergites (dorsal exoskeleton), with the seventh to tenth tergite possess triangular pleural (lateral) spines. The first opisthosomal somite bearing a pair of paddle-like uniramous (unbranched) exopods. There are traces of other opisthosomal appendages up to the seventh opisthosomal somite but mostly unpreserved. underneath its posterior somites there is a ventral pretelsonic process.

It is relatively large as an offacolid, measuring up to 32 mm in body length (excluding telson).

== Taxonomy ==
Bunaia is a synziphosurine, a paraphyletic group of fossil chelicerate arthropods. After the revision done in 2013, Bunaia was tentatively placed as part of the clade Planaterga, However the aforementioned 2024 study found it to be within Offacolidae, a basal group of euchelicerates.

The placement of "Bunaia" heintzi (known only by a single carapace from the Silurian period in the United States) within this genus has been questioned.
