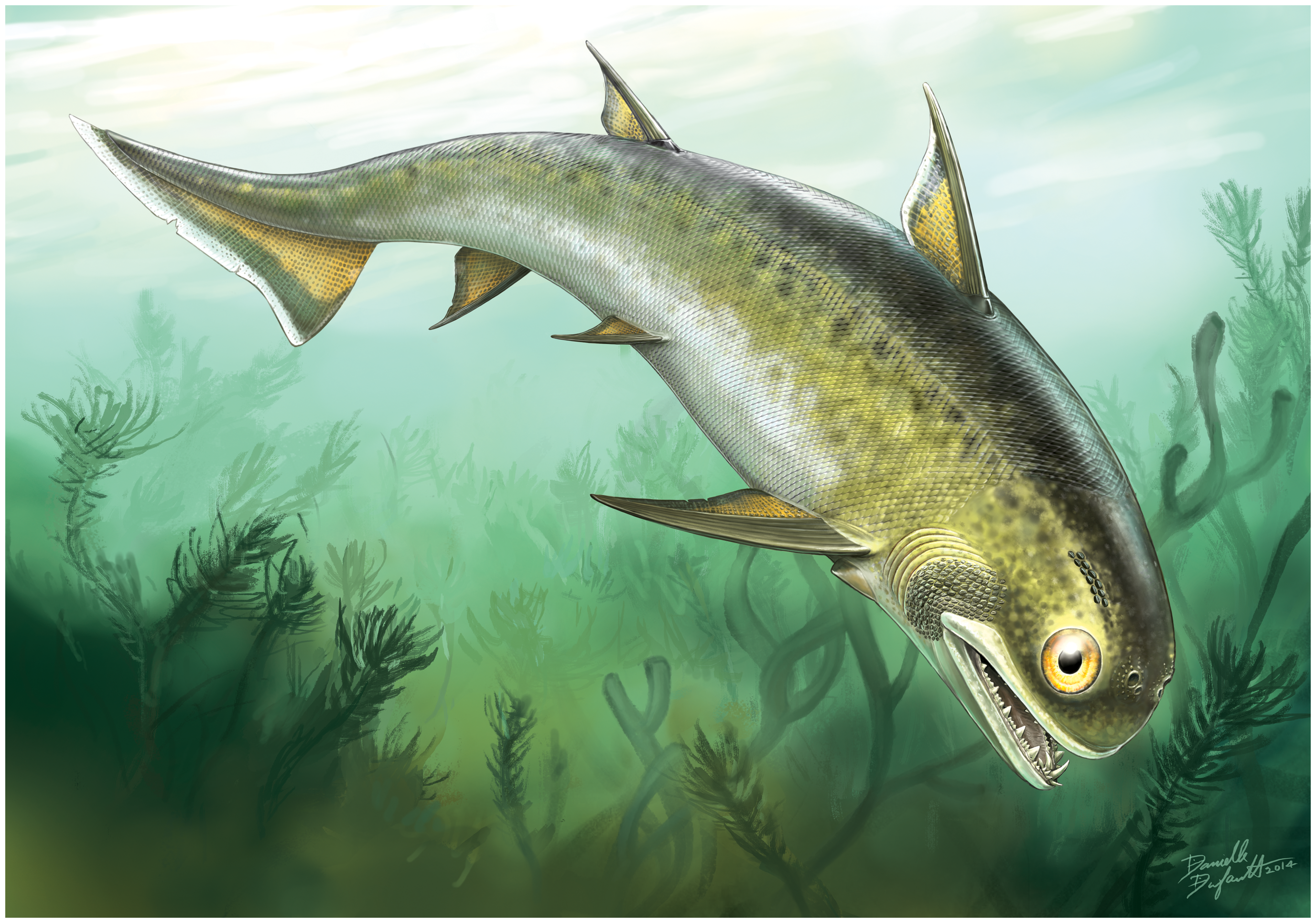
- Illustration

Scientific classification
- Kingdom: Animalia
- Phylum: Chordata
- Class: Chondrichthyes
- Subclass: †Acanthodii
- Order: †Ischnacanthiformes
- Family: †Acritolepidae
- Genus: †Nerepisacanthus; Carole J. Burrow, 2011
- Species: †N. denisoni

Binomial name
- †Nerepisacanthus denisoni Carole J. Burrow, 2011

= Nerepisacanthus =

Nerepisacanthus Temporal range: Telychian–Ludlow

Extinct genus of cartilaginous fishes

Nerepisacanthus is an extinct genus of acanthodian, probably acritolepid, from Middle Silurian (?late Llandovery (Telychian) to Ludlow stages) deposits of New Brunswick, Canada. Nerepisacanthus is known from many incomplete but articulated specimens. It was collected from the Cunningham Creek Formation, near Nerepis, southern New Brunswick. It was first named by Carole J. Burrow in 2011 and the type species is Nerepisacanthus denisoni. Additional specimen is known from Bertie Formation, making that species the oldest near-complete acanthodian. This specimen is 11.2 cm in length.
