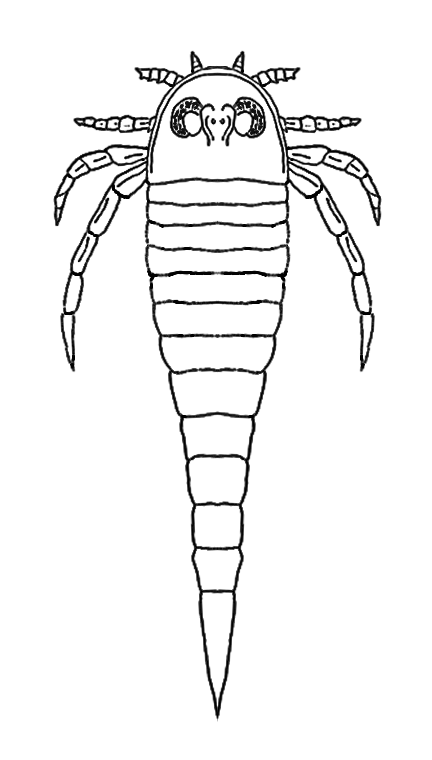
- Reconstruction of K. cyclophthalmus with prosomal appendages and telson based on close relative Brachyopterus.

Scientific classification
- Kingdom: Animalia
- Phylum: Arthropoda
- Subphylum: Chelicerata
- Order: †Eurypterida
- Family: †Brachyopterellidae
- Genus: †Kiaeropterus; Waterston, 1979

Species
- K. cyclophthalmus Laurie, 1892; K. ruedemanni Størmer, 1934 (type species)

Synonyms
- Eurypterus cyclophthalmus Laurie, 1892

= Kiaeropterus =

Kiaeropterus Temporal range: Silurian, 428.2–422.9 Ma

Extinct genus of arthropods

Kiaeropterus is a genus of prehistoric eurypterid classified as part of the Brachyopterellidae family. Two species, both from the Silurian period, are known; K. cyclophthalmus from Scotland and K. ruedemanni from Norway.

== Description ==
Kiaeropterus was a small eurypterid, with K. cyclophthalmus reaching lengths of about 6,6 cm. It had a subquadrate carapace with broad marginal rims. The eyes were large, covering about a third of the length of the carapace. The metasoma was narrow and the mesosoma not wider than the carapace, unlike in some eurypterids. The appendages V and VI were non-spiniferous and simple with individual podomeres having pronounced ridges.

The genus is very poorly known. The type species K. ruedemanni is known only from two specimens, PMO HI733 and HI711. Two additional specimens may be referrable to the species, PMO HI661 and HI678, though they are seemingly missing. K. cyclophthalmus, differentiated by its wider carapace and slightly larger and more circular palpebral lobes along with its larger ocelli, is known only from one almost complete specimen, NMS G.1885.26.72P, that lacks most of the prosomal appendages and the telson.

== History of discovery ==
Kiaeropterus cyclophthalmus was originally described as Eurypterus cyclophthalmus based on a single specimen from the Lower Silurian of the Pentland Hills near Edinburgh in Scotland. This specimen was purchased as part of a larger collection of fossil specimens by the Edinburgh Museum of Science and Art in 1885. When it was described in 1892, eurypterid taxonomy had not been firmly established or thoroughly researched and as a result, most new specimens were classified as part of the genus Eurypterus.

When re-studied, the specimen was found to share considerably more features with the Stylonurina than with Eurypterus (which is classified as part of the Eurypterina), for instance its large eyes. Further comparisons with what limited material was known of K. ruedemanni allowed it to be placed into the genus Kiaeropterus.

== Classification ==
The exact phylogenetic position of Kiareopterus is uncertain. It was originally classified as a stylonurid by Waterston (1979). Later studies revealed important similarities with Brachyopterus, including the large eyes converging anteriorly, the lack of a cuticular ornament and simple rectangular appendage podomeres with pronounced ridges. These similarities prompted it to be classified as a close relative of Brachyopterus, within the family Rhenopteridae. In 2025, Lamsdell classified Kiaeropterus in the family Brachyopterellidae.

== See also ==
- List of eurypterids
