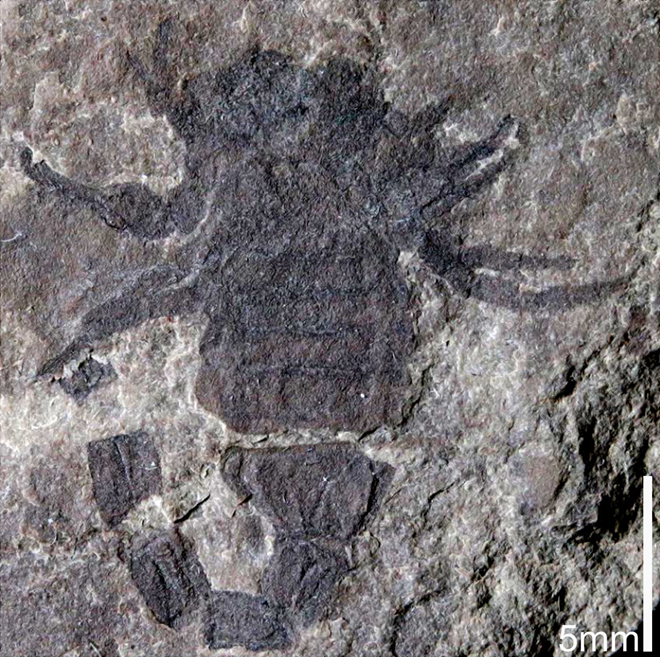
- Fossil specimen YPM IP 545850
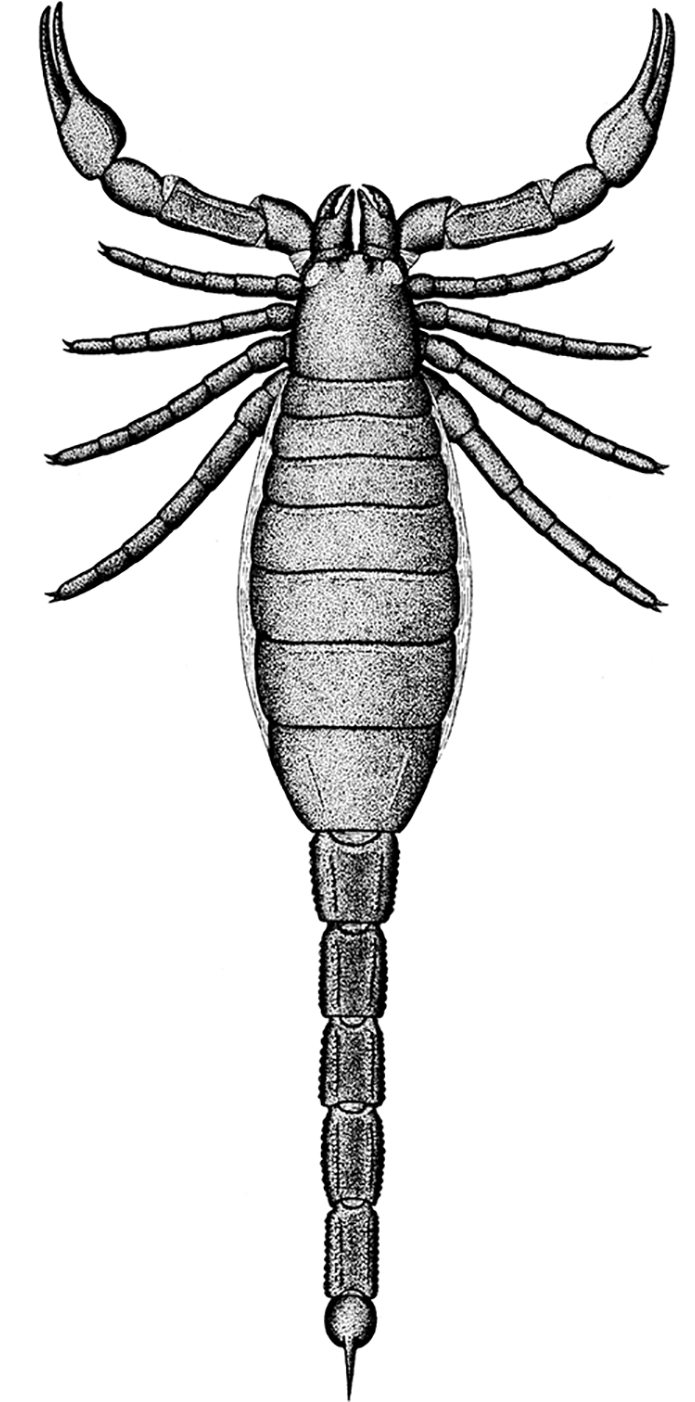
- Life restoration

Scientific classification
- Domain: Eukaryota
- Kingdom: Animalia
- Phylum: Arthropoda
- Subphylum: Chelicerata
- Class: Arachnida
- Order: Scorpiones
- Family: †Proscorpiidae
- Genus: †Proscorpius; Whitfield, 1885

Type species
- †Proscorpius osborni (Whitfield, 1885)

Synonyms
- Archaeophonus eurypteroides Kjellesvig-Waering, 1966; Stoermeroscorpio delicatus Kjellesvig-Waering, 1966

= Proscorpius =

Proscorpius Temporal range: Wenlock-Lochkovian, 422.9–416.0 Ma

Extinct genus of scorpions

Proscorpius (meaning 'dawn scorpion') is an extinct genus of proscorpiid scorpion that was originally thought to have been a eurypterid. Proscorpius lived during the Silurian and Devonian periods (about 422.9–416.0 ma). The type and only species, Proscorpius osborni is an example of one of the earliest scorpions. It was discovered in the Lagerstätte Bertie Formation (Fiddlers Green Member); an epifaunal stratum of New York. The fossil measures roughly 3.8 cm (1.5 inches) in length, however, it is missing part of the tail, so in life the animal would be slightly longer.

== See also ==
- Gondwanascorpio
