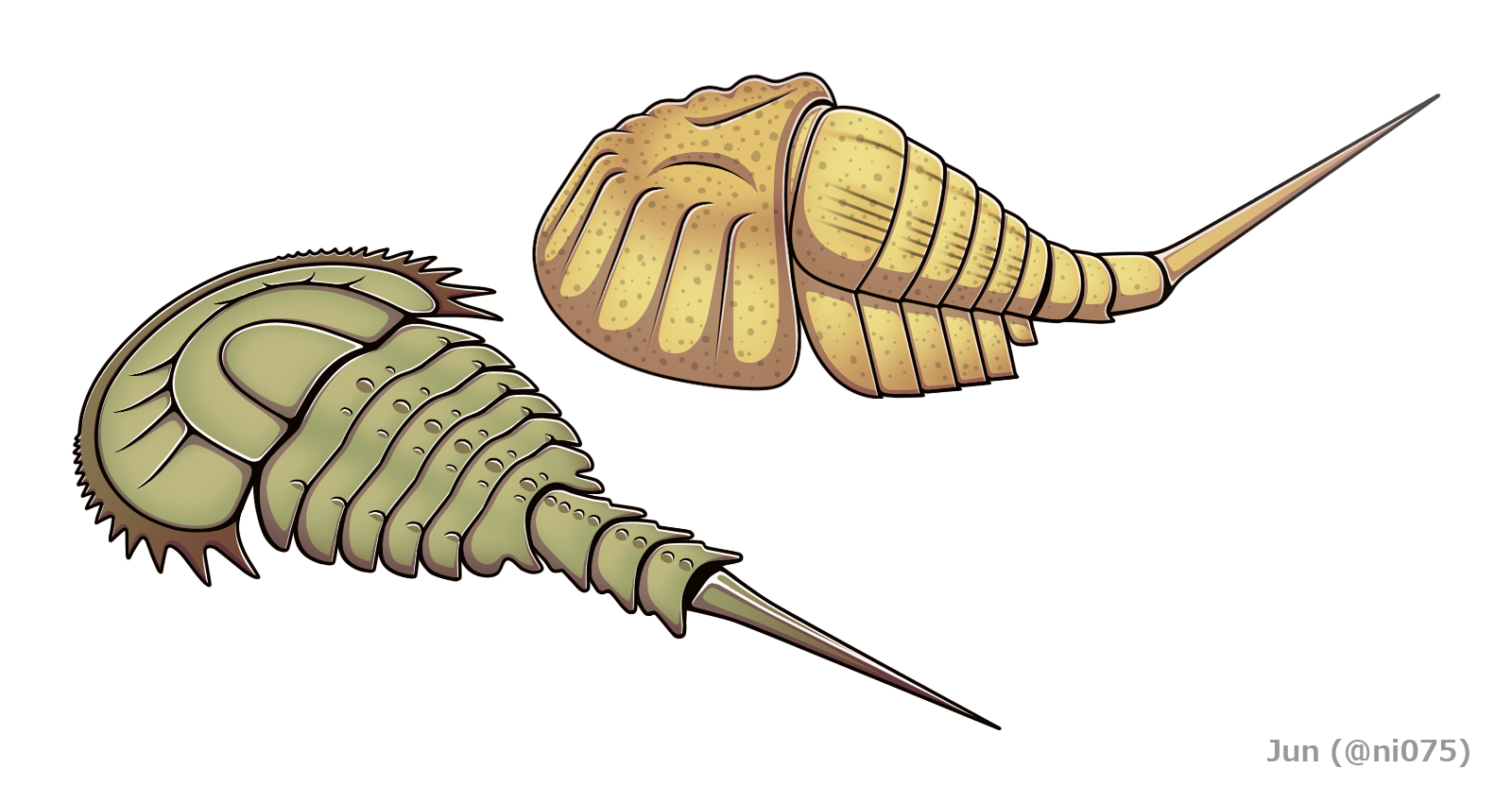
- Restoration of Limuloides limuloides and Bunodes lunula

Scientific classification
- Kingdom: Animalia
- Phylum: Arthropoda
- Subphylum: Chelicerata
- Clade: Prosomapoda
- Clade: Planaterga
- Family: †Bunodidae; Packard, 1886

Type species
- †Bunodes lunula Eichwald, 1854

Genera
- †Bunodes; †Limuloides

Synonyms
- Limuloididae Størmer, 1952

= Bunodidae =

Bunodidae Temporal range: Silurian

Extinct family of chelicerates

Bunodidae is an extinct family of synziphosurine chelicerates that lived in the Silurian. Bunodidae is classified inside the clade Planaterga alongside Pseudoniscidae and Dekatriata (chasmataspidids, eurypterids and arachnids). Bunodidae is composed by two genera, Bunodes (the type genus) and Limuloides.
