= Hercynella =

Scientific classification
- Kingdom: Animalia
- Phylum: Mollusca
- Class: Bivalvia
- Subclass: Pteriomorphia
- Clade: Ostreomorphi
- Clade: Arcioni
- Order: †Cyrtodontida
- Suborder: †Praecardiidina
- Clade: †Antipleuroidei
- Superfamily: †Antipleuroidea
- Family: †Antipleuridae
- Genus: †Hercynella; Kayser, 1878

Species
- †Hercynella bohemicum; †Hercynella killarensis Gill, 1950; †Hercynella petasoida Gill, 1950; †Hercynella victoriae Chapman, 1916

Genus of bivalves

Hercynella is a genus of fossil bivalves of late Silurian or (more commonly) Early Devonian age, found in Europe, North America, western Asia, North Africa and Australia. The name was also invalidly applied to a genus of moths now known as Tulaya.

Species were originally thought to be patellid gastropods and it was not until 1950 that H. & G. Termier realised that they were bivalves. Prantl (1959) showed that both left and right valves could occur in two forms, which had in the past led to palaeontologists erecting two species where there was only one.

The best review of the genus is Forney et al. (1981).
