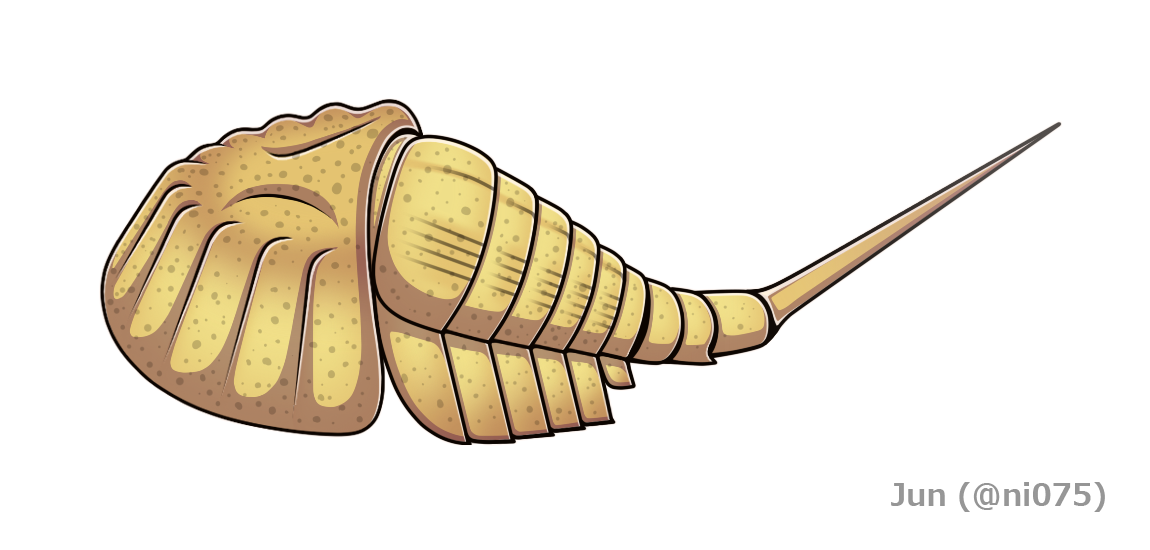
- Restoration of B. lunula

Scientific classification
- Kingdom: Animalia
- Phylum: Arthropoda
- Subphylum: Chelicerata
- Clade: Prosomapoda
- Clade: Planaterga
- Family: †Bunodidae
- Genus: †Bunodes; Eichwald, 1854

Type species
- †Bunodes lunula Eichwald, 1854

Synonyms
- Exapinurus Nieszkowski, 1859

= Bunodes =

Bunodes Temporal range: Silurian

Genus of horseshoe crab relatives

Bunodes is a genus of synziphosurine, a paraphyletic group of fossil chelicerate arthropods. Bunodes was regarded as part of the clade Planaterga. Fossils of the single and type species, B. lunula, have been discovered in deposits of the Silurian period in Ludlow, England (in the United Kingdom). Bunodes is the type genus of the family Bunodidae, the other genera of the same family being Limuloides.

Bunodes is characterized by a vaulted carapace with radiated hump-like ridges. Within the 10-segmented opisthosoma, the first opisthosomal tergite is greatly reduced and always covered by the posterior region of preceding carapace, while the second tergite is significantly well-developed. the last 3 opisthosomal segments specialized into a narrow postabdomen and lacking tergopleurae (lateral extension of tergites). Tubercles of various sizes covering most of the dorsal surface of both carapace and tergites. Similar to Limuloides, Bunodes was once thought to have lateral eyes on the second pair of radiated ridges of its carapace, but later investigation did not find any evidence of it.
