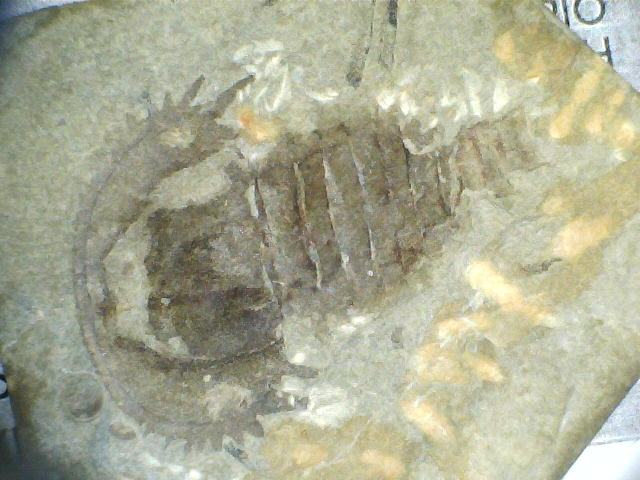
- Specimen In 60018 of the species L. limuloides, located in the Natural History Museum in London
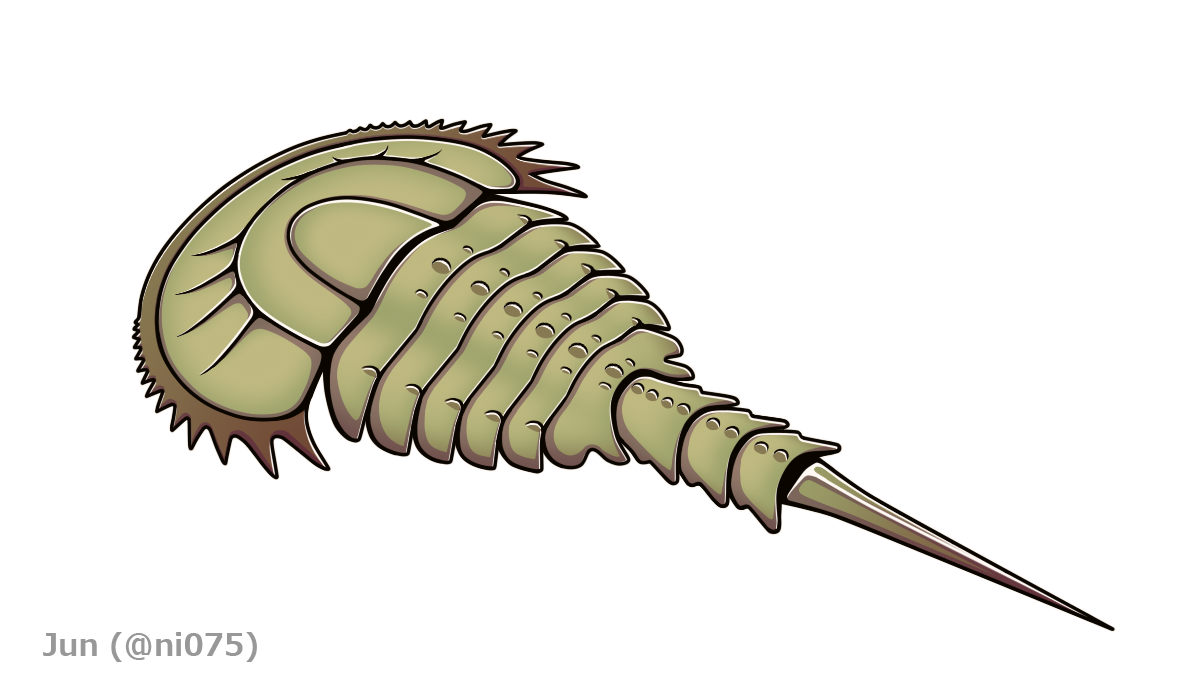
- Reconstruction

Scientific classification
- Kingdom: Animalia
- Phylum: Arthropoda
- Subphylum: Chelicerata
- Clade: Prosomapoda
- Clade: Planaterga
- Family: †Bunodidae
- Genus: †Limuloides; Woodward, 1865

Type species
- †Limuloides limuloides Woodward, 1865

Species
- †?L. eriensis Clarke, 1924; †L. limuloides Woodward, 1865; †L. horridus Woodward, 1872; †L. salweyi Woodward, 1872; †L. speratus Woodward, 1872

Synonyms
- Hemiaspis Woodward, 1865 (preoccupied)

= Limuloides =

Limuloides Temporal range: Silurian

Genus of horseshoe crab relatives

Limuloides is a genus of synziphosurine, a paraphyletic group of fossil chelicerate arthropods. Limuloides was regarded as part of the clade Planaterga. Fossils of the genus have been discovered in deposits of the Silurian period in the United Kingdom and potentially in the United States. Limuloides is one of the two genera of the family Bunodidae, the other being the type genus Bunodes. Limuloides is characterized by a carapace with radiated ridges and serrated lateral regions, and an opisthosoma with rows of nodes. Limuloides was once thought to have lateral compound eyes on its carapace, but later investigation did not find any evidence of it.
