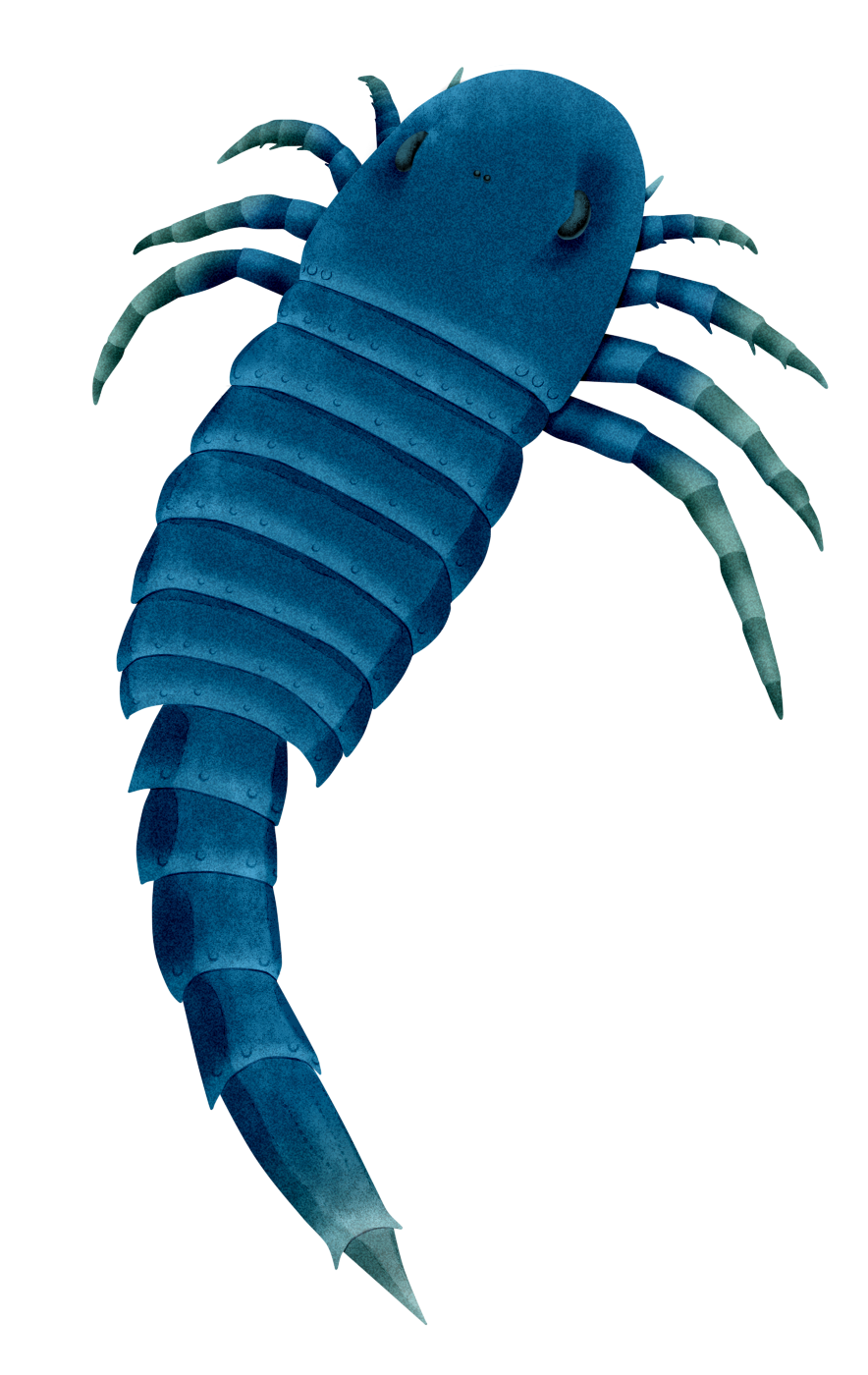
- Reconstruction of Rhenopterus diensti

Scientific classification
- Kingdom: Animalia
- Phylum: Arthropoda
- Subphylum: Chelicerata
- Order: †Eurypterida
- Superfamily: †Rhenopteroidea
- Family: †Rhenopteridae
- Genus: †Rhenopterus; Størmer, 1936

Type species
- Rhenopterus diensti Størmer, 1936

Other species
- R. macrotuberculatus Størmer, 1974; R. tuberculatus Størmer, 1936

= Rhenopterus =

Rhenopterus Temporal range: Lower Devonian, 409.1–402.5 Ma

Extinct genus of Devonian organisms

Rhenopterus is an extinct prehistoric eurypterid. Fossils of Rhenopterus have been recovered from deposits of Lower Devonian age in Germany.

== Description ==
Rhenopterids were small, characterized by scattered tubercules and knobs on the outer surface of the exoskeleton. Their first two (or possibly three) pairs of walking legs had spines; the last two pairs were long and powerful, without spines. The prosoma (head) was subtrapezoidal, with arcuate compound eyes on parallel axes. The male genital appendages were short with two distal spines.

== Species ==
Rhenopterus contains three valid species, with other named species now seen as invalid or part of other genera.

- Rhenopterus diensti Størmer, 1936 - Germany (Lower Devonian)
- Rhenopterus macrotuberculatus Størmer, 1974 - Alken an der Mosel, Germany (Devonian)
- Rhenopterus tuberculatus Størmer, 1936 - Germany (Devonian)

Invalid or reassigned species are listed below:

- "Rhenopterus" latus Størmer, 1936 - Germany (Devonian), synonym of R. diensti.
- "Rhenopterus" sievertsi Størmer, 1969 - Germany (Devonian), reclassified as a species of Adelophthalmus.

== See also ==
- List of eurypterids
