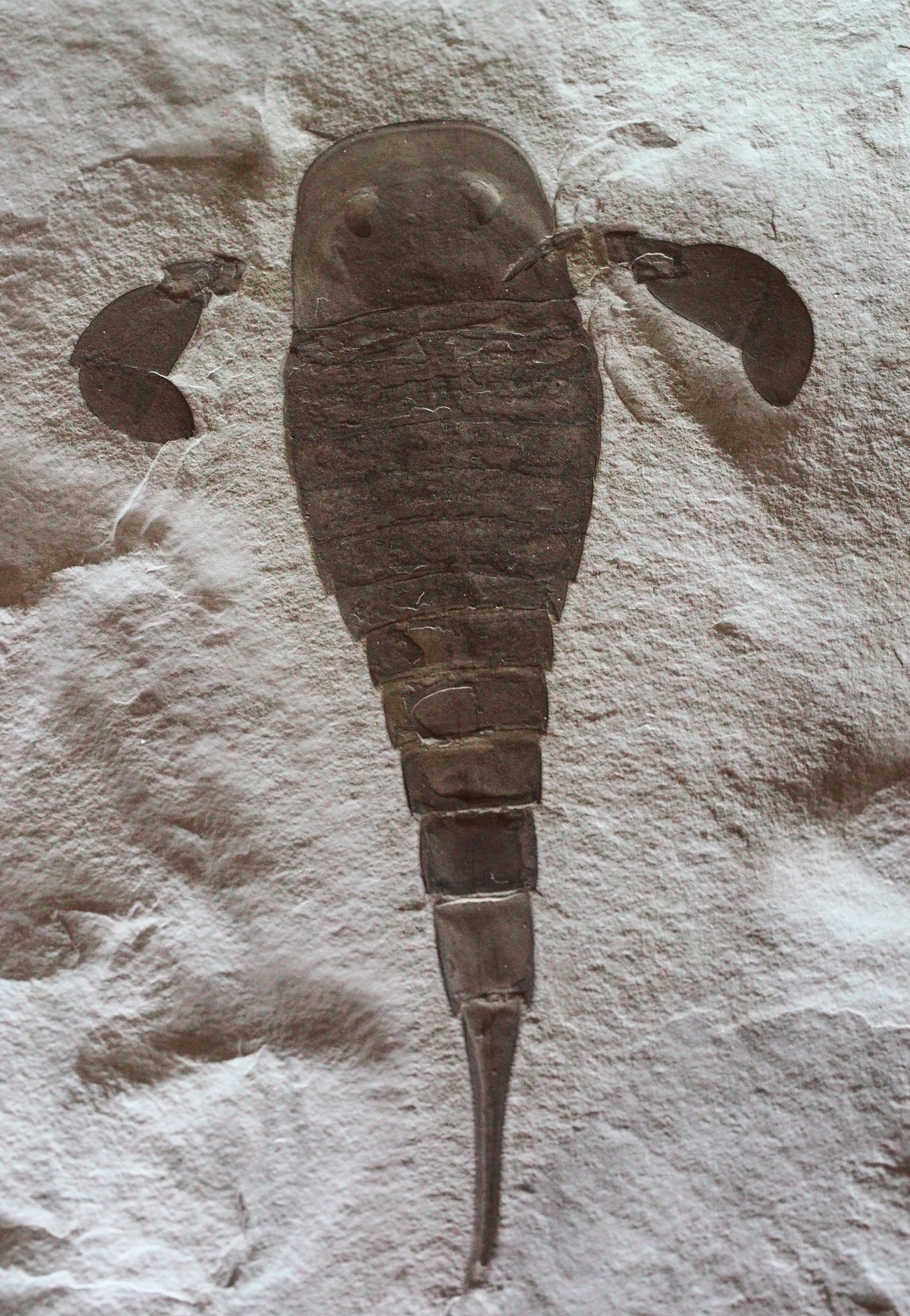
- Fossil of the type species E. remipes seen from above, Museo Geominero

Scientific classification
- Kingdom: Animalia
- Phylum: Arthropoda
- Subphylum: Chelicerata
- Order: †Eurypterida
- Suborder: †Eurypterina
- Superfamily: †Eurypteroidea; Burmeister, 1843
- Family: †Eurypteridae; Burmeister, 1843
- Genus: †Eurypterus; De Kay, 1825

Type species
- Eurypterus remipes De Kay, 1825

Species
- See text

Synonyms
- Baltoeurypterus Størmer, 1973

= Eurypterus =

Eurypterus Temporal range: Silurian, 432–418.1 Ma

Extinct genus of sea scorpions

Eurypterus (/jʊəˈrɪptərəs/ yoo-RIP-tər-əs) is an extinct genus of eurypterid, a group of organisms commonly called "sea scorpions". The genus lived during the Silurian period, from around 432 to 418 million years ago. Eurypterus is by far the most well-studied and well-known eurypterid. Eurypterus fossil specimens probably represent more than 95% of all known eurypterid specimens.

There are fifteen species belonging to the genus Eurypterus, the most common of which is E. remipes, the first eurypterid fossil discovered and the state fossil of New York.

Members of Eurypterus averaged at about 13 to 23 cm (5 to 9 in) in length, but the largest individual discovered was estimated to be 60 cm (24 in) long. They all possessed spine-bearing appendages and a large paddle they used for swimming. They were generalist species, equally likely to engage in predation or scavenging.

== Discovery ==
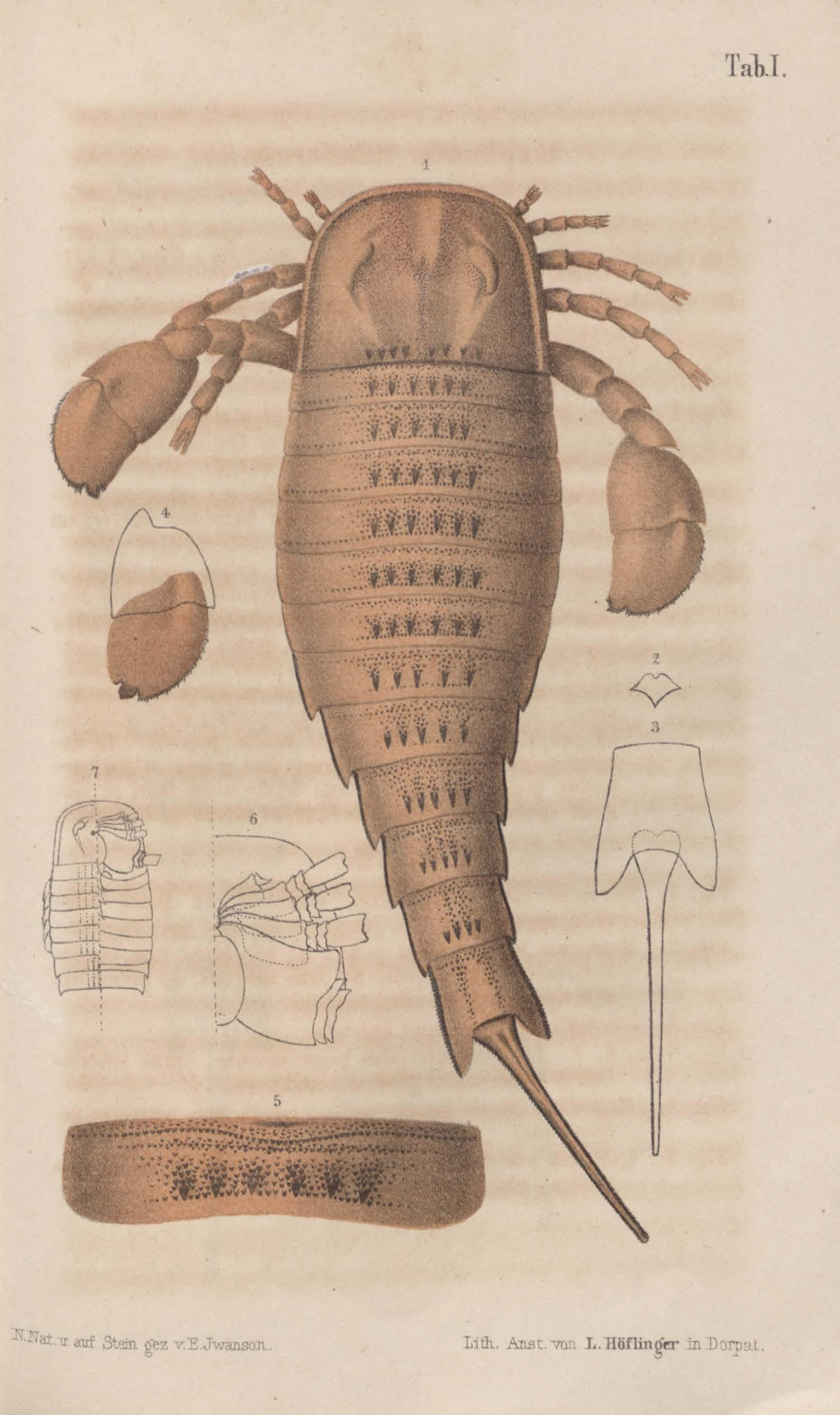
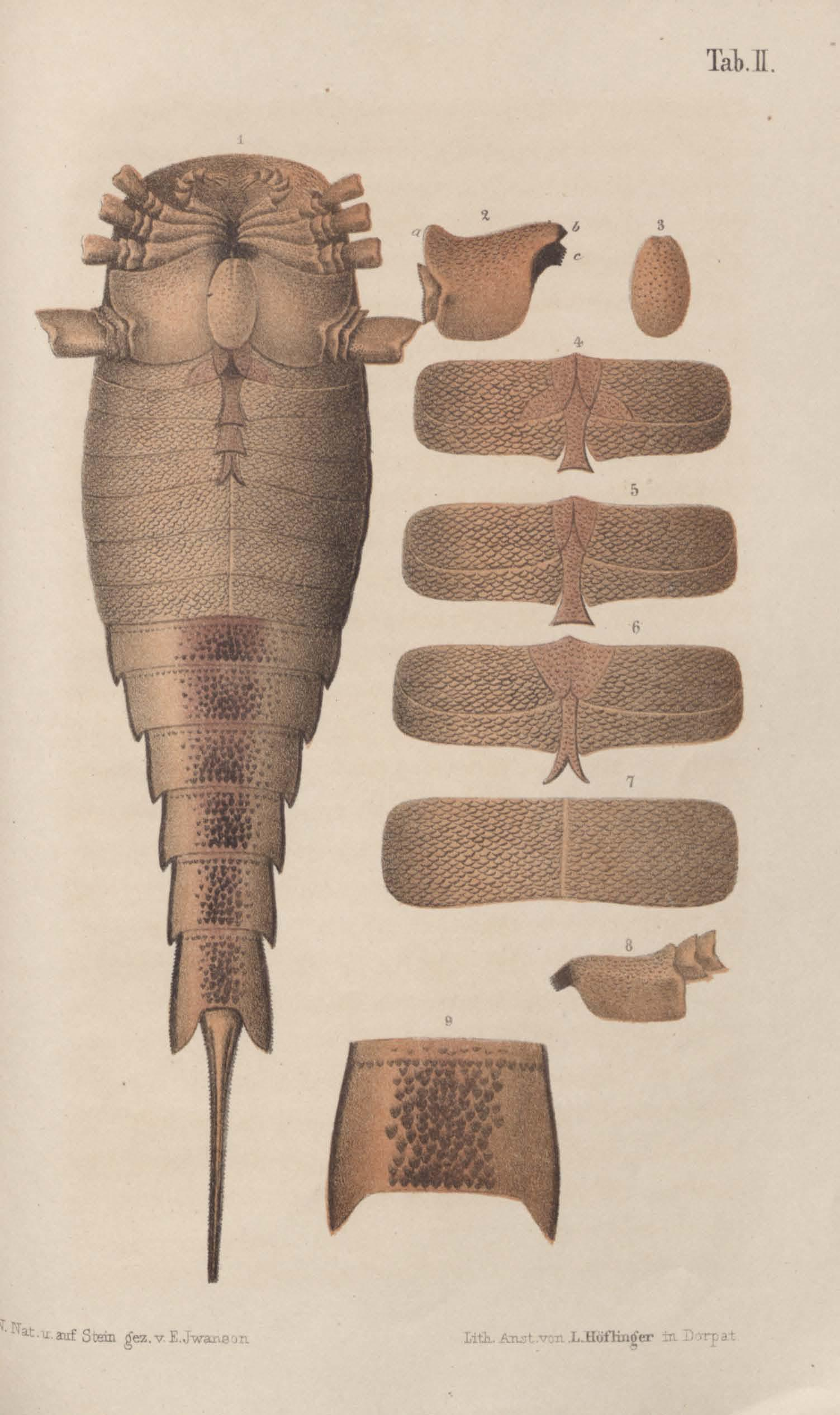
Dorsal and ventral aspects of Eurypterus tetragonophthalmus, from Jan Nieszkowski's 1858 dissertation

The first fossil of Eurypterus was found in 1818 by S. L. Mitchill, a fossil collector. It was recovered from the Bertie Formation of New York (near Westmoreland, Oneida County). Mitchill interpreted the appendages on the carapace as barbels arising from the mouth. He consequently identified the fossil as a catfish of the genus Silurus.

It was only after seven years, in 1825, that the American zoologist James Ellsworth De Kay identified the fossil correctly as an arthropod. He named it Eurypterus remipes and established the genus Eurypterus in the process. The genus name comes from Ancient Greek εὐρύς (eurús), meaning "wide", and πτερόν (pterón), meaning "wing", referring to their paddle-shaped legs.

However, De Kay thought Eurypterus was a branchiopod (a group of crustaceans which include fairy shrimps and water fleas). Soon after, Eurypterus lacustris was also discovered in New York in 1835 by the paleontologist Richard Harlan. Another species was discovered in Estonia in 1858 by Jan Nieszkowski. He considered it to be of the same species as the first discovery (E. remipes); it is now known as E. tetragonophthalmus. These specimens from Estonia are often of extraordinary quality, retaining the actual cuticle of their exoskeletons. In 1898, the Swedish paleontologist Gerhard Holm separated these fossils from the bedrock with acids. Holm was then able to examine the almost perfectly preserved fragments under a microscope. His remarkable study led to the modern breakthrough on eurypterid morphology.

More fossils were recovered in great abundance in New York in the 19th century, and elsewhere in eastern Eurasia and North America. Today, Eurypterus remains one of the most commonly found and best known eurypterid genera, comprising more than 95% of all known eurypterid fossils.

E. remipes was designated the New York State Fossil by the then Governor Mario Cuomo in 1984.

== Description ==
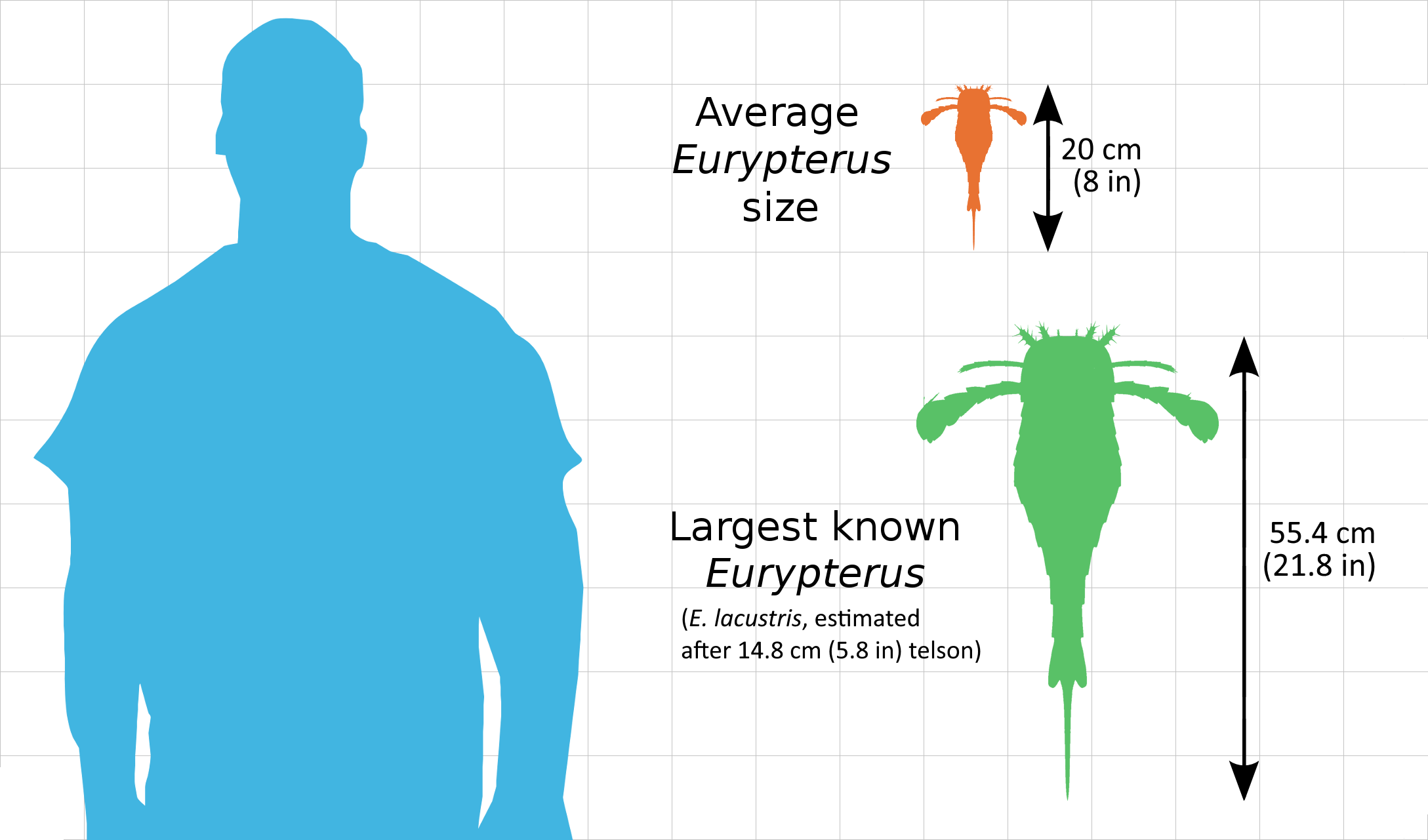
Comparison of an average adult human male (170 cm (5.6 ft)) with the average E. remipes length (around 20 cm (7.9 in)) and the largest known Eurypterus lacustris fossil (55.4 cm (21.8 in)).

The largest arthropods to have ever existed were eurypterids. The largest known species (Jaekelopterus rhenaniae) reached up to 2.5 m (8.2 ft) in length, about the size of a crocodile. Species of Eurypterus, however, were much smaller.

E. remipes are usually between 13 and 20 cm (5 and 8 in) in length. E. lacustris average at larger sizes at 15 to 23 cm (6 to 9 in) in length. However, a single telson (the posteriormost division of the body) of a specimen of this species reaches this length, being 14.8 cm (5.8 in) long and indicating a specimen of 55.4 cm (21.8 in) of length, and that is the largest specimen ever described in literature. In the introduction page of E. remipes in website of University of Texas at Austin says that the largest specimen ever found was 1.3 m (4.3 ft) long, currently on display at the Paleontological Research Institution of New York. However, the text section describes the group eurypterid itself rather than Eurypterus, so it is not possible to determine in context whether the 1.3 m (4.3 ft) long specimen is actually from E. remipes or another eurypterid.

Eurypterus fossils often occur in similar sizes in a given area. This may be a result of the fossils being "sorted" into windrows as they were being deposited in shallow waters by storms and wave action.

The Eurypterus body is broadly divided into two parts: the prosoma and the opisthosoma (in turn divided into the mesosoma and the metasoma).

The prosoma is the forward part of the body, it is actually composed of six segments fused together to form the head and the thorax. It contains the semicircular to subrectangular platelike carapace. On the dorsal side of the latter are two large crescent-shaped compound eyes. They also possessed two smaller light-sensitive simple eyes (the median ocelli) near the center of the carapace on a small elevation (known as the ocellar mound). Underneath the carapace is the mouth and six appendages, usually referred to in Roman numerals I-VI. Each appendage in turn is composed of nine segments (known as podomeres) labeled in Arabic numerals 1–9. The first segments which connect the appendages to the body are known as the coxa (plural coxae).

The first pair (Appendage I) are the chelicerae, small pincer-like arms used for tearing food apart (mastication) during feeding. After the chelicerae are three pairs of short legs (Appendages II, III, and IV). They are spiniferous, with predominantly two spines on each podomere and with the tipmost segment having a single spine. The last two segments are often indistinguishable and give the appearance of a single segment having three spines. They are used both for walking and for food capture. The next pair (Appendage V) is the most leg-like of all appendages, longer than the first three pairs and are mostly spineless except at the tipmost segments. The last pair (Appendage VI) are two broad paddle-like legs used for swimming. The coxae of Appendage VI are broad and flat, resembling an 'ear'.

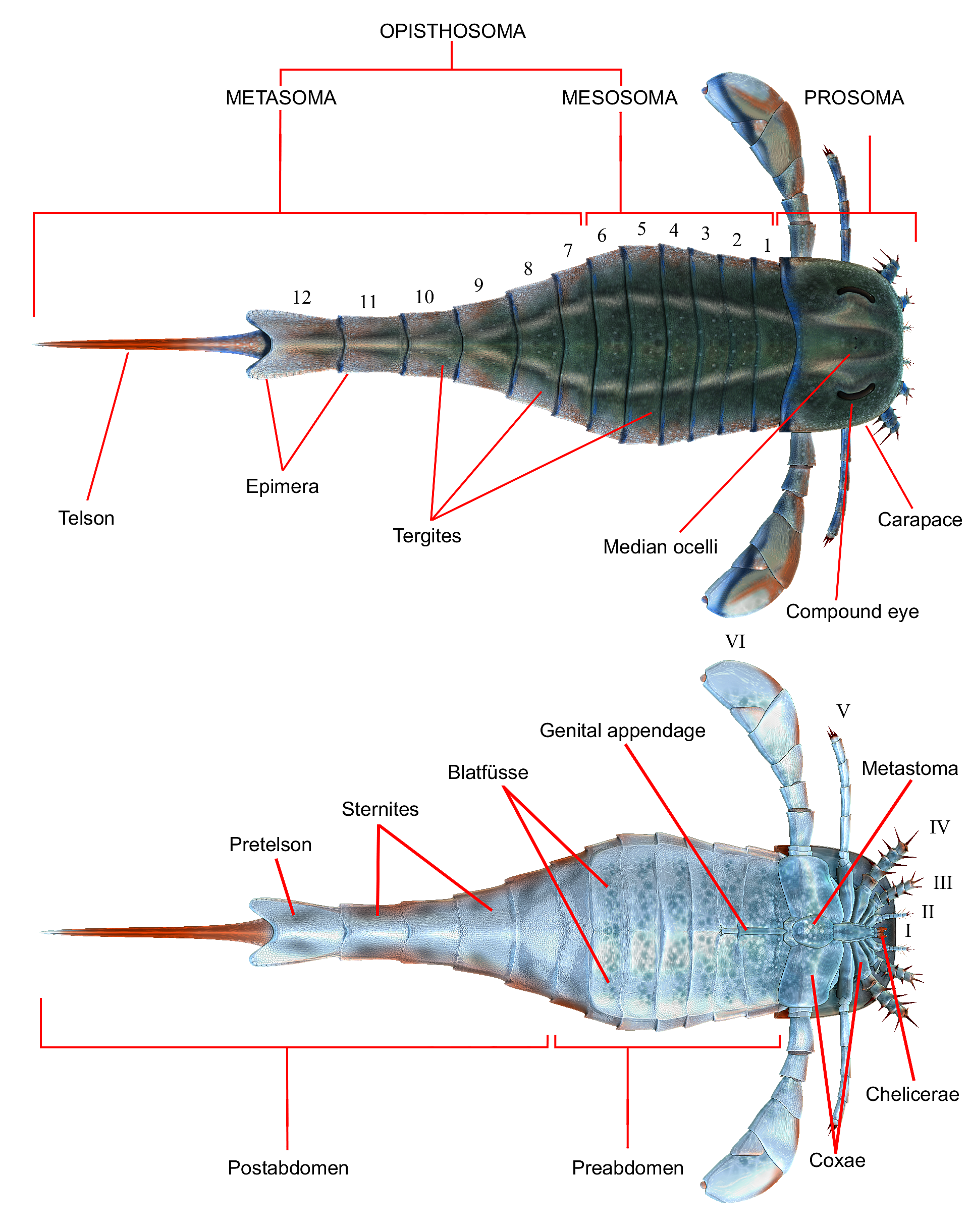
Diagram showing anatomical features

The opisthosoma (the abdomen) is composed of 12 segments, each consisting of a fused upper plate (tergite) and bottom plate (sternite). It is further subdivided in two ways.

Based on the width and structure of each segment, they can be divided into the broad preabdomen (segments 1 to 7) and the narrow postabdomen (segments 8 to 12). The preabdomen is the broader segments of the anterior portion of the opisthosoma while the postabdomen are the last five segments of the Eurypterus body. Each of the segments of the postabdomen contain lateral flattened protrusions known as the epimera with the exception of the last needle-like (styliform) part of the body known as the telson. The segment immediately preceding the telson (which also has the largest epimera of the postabdomen) is known as the pretelson.

An alternative way to divide the opisthosoma is by function. It can also be divided into the mesosoma (segments 1 to 6), and the metasoma (segments 7 to 12). The mesosoma contains the gills and reproductive organs of Eurypterus. Its ventral segments are overlaid by appendage-derived plates known as Blattfüsse (singular Blattfuss, German for "sheet foot"). Protected within which are the branchial chambers which contain the respiratory organs of Eurypterus. The metasoma, meanwhile, do not possess Blattfüsse.

Some authors incorrectly use mesosoma and preabdomen interchangeably, as with metasoma and postabdomen.

The main respiratory organs of Eurypterus were what seems to be book gills, located in branchial chambers within the segments of the mesosoma. They may have been used for underwater respiration. They are composed of several layers of thin tissue stacked in such a way as to resemble the pages of a book, hence the name. In addition, they also possessed five pairs of oval-shaped areas covered with microscopic projections on the ceiling of the second branchial chambers within the mesosoma, immediately below the gill tracts. These areas are known as Kiemenplatten (or gill-tracts, though the former term is preferred). They are unique to eurypterids.

Eurypterus are sexually dimorphic. On the bottom side of the first two segments of the mesosoma are central appendages used for reproduction. In females, they are long and narrow. In the males they are very short. A minority of authors, however, assume the reverse: longer genital appendage for males, shorter for females.

The exoskeleton of Eurypterus is often covered with small outgrowths known as ornamentation. They include pustules (small protrusions), scales, and striations. They vary by species and are used for identification. For more detailed diagnostic descriptions of each species under Eurypterus, see sections below.

== Classification ==
The genus Eurypterus belongs to the family Eurypteridae. They are classified under the superfamily Eurypteroidea, suborder Eurypterina, order Eurypterida, and the subphylum Chelicerata. Eurypterus is the only genus in Eurypteridae, which in turn is the only genus in the superfamily Eurypteroidea. Until recently, eurypterids (e.g. order Eurypterida) were thought to belong to the class Merostomata along with order Xiphosura. It is now believed that eurypterids are a sister group to Arachnida, closer to scorpions and spiders than to horseshoe crabs.

Eurypterus was the first recognized taxon of eurypterids and is the most common. As a consequence, nearly every remotely similar eurypterid in the 19th century was classified under the genus (except for the distinctive members of the family Pterygotidae and Stylonuridae). The genus was eventually split into several genera as the science of taxonomy developed.

In 1958, several species distinguishable by closer placed eyes and spines on their swimming legs were split off into the separate genus Erieopterus by Erik Kjellesvig-Waering. Another split was proposed by Leif Størmer in 1973 when he reclassified some Eurypterus to Baltoeurypterus based on the size of some of the last segments of their swimming legs. O. Erik Tetlie in 2006 deemed these differences too insignificant to justify a separate genus. He merged Baltoeurypterus back into Eurypterus. It is now believed that the minor variations described by Størmer are simply the differences found in adults and juveniles within a species.

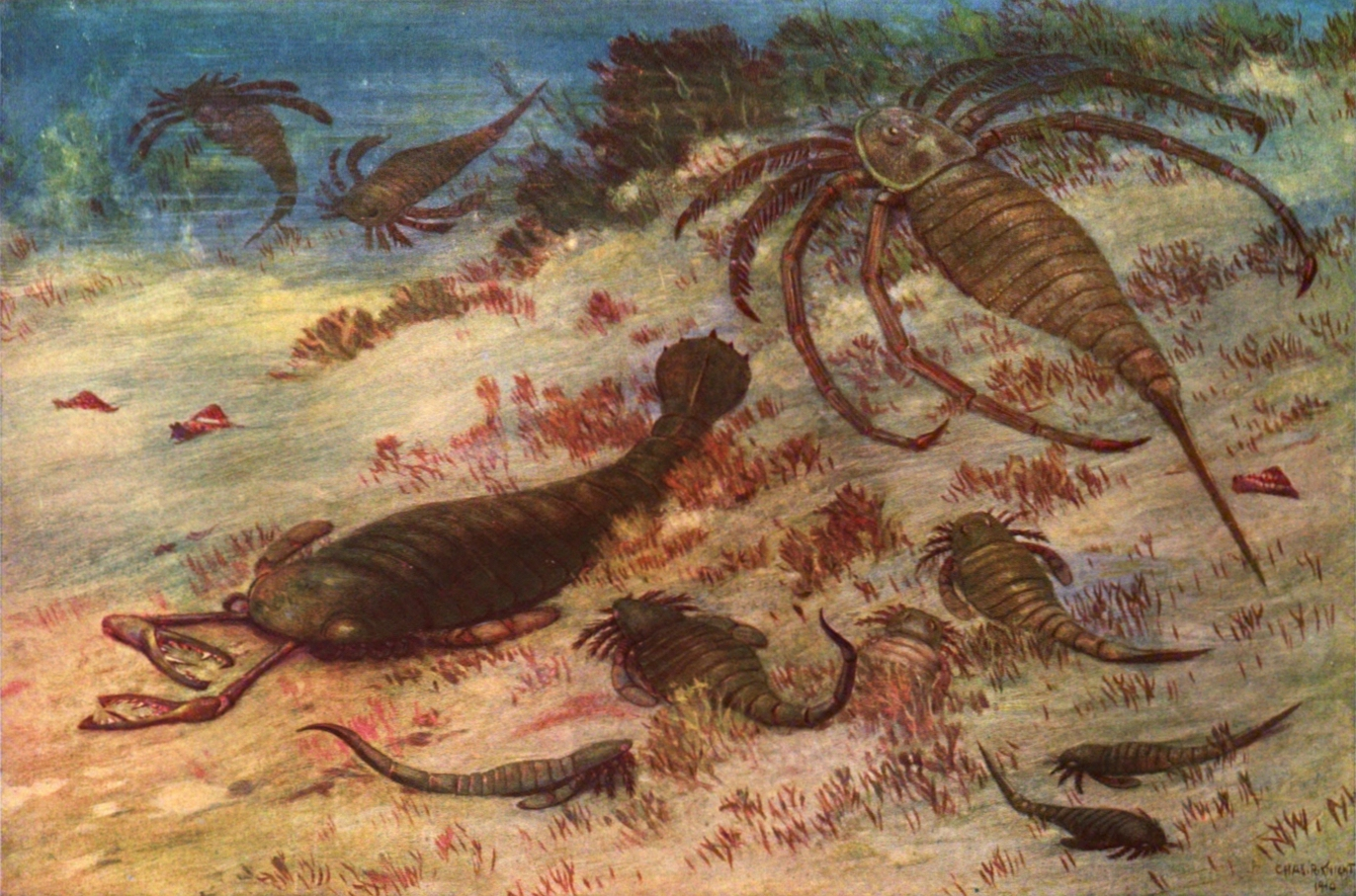
Painting painted in 1912 by Charles R. Knight depicting various eurypterids discovered in New York. The painting includes Dolichopterus, Eusarcana, Stylonurus, Eurypterus and Hughmilleria.

The following is the phylogenetic tree of Eurypterus based on phylogenetic studies by O. Erik Tetlie in 2006. Some species are not represented.

- ←
  - Dolichopteridae
  - - Eurypterus minor
    - - Eurypterus hankeni
      - Eurypterus ornatus
      - Eurypterus dekayi
      - Eurypterus laculatus
      - - - Eurypterus pittsfordensis
          - Eurypterus leopoldi
          - Eurypterus serratus
        - - - Eurypterus remipes
            - Eurypterus lacustris
          - - Eurypterus henningsmoeni
            - Eurypterus tetragonophthalmus

== Species ==
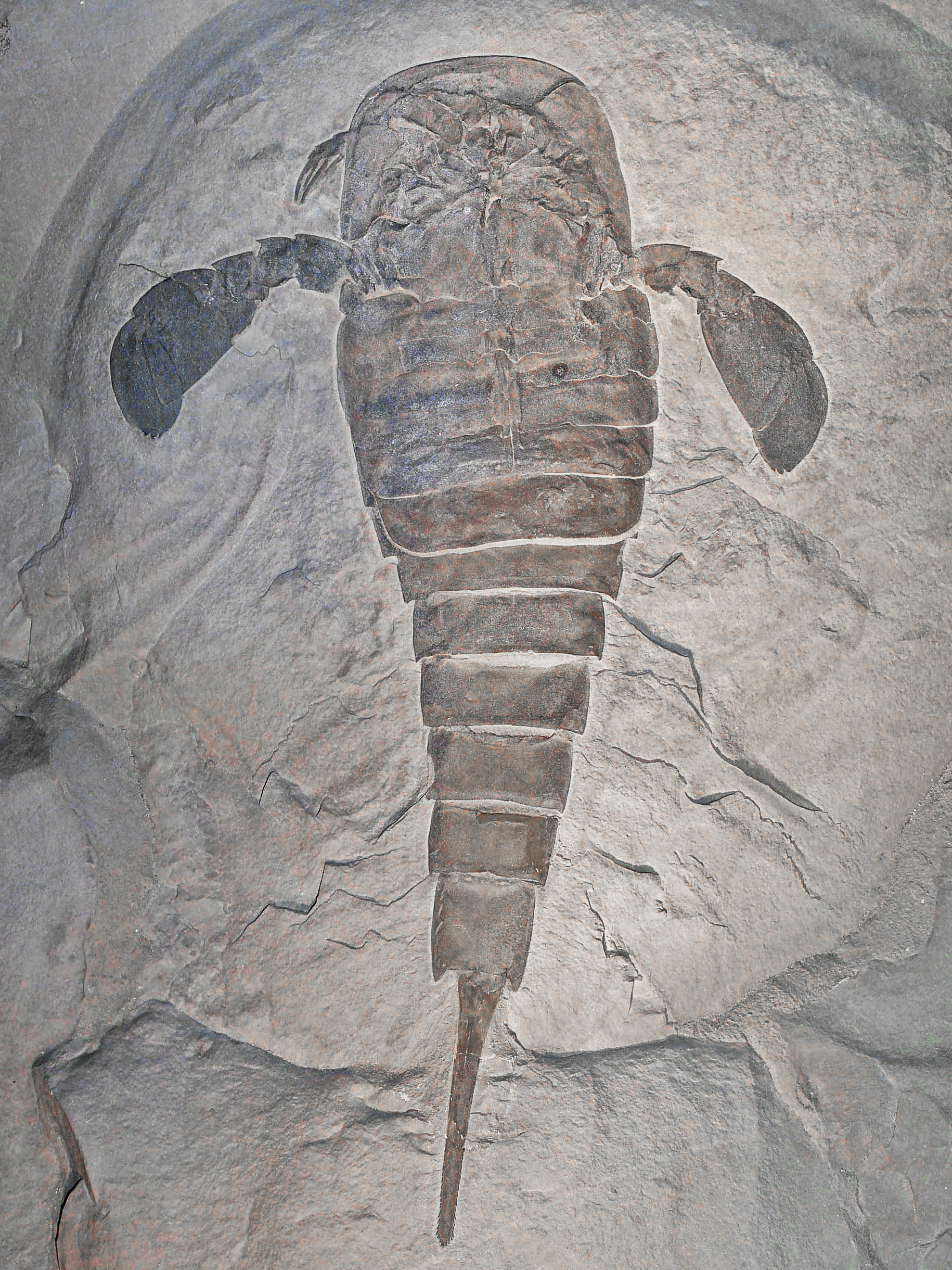
E. remipes from the State Museum of Natural History Karlsruhe, Germany.

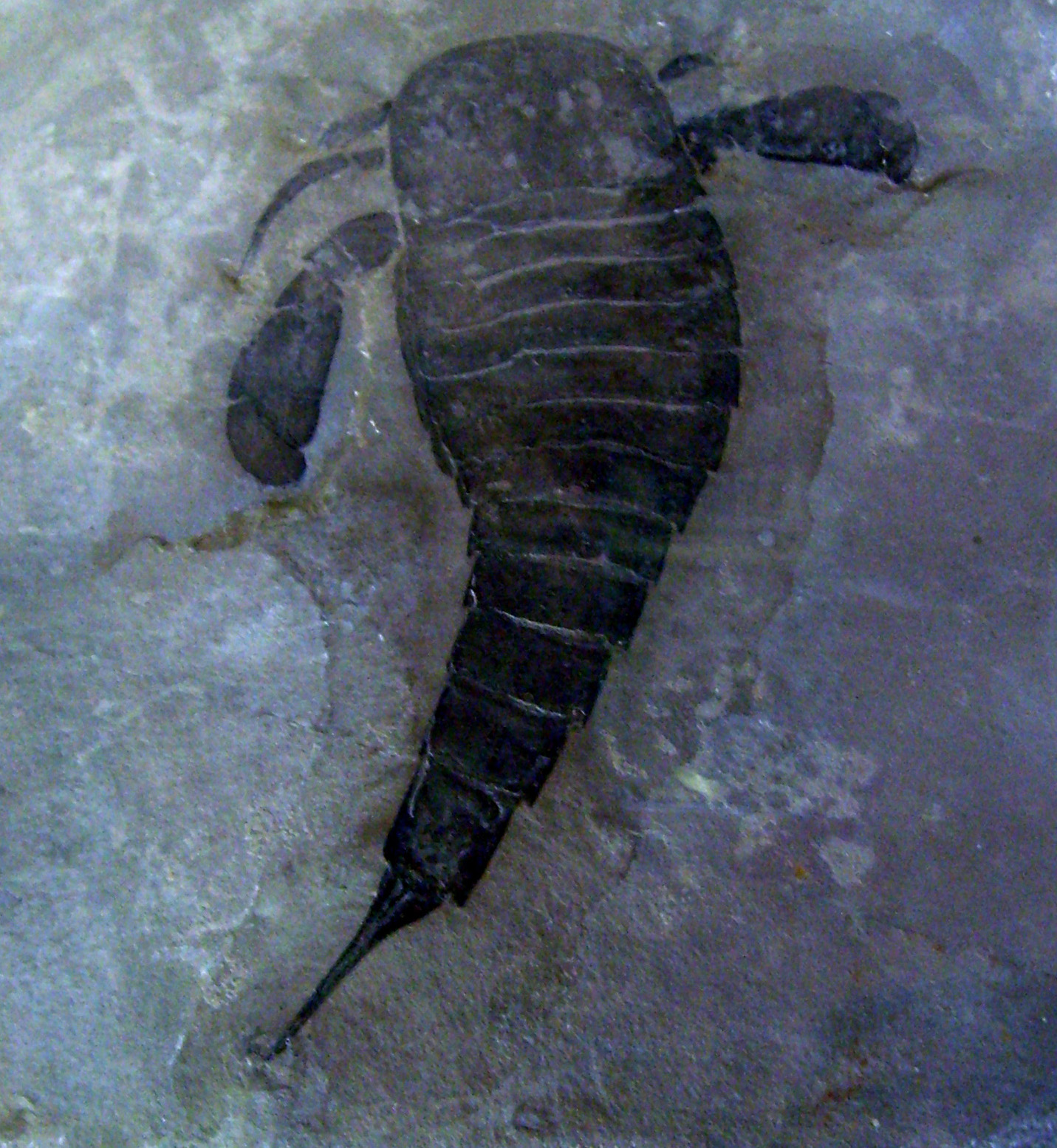
E. lacustris from the Muséum national d'histoire naturelle, France.

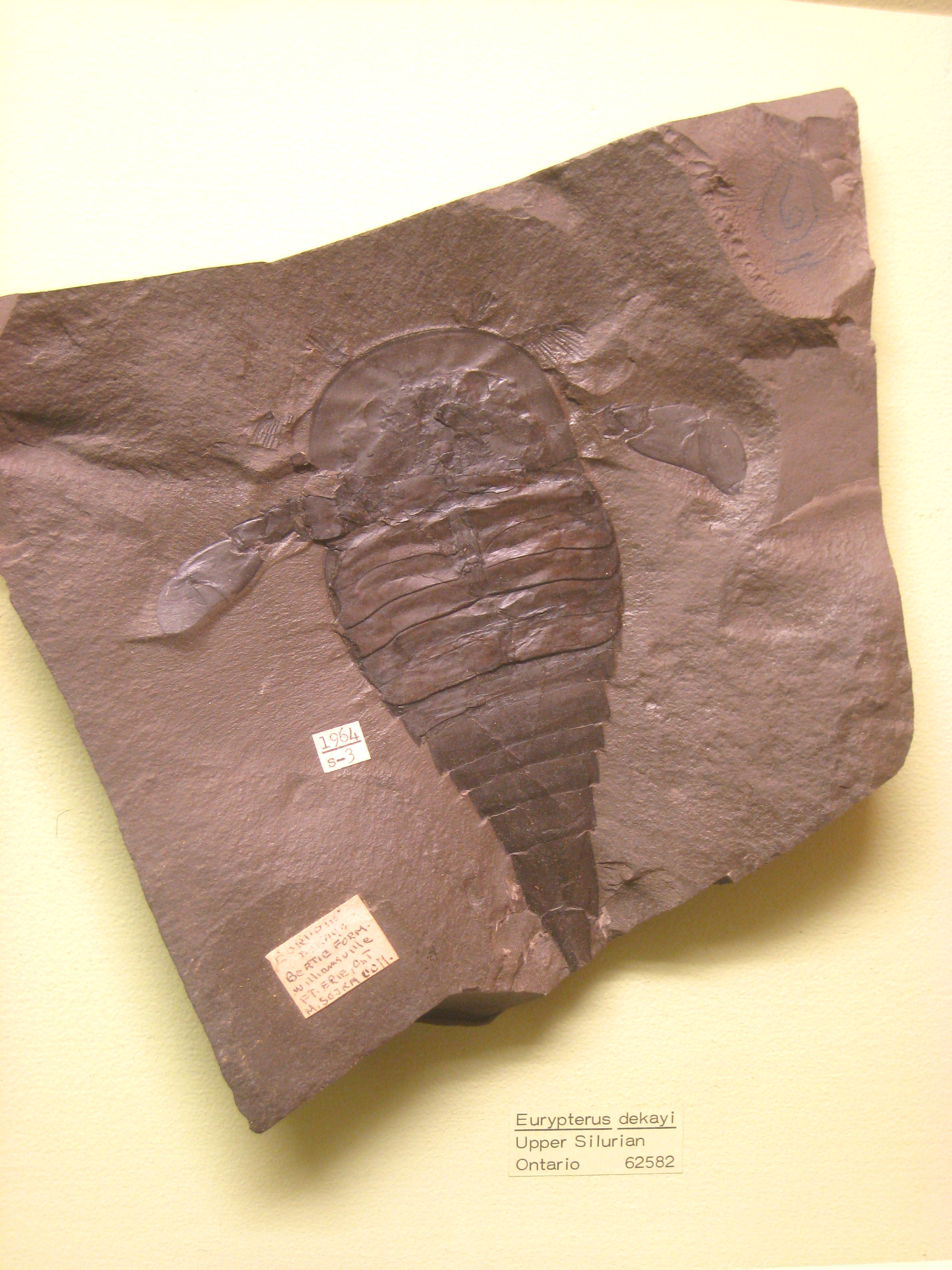
E. dekayi from the University of Michigan Exhibit Museum of Natural History, Michigan.

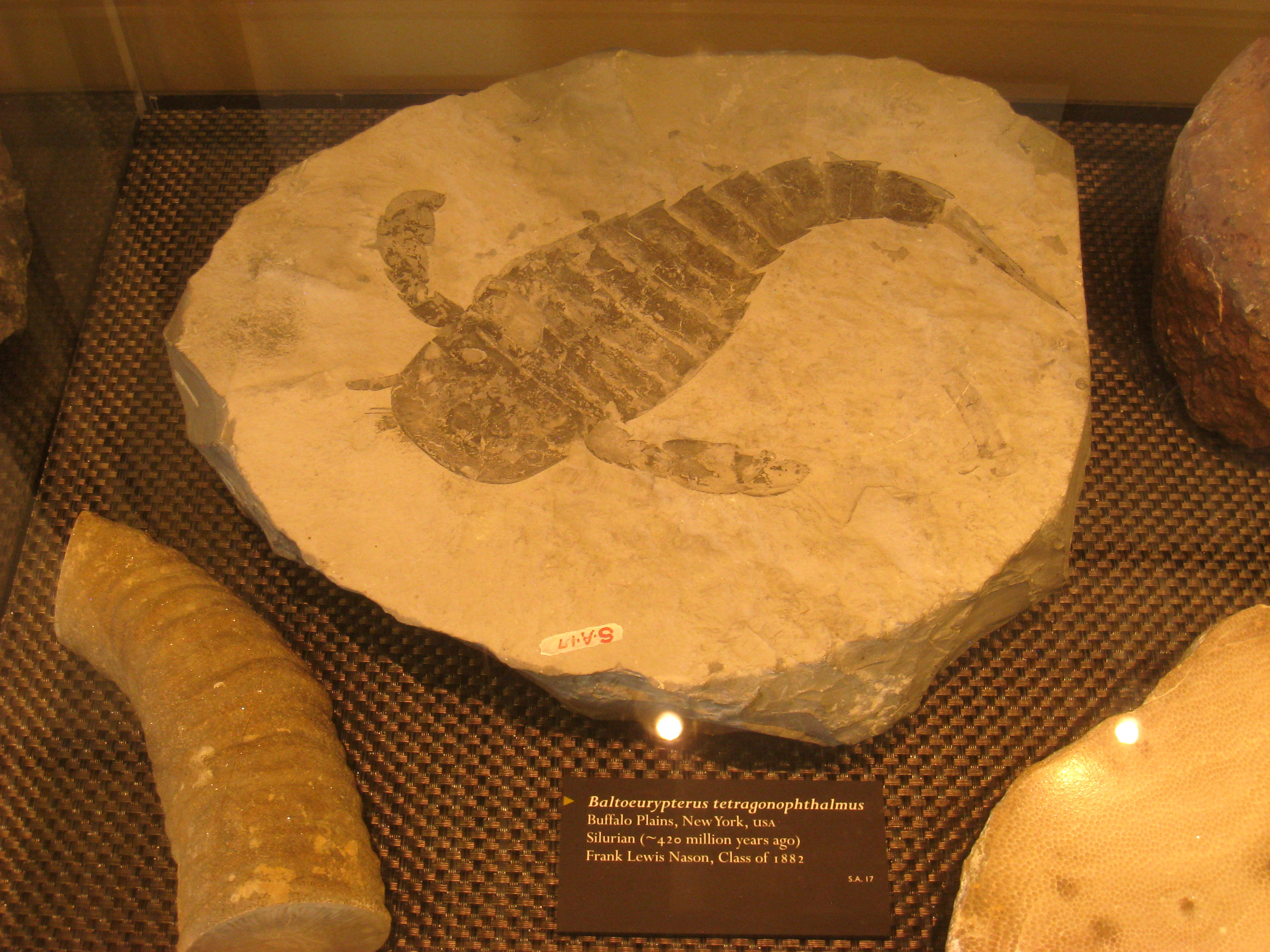
Eurypterus tetragonophthalmus from the Amherst College Museum of Natural History, Massachusetts.

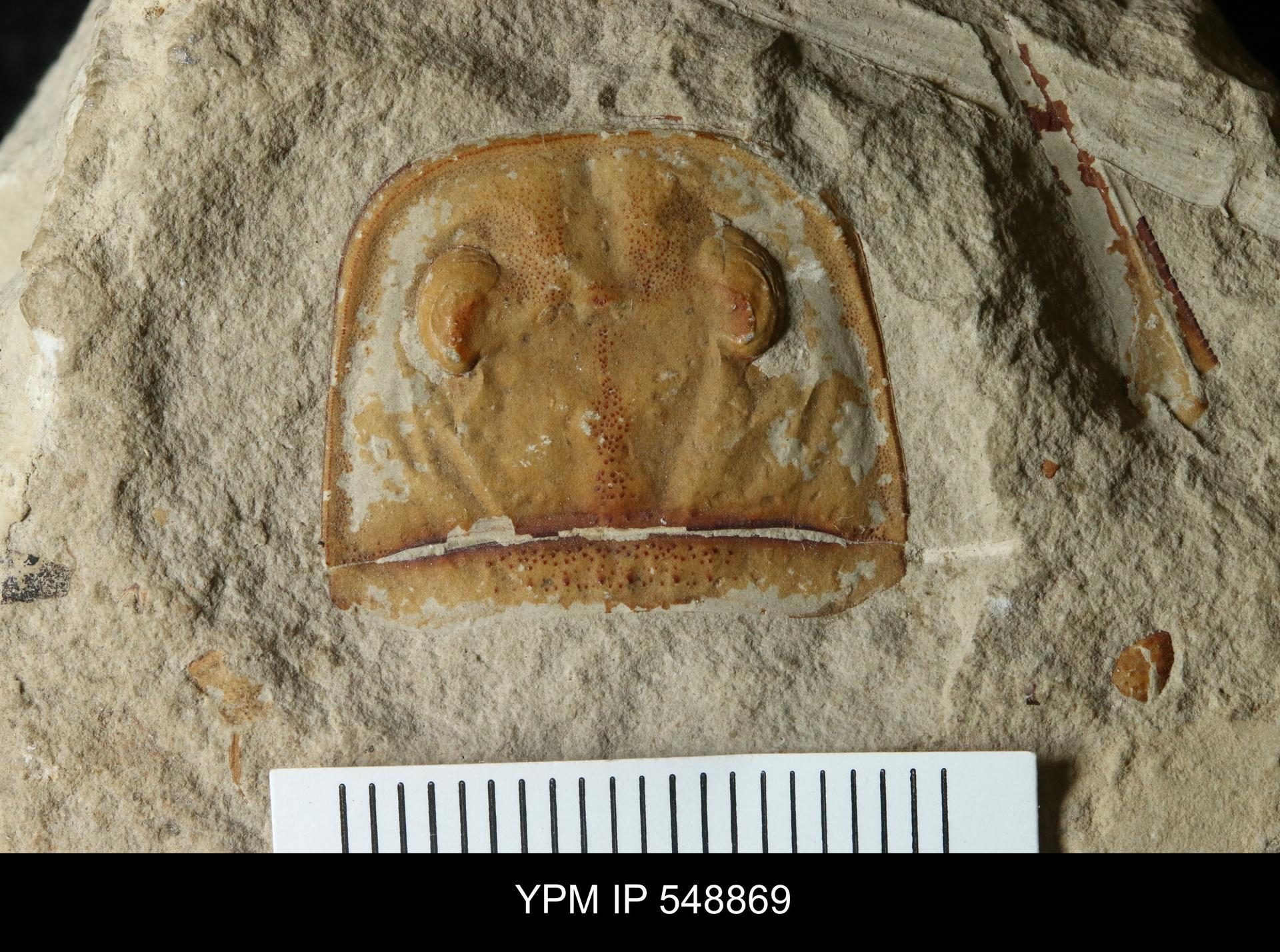
Eurypterus fischeri caparace from the collections of the Yale Peabody Museum of Natural History, Connecticut.

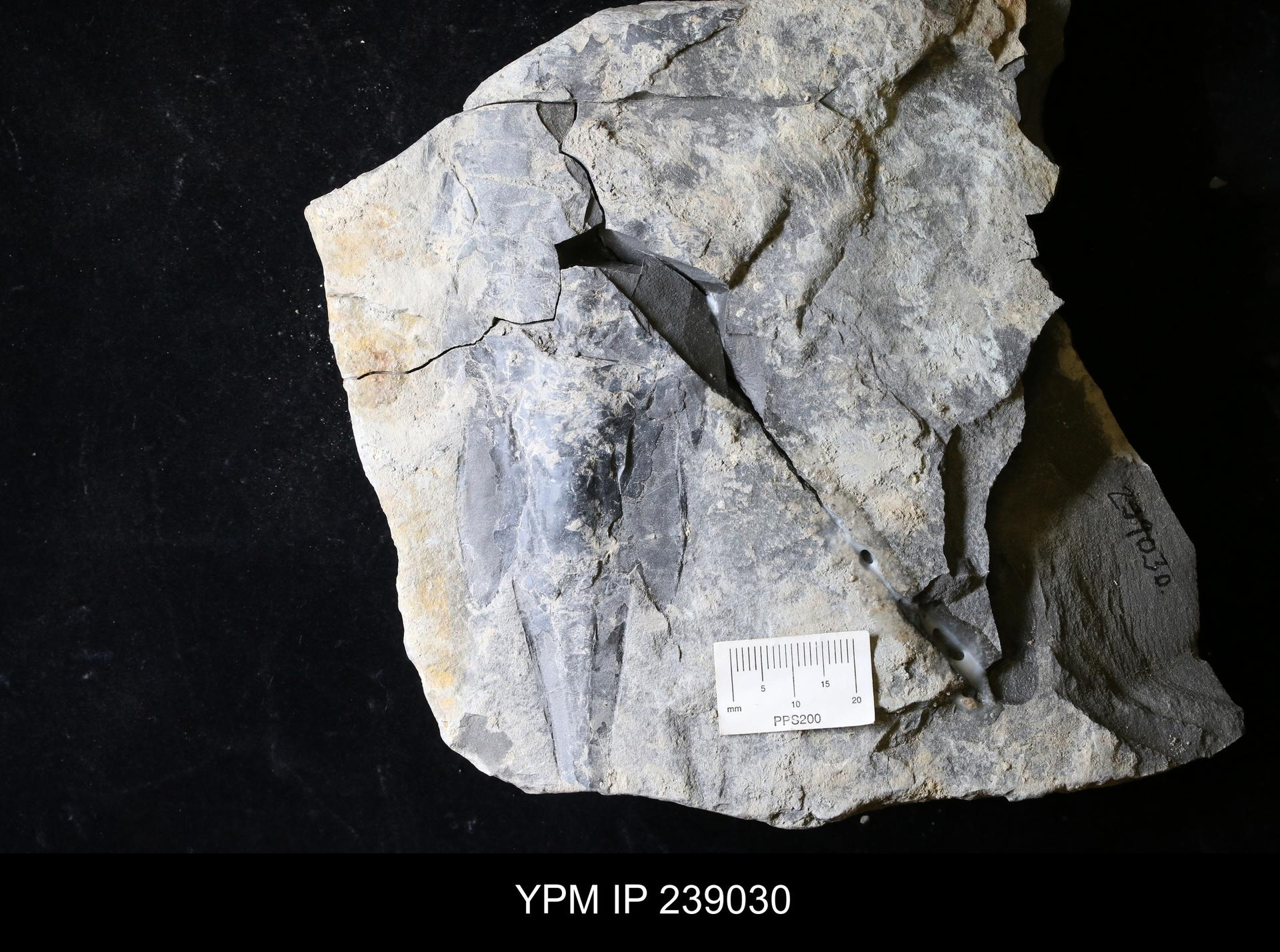
Eurypterus pittsfordensis partial abdomen, pretelson and telson from the collections of the Yale Peabody Museum of Natural History, Connecticut.

Species belonging to the genus, their diagnostic descriptions, synonyms (if present), and distribution are as follows:

Valid species

- Eurypterus dekayi Hall, 1859 – Silurian, United States & Canada
  - No raised scales on the posterior margin of the carapace or of the three front-most tergites. The rest of the tergites each have four raised scales. Four to six spines on each podomere of Appendages III and IV. Pretelson has large, rounded epimera without ornamentation on the margins. The species is very similar to E. laculatus. The species is named after James Ellsworth De Kay. Specimens recovered from New York and Ontario.
- Eurypterus flintstonensis Swartz, 1923 – Silurian, USA
  - Perhaps a synonym of E. remipes or E. lacustris. Probably named after Flintstone, Georgia (?). Specimen recovered from eastern United States. Recognized as valid by Lamsdell (2025).
- Eurypterus hankeni Tetlie, 2006 – Silurian, Norway
  - Small Eurypterus species, averaging at 10 to 15 centimetres (3.9 to 5.9 in) long. The largest specimen found is about 20 to 25 centimetres (7.9 to 9.8 in) in length. They can be distinguished by pustules and six scales at the rear margin of their carapaces. Appendages I to IV has two spines on each podomere. The postabdomen have small epimera. The pretelson has long pointed epimera. Telson has striations near its attachment to the pretelson. The species is named after Norwegian paleontologist Nils-Martin Hanken, of the University of Tromsø. Found in the Steinsfjorden Formation of Ringerike, Norway.
- Eurypterus henningsmoeni Tetlie, 2002 – Silurian, Norway
  - Eurypterus with broad paddles and metastoma. Postabdomen has small epimera. Pretelson has large rounded epimera with imbricate scales (overlapping, similar to fish scales). It is very similar and closely related to E. tetragonophthalmus. The species was named after the Norwegian paleontologist Gunnar Henningsmoen. Found in Bærum, Norway.
- Eurypterus laculatus Kjellesvig-Waering, 1958 – Silurian, USA & Canada
  - The visual area of the compound eyes of this species are surrounded by depressions. The ocelli and the ocellar mound are small. No pustules or raised scales on the carapace or the first tergite. It is probably closely related to E. dekayi. Its specific epithet means 'four-cornered', from Latin laculatus ('four-cornered, checkered'). Found in New York and Ontario.
- Eurypterus lacustris Harlan, 1834 – Silurian, USA & Canada
  - One of the two most common Eurypterus fossils found. It is very similar to E. remipes and often found in the same localities, but the eyes are placed at a more posterior position on the carapace of E. lacustris. It is also slightly larger with a slightly narrower metastoma. Its status as a distinct species was once disputed before diagnostic analysis by Tollerton in 1993. Its specific name means 'from a lake', from Latin lacus ('lake'). Found in New York and Ontario.
- Eurypterus megalops Clarke & Ruedemann, 1912 – Silurian, USA
  - Specific name means "large eye", from Greek μέγας (megas 'big or large') and ὤψ (ōps 'eye'). Discovered in New York, United States.
- Eurypterus ornatus Leutze, 1958 – Silurian, USA
  - Ornamentation of pustules on the entire surface of the carapace and at least the first tergite. Does not possess raised scales. Its specific name means 'adorned', from Latin ōrnātus ('adorned, ornate'). Recovered from Fayette, Ohio.
- Eurypterus pittsfordensis Sarle, 1903 – Silurian, USA
  - The posterior margin of the carapace has three raised scales. Appendages II to IV has two spines per podomere. The metastoma is rhomboid in shape with a deep notch at the front part. The postabdomen has serrated fringes at the middle with small angular epimera at the sides. The pretelson has large, semiangular epimera with angular striations at the margins. The telson is styliform with sparse angular striations at the margins. The name of the species comes from its place of discovery – the Salina shale formations of Pittsford, New York.
- Eurypterus quebecensis Kjellesvig-Waering, 1958 – Silurian, Canada
  - Has six raised scales on the posterior margin of the carapace but does not possess pustule ornamentation. It is named after the location it was recovered from Quebec, Canada.
- Eurypterus remipes DeKay, 1825 – Silurian, USA, Canada
  - The most common Eurypterus species. Has four raised scales at the posterior margin of the carapace. Appendages I to IV has two spines on each podomere. Postabdomen has small epimera. Pretelson has small, semiangular epimera with imbricate scale ornamentation at the margins. The telson has serrated margins along most of its length. It is very similar to E. lacustris and can often only be distinguished by the position of the eyes. The specific name means 'oar-foot', from Latin rēmus ('oar') and pes ('foot'). Found in New York and Ontario, and is the state fossil of New York.
- Eurypterus serratus (Jones & Woodward, 1888) – Silurian, Sweden
  - Similar to E. pittsfordensis and E. leopoldi but can be distinguished by the dense angular striations on their styliform telson. The specific name means 'serrated', from Latin serrātus ('sawn [into pieces]'). Originally discovered from Gotland, Sweden.
- Eurypterus tetragonophthalmus Fischer, 1839 – Silurian, Ukraine & Estonia
  - Four raised scales on the posterior margin of the carapce. Appendages II to IV each have two spines on each podomere. Postabdomen has small epimera. The pretelson has large, rounded epimera with imbricate scale ornamentation at the margins. Telson has imbricate scale ornamentations at the margins of the base which become serrations towards the tip. The specific name means 'four-edged eye', from Greek τέσσαρες (tessares 'four'), γωνία (gōnia 'angle'), and ὀφθαλμός (ophthalmos 'eye'). Found in the Rootsiküla Formation of Saaremaa (Ösel), Estonia, with additional discoveries in Ukraine, Norway, and possibly Moldova and Romania.

Invalid/reclassified species

- "Eurypterus cephalaspis" = Selkiepterella
- "Eurypterus clavipes" = E. tetragonophthalmus
- "Eurypterus fischeri" = E. tetragonophthalmus
- "Eurypterus pachycheirus" = E. lacustris
- "Eurypterus robustus" = E. lacustris
- "Eurypterus leopoldi" = E. lacustris
- "Eurypterus minor" = Pentlandopterus

The list does not include the large number of fossils previously classified under Eurypterus. Most of them are now reclassified to other genera, identified as other animals (like crustaceans) or pseudofossils, or remains of doubtful placement.

== Paleobiology ==
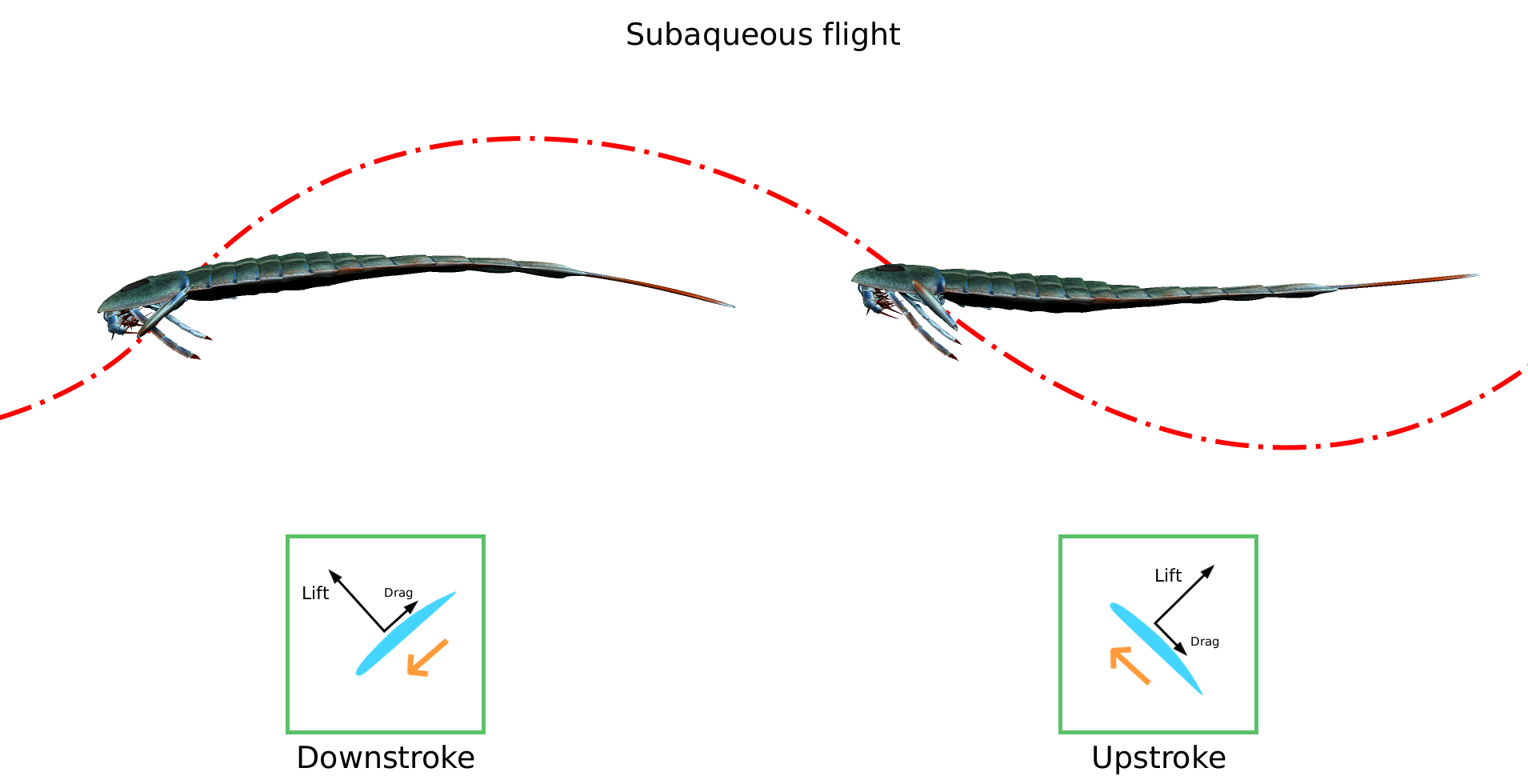
Subaqueous flight in Eurypterus.

Eurypterus belongs to the suborder Eurypterina, eurypterids in which the sixth appendage had developed a broad swimming paddle remarkably similar to that of the modern-day swimming crab. Modeling studies on Eurypterus swimming behavior suggest that they utilized a drag-based rowing type of locomotion where appendages moved synchronously in near-horizontal planes. The paddle blades are almost vertically oriented on the backward and down stroke, pushing the animal forward and lifting it up. The blades are then oriented horizontally on the recovery stroke to slash through the water without pushing the animal back. This type of swimming is exhibited by crabs and water beetles.

An alternative hypothesis for Eurypterus swimming behavior is that individuals were capable of underwater flying (or subaqueous flight), in which the sinuous motions and shape of the paddles themselves acting as hydrofoils are enough to generate lift. This type is similar to that found in sea turtles and sea lions. It has a relatively slower acceleration rate than the rowing type, especially since adults have proportionally smaller paddles than juveniles. But since the larger sizes of adults mean a higher drag coefficient, using this type of propulsion is more energy-efficient.

Juveniles probably swam using the rowing type, the rapid acceleration afforded by this propulsion is more suited for quickly escaping predators. A small 16.5 cm (6.5 in) Eurypterus could achieve two and a half body lengths per second immediately. Larger adults, meanwhile, probably swam with the subaqueous flight type. The maximum velocity of adults when cruising would have been 3 to 4 m (9.8 to 13.1 ft) per second, slightly faster than turtles and sea otters.

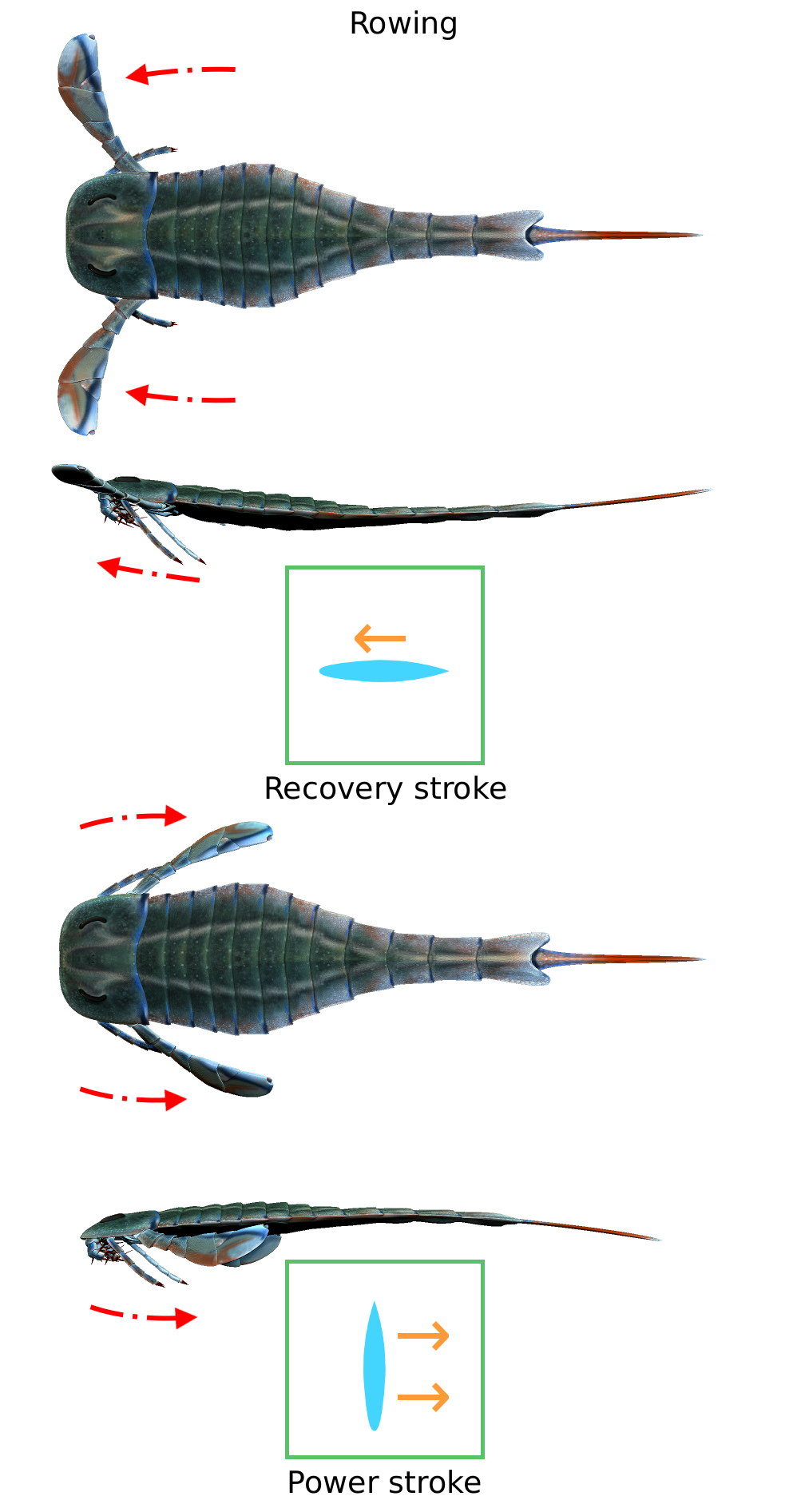
Rowing in Eurypterus.

Trace fossil evidence indicates that Eurypterus employed a rowing stroke when in close proximity to the seafloor. Arcuites bertiensis is an ichnospecies that includes a pair of crescent-shaped impressions and a short medial drag, and it has been found in upper Silurian eurypterid Lagerstatten in Ontario and Pennsylvania. This trace fossil is very similar to traces made by modern aquatic swimming insects that row such as water boatmen, and is considered to have been made by juvenile to adult-sized eurypterids while swimming in very shallow nearshore marine environments. The morphology of A. bertiensis suggests that Eurypterus had the ability to move its swimming appendages in both the horizontal and vertical plane.

Eurypterus did not swim to hunt, rather they simply swam in order to move from one feeding site to another quickly. Most of the time they walked on the substrate with their legs (including their swimming leg). They were generalist species, equally likely to engage in predation or scavenging. They hunted small soft-bodied invertebrates like worms. They utilized the mass of spines on their front appendages to both kill and hold them while they used their chelicerae to rip off pieces small enough to swallow. Young individuals may also have fallen prey to cannibalism by larger adults.

Eurypterus were most probably marine animals, as their remains are mostly found in intertidal shallow environments. The concentrations of Eurypterus fossils in certain sites has been interpreted to be a result of mass mating and molting behavior. Juveniles were likely to have inhabited nearshore hypersaline environments, safer from predators, and moved to deeper waters as they grew older and larger. Adults that reach sexual maturity would then migrate en masse to shore areas in order to mate, lay eggs, and molt. Activities that would have made them more vulnerable to predators. This could also explain why the vast majority of fossils found in such sites are molts and not of actual animals. The same behavior can be seen in modern horseshoe crabs.

=== Respiration ===
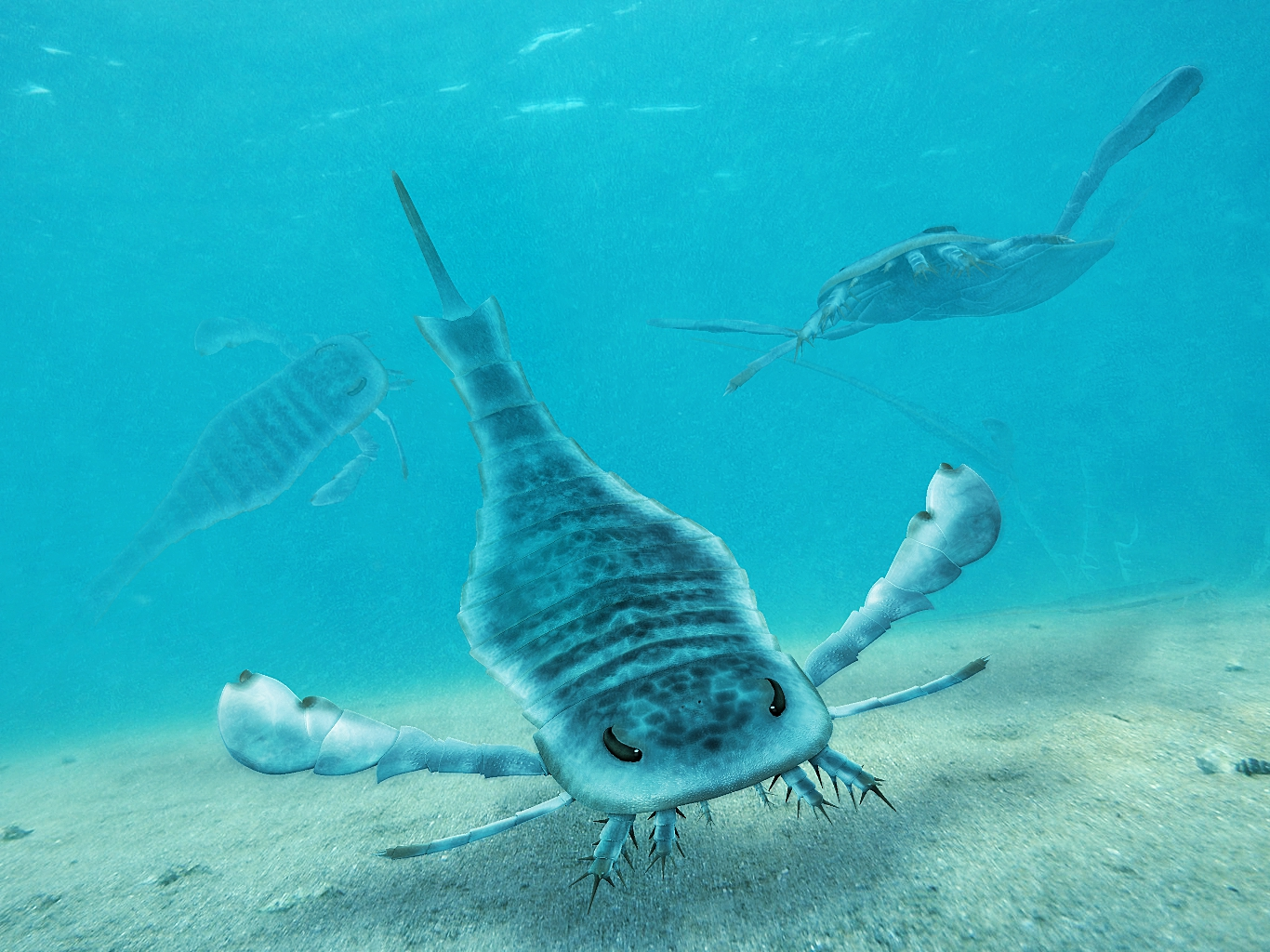
Life restoration of Eurypterus in its environment

Examinations of the respiratory systems of Eurypterus have led many paleontologists to conclude that it was capable of breathing air and walking on land for a short amount of time. Eurypterus had two types of respiratory systems. Its main organs for breathing were the book gills inside the segments of the mesosoma. These structures were supported by semicircular 'ribs' and were probably attached near the center of the body, similar to the gills of modern horseshoe crabs. They were protected under platelike appendages (which actually formed the apparent 'belly' of Eurypterus) known as Blattfüsse. These gills may have also played a role in osmoregulation.

The second system are the Kiemenplatten, also referred to as gill-tracts. These oval-shaped areas within the body wall of the preabdomen. Their surfaces are covered with numerous small spines arranged into hexagonal 'rosettes'. These areas were vascularized, hence the conclusion that they were secondary breathing organs.

The function of the book gills are usually interpreted to be for aquatic breathing, while the Kiemenplatten are supplementary for temporary breathing on land. However, some authors have argued that the two systems alone could not have supported an organism the size of Eurypterus. Both structures might actually have been for breathing air and the true gills (for underwater breathing) of Eurypterus have yet to be discovered. Eurypterus, however, were undoubtedly primarily aquatic.

=== Ontogeny ===
Juvenile Eurypterus differed from adults in several ways. Their carapaces were narrower and longer (parabolic) in contrast to the trapezoidal carapaces of adults. The eyes are aligned almost laterally but move to a more anterior location during growth. The preabdomen also lengthened, increasing the overall length of the opisthosoma. The swimming legs also became narrower and the telsons shorter and broader (though in E. tetragonophthalmus and E. henningsmoeni the telsons changed from being angular in juveniles to larger and more rounded in adults). All these changes are believed to be a result of the respiratory and reproductive requirements of adults.

== Paleoecology ==
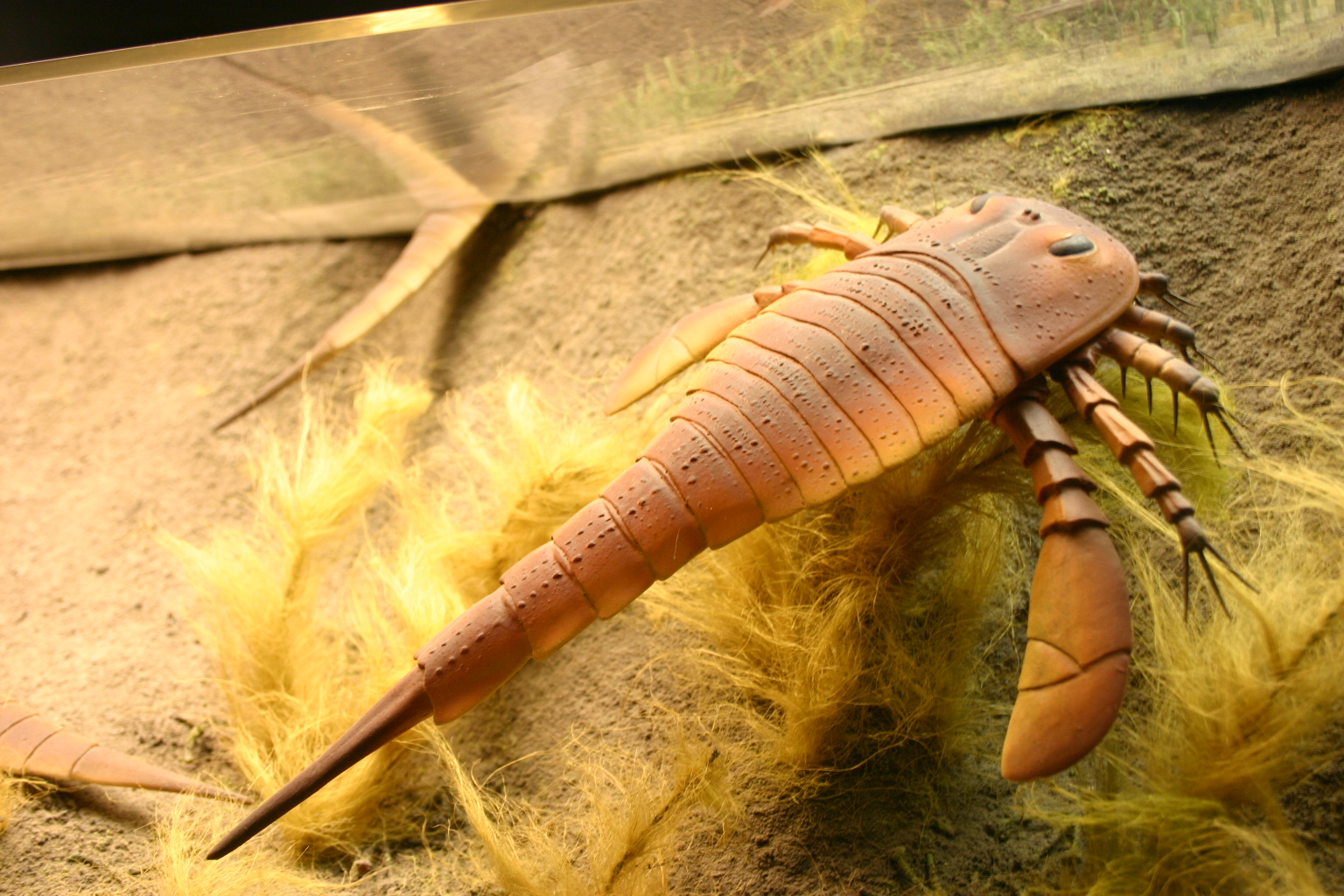
Model in the Smithsonian National Museum of Natural History Hall of Fossils.

Members of Eurypterus existed for a relatively short time, yet they are the most abundant eurypterids found today. They flourished between the Late Llandovery epoch (around 432 million years ago) to sometime during the Přídolí epoch (418.1 million years ago) of the Silurian period. A span of only around 10 to 14 million years.

During this period, the landmasses were mostly restricted to the Southern Hemisphere of the Earth, with the supercontinent Gondwana straddling the South Pole. The equator had three continents (Avalonia, Baltica, and Laurentia) which slowly drifted together to form the second supercontinent of Laurussia (also known as Euramerica, not to be confused with Laurasia).

The ancestors of Eurypterus were believed to have originated from Baltica (eastern Laurussia, modern western Eurasia) based on the earliest recorded fossils. During the Silurian, they spread to Laurentia (western Laurussia, modern North America) when the two continents began to collide. They rapidly colonized the continent as invasive species, becoming the most dominant eurypterid in the region. This accounts for why they are the most commonly found genus of eurypterids today. Eurypterus (and other members of Eurypteroidea), however, were unable to cross vast expanses of oceans between the two supercontinents during the Silurian. Their range were thus limited to the coastlines and the large, shallow, and hypersaline inland seas of Laurussia.

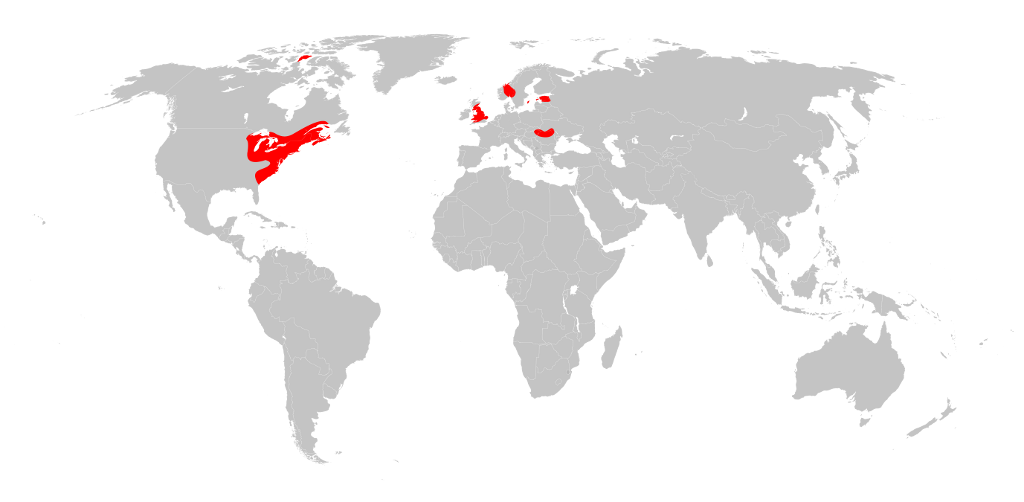
Locations where Eurypterus fossils have been found

They are now only known from fossils from North America, Europe, and northwestern Asia, cratons that were the former components of Laurussia. While three species of Eurypterus were purportedly discovered in China in 1957, the evidence of them belonging to the genus (or if they were even eurypterids at all) is nonexistent. No other traces of Eurypterus in modern continents from Gondwana are currently known.

Eurypterus are very common fossils in their regions of occurrence, millions of specimens are possible in a given area, though access to the rock formations may be difficult. Most fossil eurypterids are the disjointed shed exoskeleton (known as exuviae) of individuals after molting (ecdysis). Some are complete but are most probably exuviae as well. Fossils of the actual remains of eurypterids (i.e. their carcasses) are relatively rare. Fossil eurypterids are often deposited in characteristic windrows, probably a result of wave and wind action.

== See also ==
- List of eurypterids
