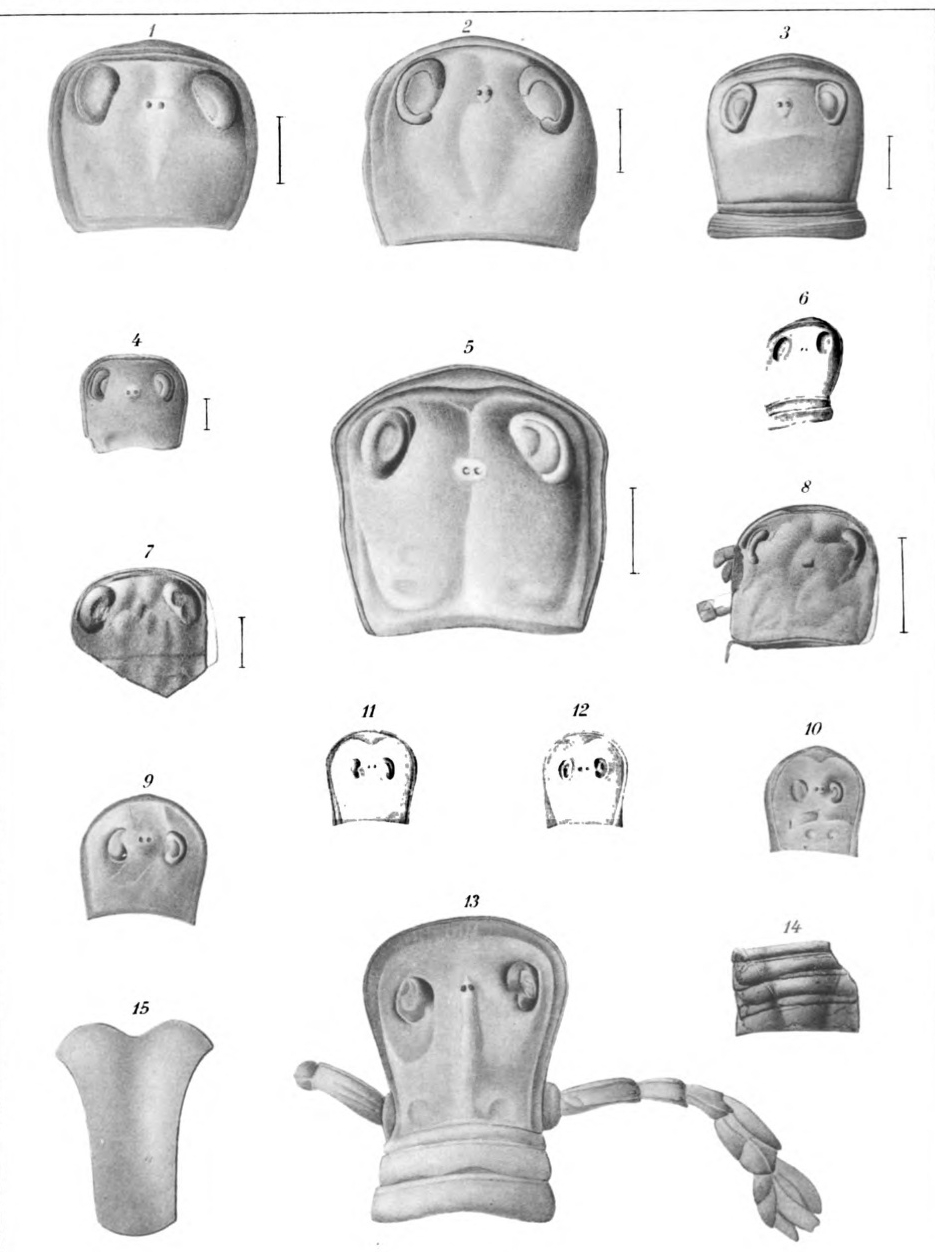
- Fossils of Kiaeropterus otisius, Ruedemannipterus stylonuroides and Hughmilleria socialis

Scientific classification
- Kingdom: Animalia
- Phylum: Arthropoda
- Subphylum: Chelicerata
- Order: †Eurypterida
- Family: †Dolichopteridae
- Genus: †Ruedemannipterus; Kjellesvig-Waering, 1966

Type species
- Ruedemannipterus stylonuroides Clarke & Ruedemann, 1912

= Ruedemannipterus =

Ruedemannipterus Temporal range: Silurian

Extinct genus of arthropods

Ruedemannipterus is a genus of prehistoric eurypterid classified as part of the family Dolichopteridae. The genus contains one species, R. stylonuroides, known from the Silurian of New York.
