= Paraeurypterus =

Paraeurypterus Temporal range: Late Ordovician
- Fossil of P. anatoliensis

Scientific classification
- Kingdom: Animalia
- Phylum: Arthropoda
- Subphylum: Chelicerata
- Order: †Eurypterida
- Superfamily: †Dolichopteroidea
- Family: †Dolichopteridae
- Genus: †Paraeurypterus; Lamsdell, Hoşgör & Selden, 2013

Type species
- †Paraeurypterus anatoliensis Lamsdell, Hoşgör & Selden, 2013

Extinct genus of sea scorpions

Paraeurypterus is a genus of prehistoric eurypterid from the Late Ordovician period. The genus contains one species, P. anatoliensis, known from Şort Tepe in Turkey. Paraeurypterus is classified as part of the family Dolichopteridae.

== See also ==
- List of eurypterids
