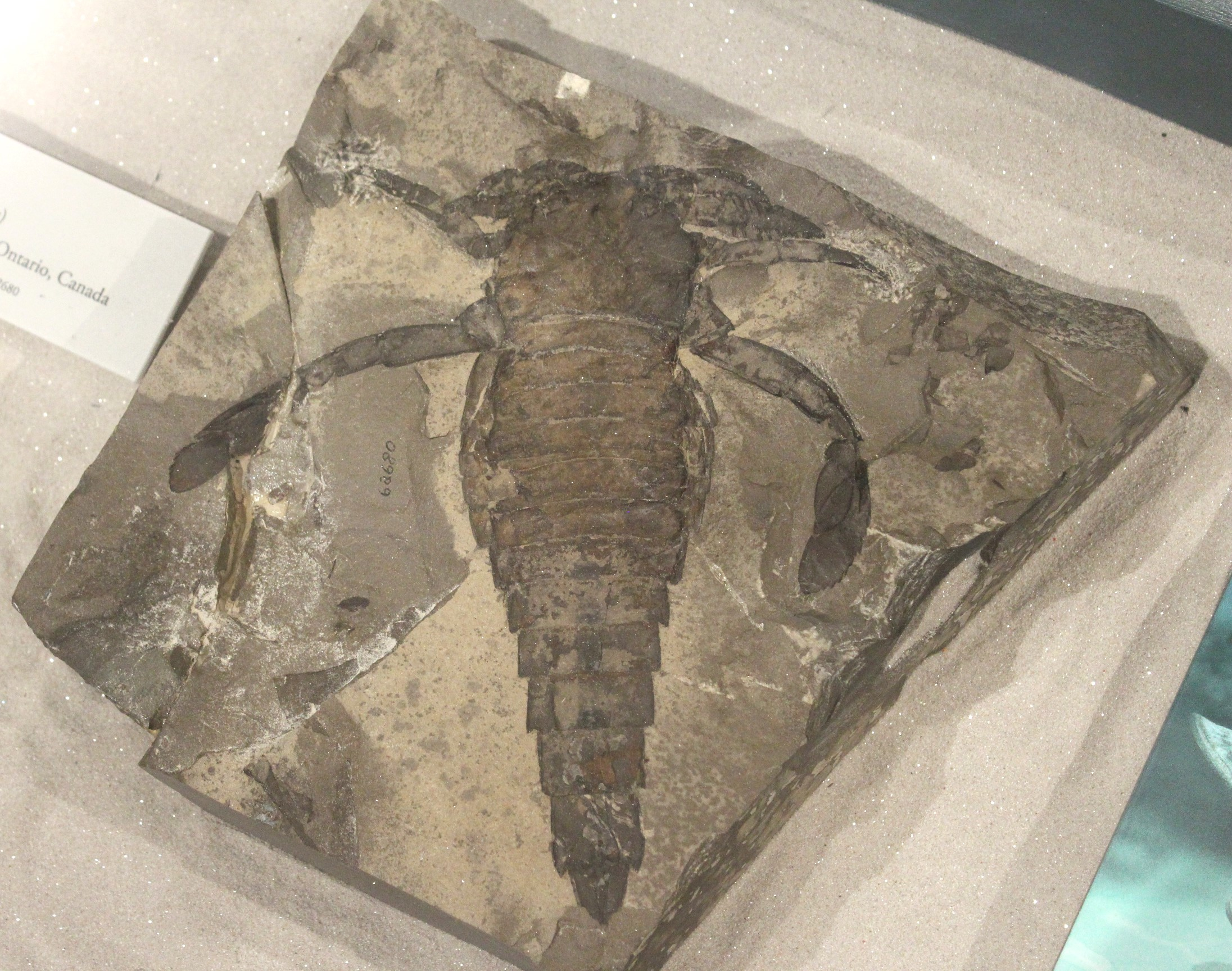
- D. macrocheirus fossil, University of Michigan Museum of Natural History

Scientific classification
- Kingdom: Animalia
- Phylum: Arthropoda
- Subphylum: Chelicerata
- Order: †Eurypterida
- Family: †Dolichopteridae
- Genus: †Dolichopterus; Hall, 1859

Type species
- Dolichopterus macrocheirus Hall, 1859

Other species
- D. gotlandicus Kjellesvig-Waering, 1979; D. jewetti Caster & Kjellesvig-Waering, 1956

= Dolichopterus =

Dolichopterus Temporal range: Silurian

Extinct genus of arthropods

Dolichopterus is a genus of prehistoric sea scorpions, arthropods in the order Eurypterida. Fossils of Dolichopterus have been discovered in deposits ranging from Silurian to Devonian, and have been referred to several different species, some of them of dubious affinity to this genus.

== Distribution ==
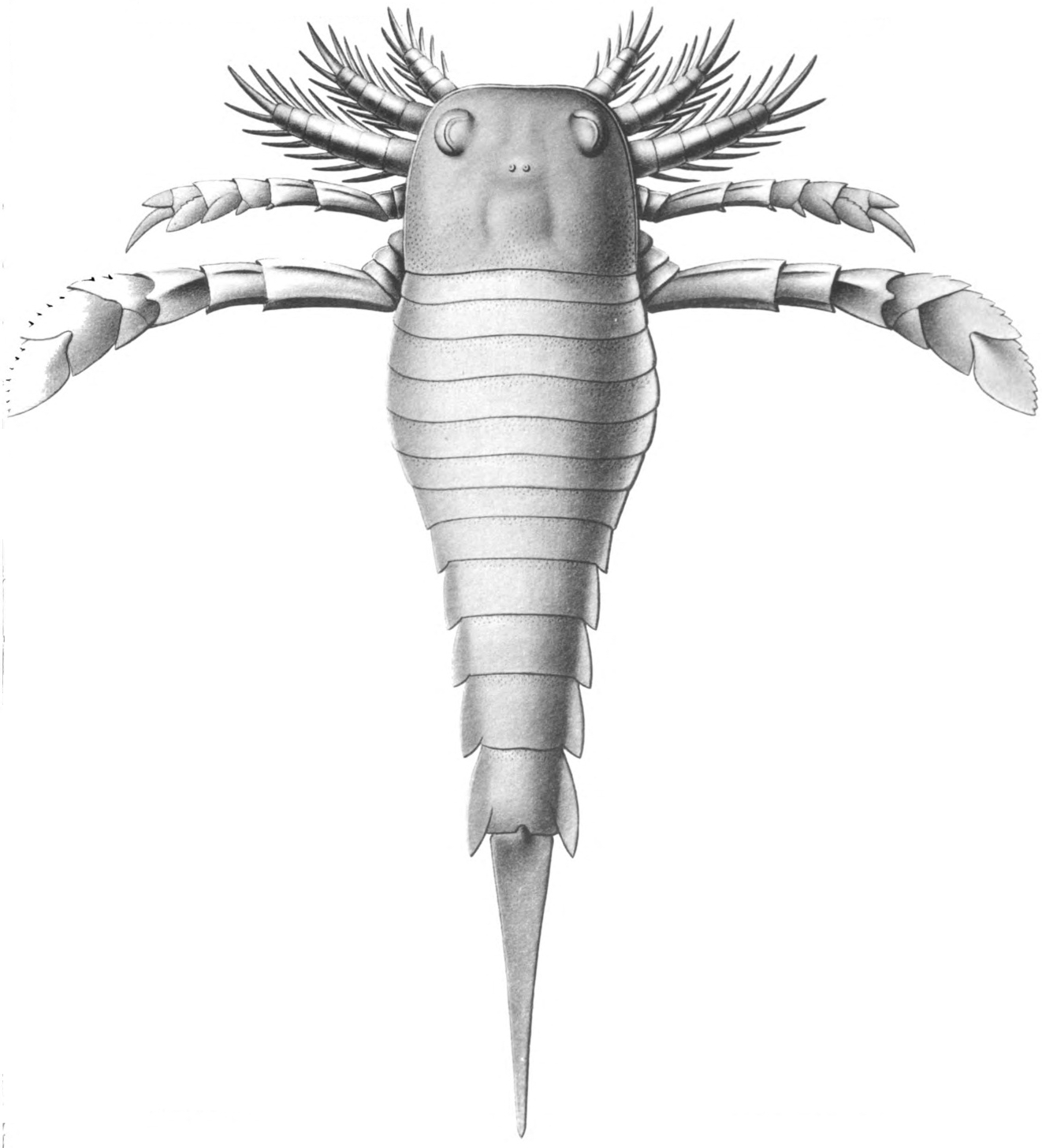
Restoration of D. macrocheirus

It lived in the shelf or epicontinental seas of the region where Avalonia, Baltica and Laurentia met during the Caledonian orogeny; its fossils have been found in modern-day North America and the Baltic region. They were about 25–30 centimetres (10–12 in) long.

== Description ==
Dolichopteridae, which lived in the Silurian and Devonian periods, had outer surfaces that were either smooth with pustules and semilunar scales. Their compound eyes were arcuate and located anteriorly on the prosoma (head). Their abdomens had epimers (lateral projections). The telson (the posteriormost division of the body) was lanceolate. Their chelicerae were small, and the first three pairs of walking lags were stout, with powerful spines. The last pair of walking lags had supplementary lobes, while the swimming lags had the last joint enlarged, as part of the paddle. The male genital appendage was long.

Dolichopterus is distinguishable by its nearly smooth outer surface; its subquadrate prosoma (head), and the slightly serrated margins on the distal joints and lobes of the swimming legs.

== See also ==
- List of eurypterids
