= Arcuites =

Arcuites Temporal range: Silurian

Trace fossil classification
- Domain: Eukaryota
- Kingdom: Animalia
- Phylum: Arthropoda
- Subphylum: Chelicerata
- Order: †Eurypterida
- Ichnogenus: †Arcuites; Vrazo & Ciurca, 2017

Type ichnospecies
- †Arcuites bertiensis Vrazo & Ciurca, 2017

Arcuites is an ichnofossil genus, interpreted as a eurypterid swimming trace. Traces produced by swimming eurypterids were described from the Silurian Williamsville Formation (Ontario, Canada) and Tonoloway Formation (Pennsylvania, United States) by Vrazo & Ciurca in 2017 as a new ichnogenus and ichnospecies, named Arcuites bertiensis.
