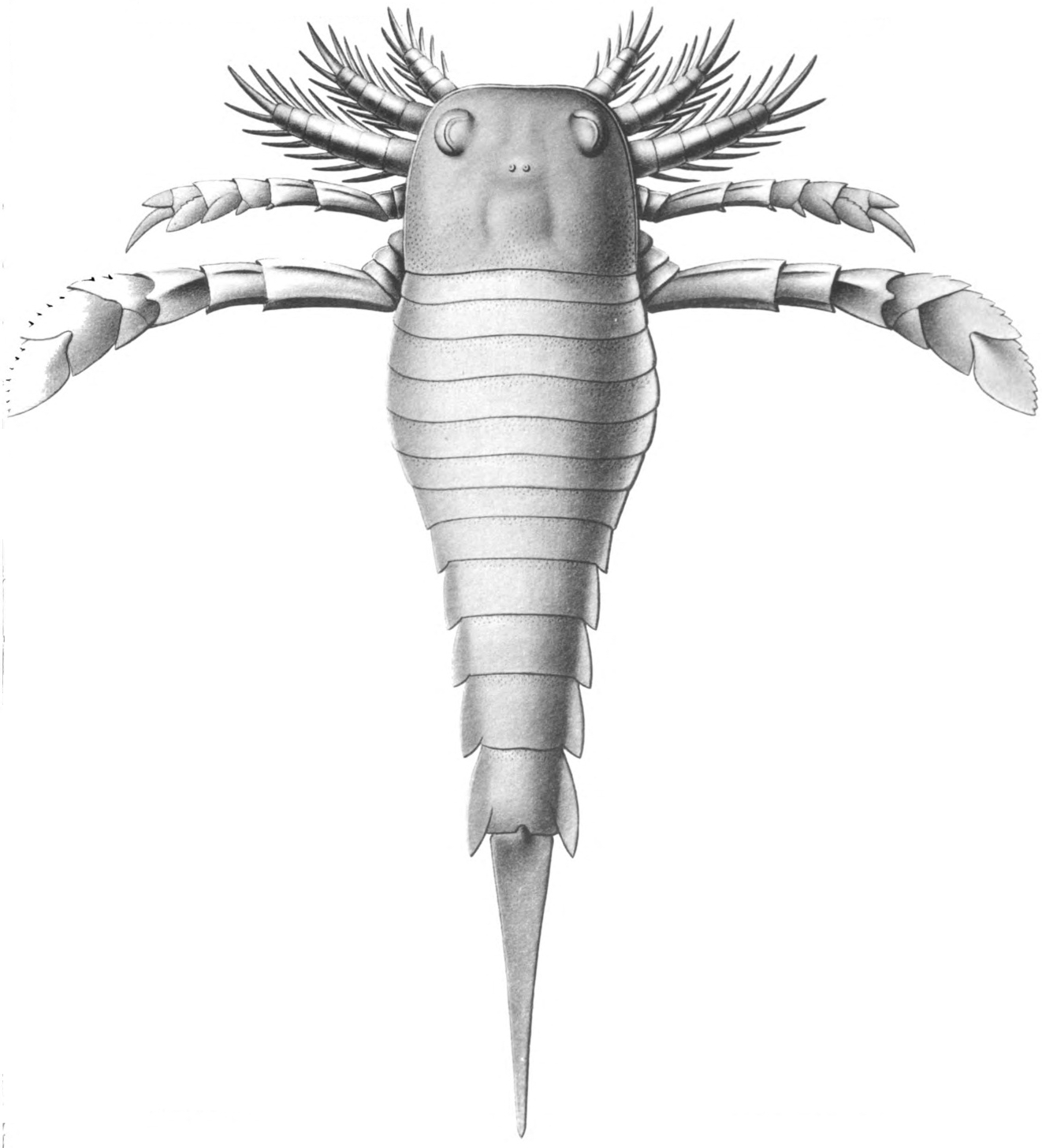
- Restoration of Dolichopterus

Scientific classification
- Kingdom: Animalia
- Phylum: Arthropoda
- Subphylum: Chelicerata
- Order: †Eurypterida
- Suborder: †Eurypterina
- Superfamily: †Dolichopteroidea
- Family: †Dolichopteridae; Kjellesvig-Waering & Størmer, 1952

Genera
- †Clarkeipterus; †Dolichopterus; †Malongia; †Paraeurypterus; †Pentlandopterus; †Ruedemannipterus

= Dolichopteridae =

Dolichopteridae Temporal range: Silurian–Devonian

Extinct family of Devonian organisms

Dolichopteridae is an extinct family of eurypterids that lived in the Silurian and Devonian periods.

== Description ==
Dolichopterid eurypterids had outer surfaces that were either smooth or with pustules and semilunar scales. The compound eyes were arcuate and located anteriorly on the prosoma (head). The abdomens had epimers (lateral projections). The telson (the posteriormost division of the body) was lanceolate. The chelicerae were small, and the first three pairs of walking legs were stout, with powerful spines. The last pair of walking legs had supplementary lobes, while the swimming legs had the last joint enlarged, as part of the paddle. The male genital appendage was long.

== See also ==
- List of eurypterids
