= Pentlandopterus =

Pentlandopterus Temporal range: Late Ordovician

Scientific classification
- Kingdom: Animalia
- Phylum: Arthropoda
- Subphylum: Chelicerata
- Order: †Eurypterida
- Superfamily: †Dolichopteroidea
- Family: †Dolichopteridae
- Genus: †Pentlandopterus; Lamsdell, Hoşgör & Selden, 2013

Type species
- †Pentlandopterus minor Laurie, 1899

Extinct genus of sea scorpions

Pentlandopterus is a genus of prehistoric eurypterid from the Late Ordovician period. The genus contains one species, P. minor, known from the Pentland Hills in Scotland. Pentlandopterus is classified as part of the family Dolichopteridae.

== See also ==
- List of eurypterids
