= List of the Paleozoic life of Pennsylvania =

This list of the Paleozoic life of Pennsylvania contains the various prehistoric life-forms whose fossilized remains have been reported from within the US state of Pennsylvania and are between 538.8 and 252.17 million years of age.

== A ==
- †Acanthopecten
  - †Acanthopecten carboniferous
- †Acidaspis
  - †Acidaspis cincinnatiensis
- †Acrothele
  - †Acrothele decipiens
  - †Acrothele yorkensis
- †Acrotreta
- †Actinomylacris
  - †Actinomylacris similis – type locality for species
- †Actinopteria
  - †Actinopteria boydi
  - †Actinopteria boydii
  - †Actinopteria decussata
- †Adelphobolbina
  - †Adelphobolbina medialis
- †Adiantites
  - †Adiantites mirabilis
  - †Adiantites spectabilis – type locality for species
  - †Adiantites ungeri – type locality for species
- †Adiatites
  - †Adiatites cyclopteroides – type locality for species
  - †Adiatites spectabilis – type locality for species
- †Aechmina
- †Agassizocrinus
- †Ageleodus
  - †Ageleodus pectinatus
- †Aglaoglypta
  - †Aglaoglypta maera
  - †Aglaoglypta nactoides
- †Agnostus
- †Alcicornopteris
  - †Alcicornopteris altoonensis – type locality for species
  - †Alcicornopteris anthracitica – type locality for species
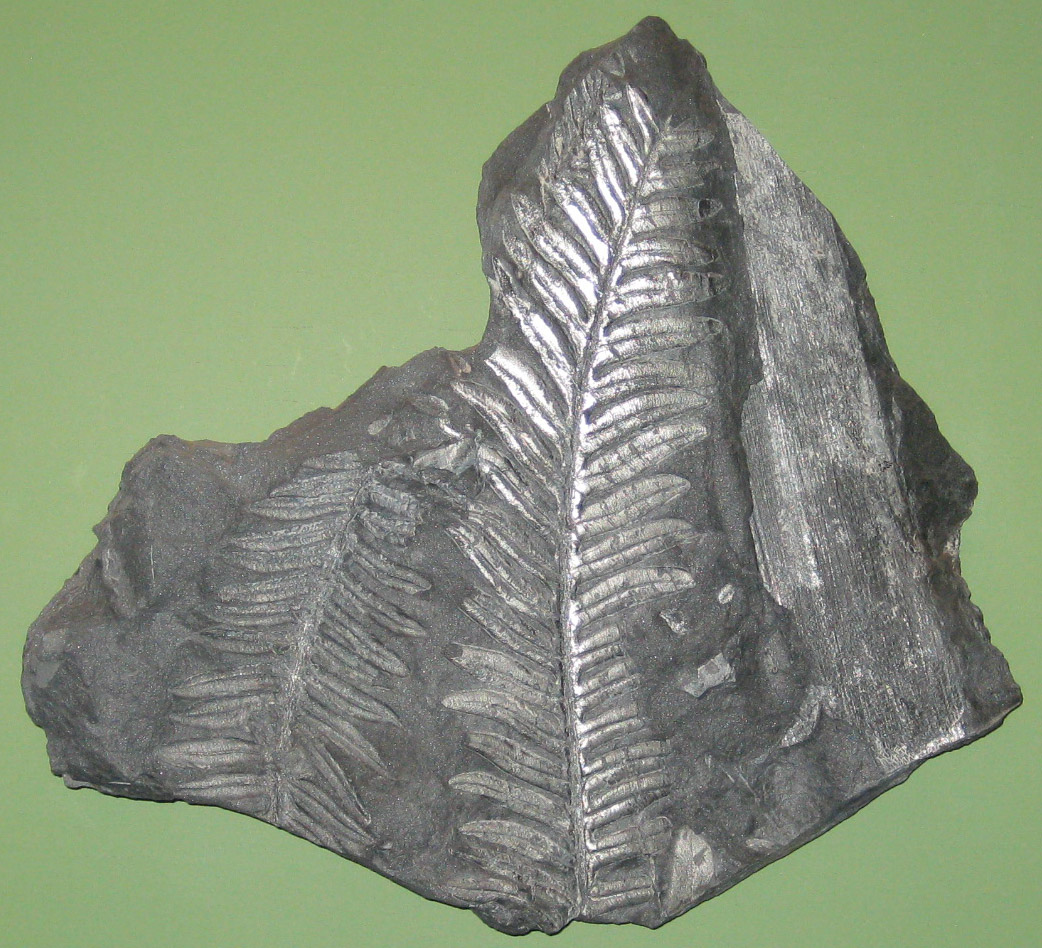
- Fossilized fronds of the Carboniferous-Early Cretaceous seed fern Alethopteris
  †Alethopteris
  - †Alethopteris densinervosa
  - †Alethopteris ingbertensis
  - †Alethopteris lonchitifolia
  - †Alethopteris missouriensis
  - †Alethopteris serli
  - †Alethopteris westphalensis
- †Allanella
  - †Allanella tullius
- †Alokistocare
  - †Alokistocare aoris – type locality for species
  - †Alokistocare nasutum – type locality for species
- †Ambocoelia
  - †Ambocoelia gregaria
  - †Ambocoelia umbonata
- †Amboneura – type locality for genus
  - †Amboneura klosei – type locality for species
- †Americaspis
- †Amphiscapha
  - †Amphiscapha catilloides
- †Amphissites
- †Anastomopora
- †Ancyrospora
- †Aneurospora
  - †Aneurospora greggsii
- †Anisotrypa
- †Ankoura
  - †Ankoura apicalis
  - †Ankoura orbiculata – or unidentified comparable form
  - †Ankoura sublettensis
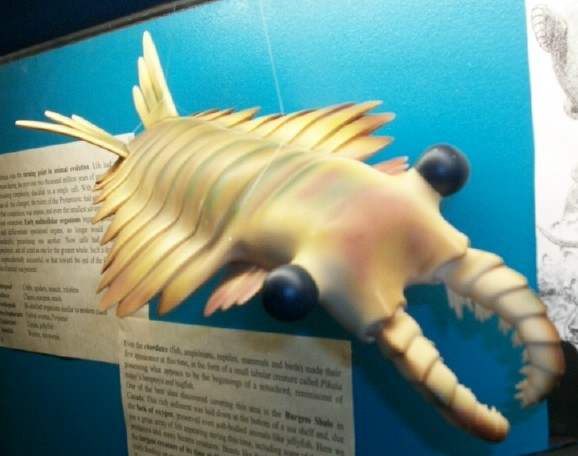
- Restorative model of the Cambrian arthropod Anomalocaris
  †Anomalocaris
  - †Anomalocaris lineata
- †Anomomylacris – type locality for genus
  - †Anomomylacris cubitalis – type locality for species
- †Anoplea
  - †Anoplea nucleata
- †Anoplotheca
- †Anthracospirifer
- †Aparchites
  - †Aparchites subrotunda
- †Aphthoroblattina
  - †Aphthoroblattina fascigera – type locality for species
- †Aphyllum
  - †Aphyllum fascicularium
- †Archaeopteridium
  - †Archaeopteridium bellasylviana – type locality for species
- †Archaeopteris
  - †Archaeopteris halliana
  - †Archaeopteris latifolia
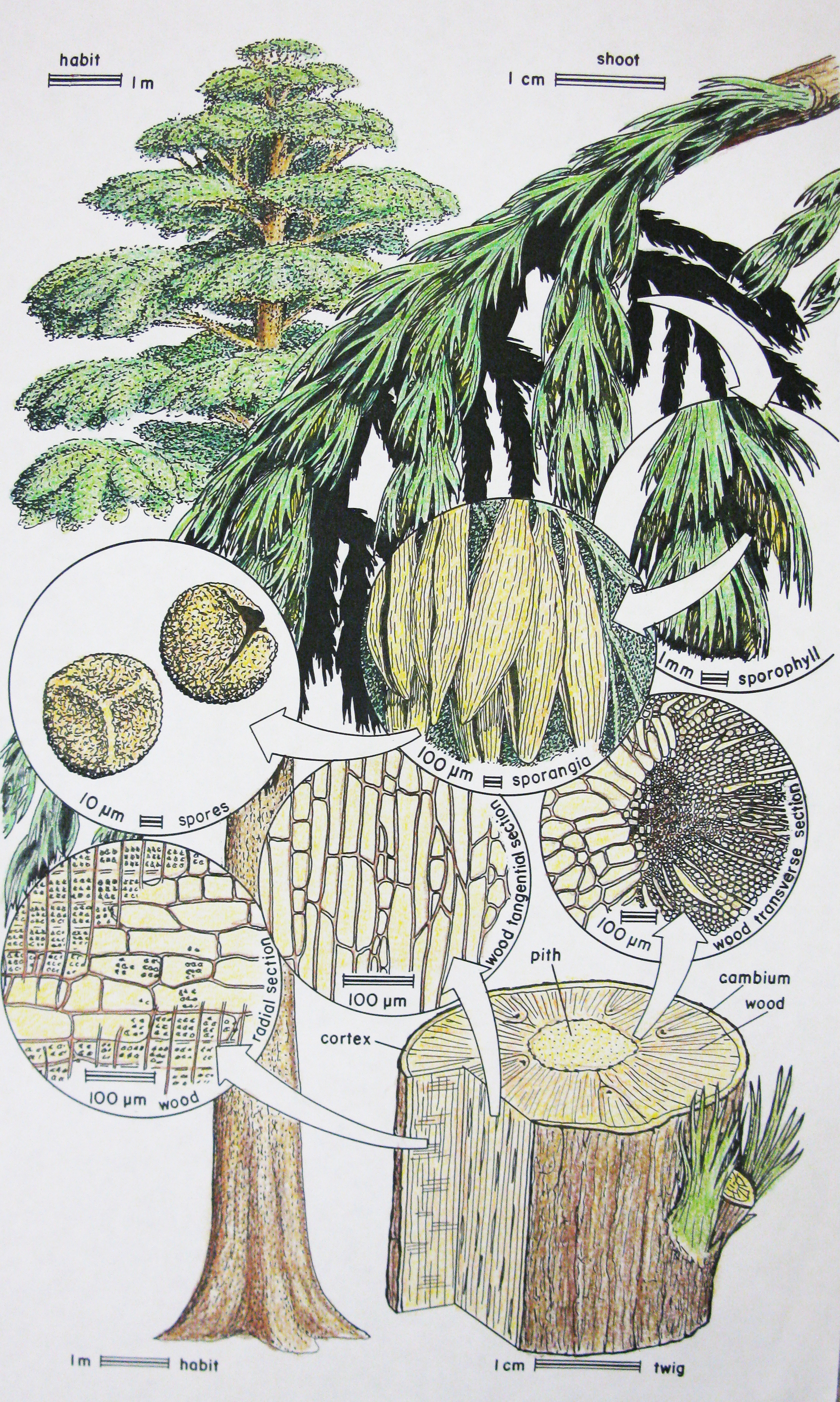
  - Life restoration of the Late Devonian-Carboniferous tree Archaeopteris macilenta with insets detailing its anatomy
    †Archaeopteris macilenta
  - †Archaeopteris minor
  - †Archaeopteris roemeriana – or unidentified comparable form
  - †Archaeopteris rogersi
- †Archaeosperma
  - †Archaeosperma arnoldii
- †Archaeotriletes
  - †Archaeotriletes senticosus
- †Archeopteris
  - †Archeopteris latifolia
- †Archimylacris
  - †Archimylacris parallelum
- †Archinacella
- †Armathyraster
  - †Armathyraster paradoxis
- †Arthrophycus
- †Articulatae
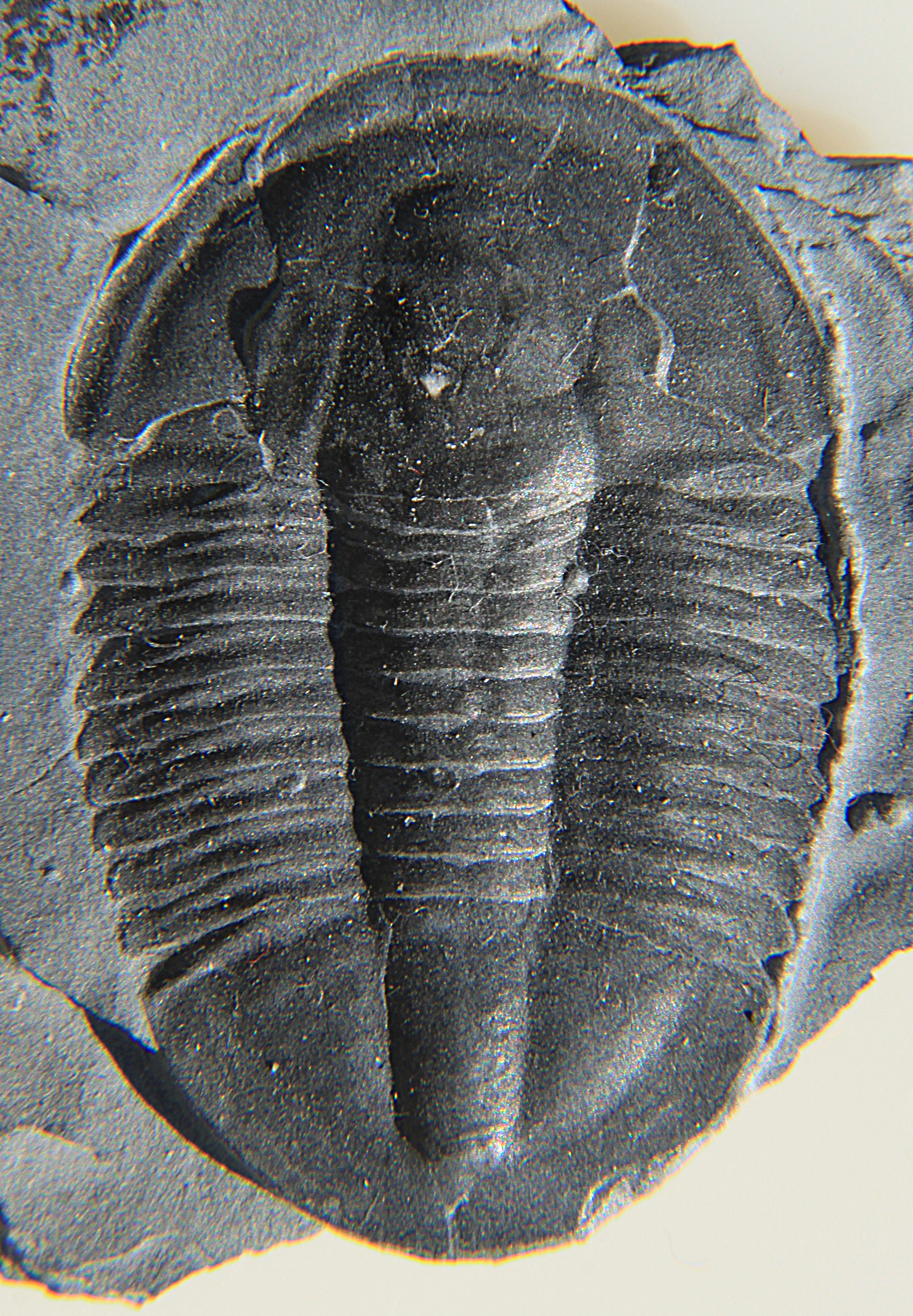
- Fossil of the Cambrian trilobite Asaphiscus
  †Asaphiscus
  - †Asaphiscus glaber
- †Asemoblatta – type locality for genus
  - †Asemoblatta pennsylvanica – type locality for species
- †Astartella
  - †Astartella vera
- †Atalotaenia – type locality for genus
  - †Atalotaenia adela – type locality for species
- †Ateleocystites
  - †Ateleocystites huxleyi
- †Athyris
  - †Athyris angelica
  - †Athyris spiriferiodes
  - †Athyris spiriferoides
- †Atimoblatta – type locality for genus
  - †Atimoblatta curvipennis – type locality for species
  - †Atimoblatta flexuosa – type locality for species
  - †Atimoblatta reducta – type locality for species
- †Atlanticocoelia
  - †Atlanticocoelia acutiplicata
- †Atrypa
  - †Atrypa recticularis
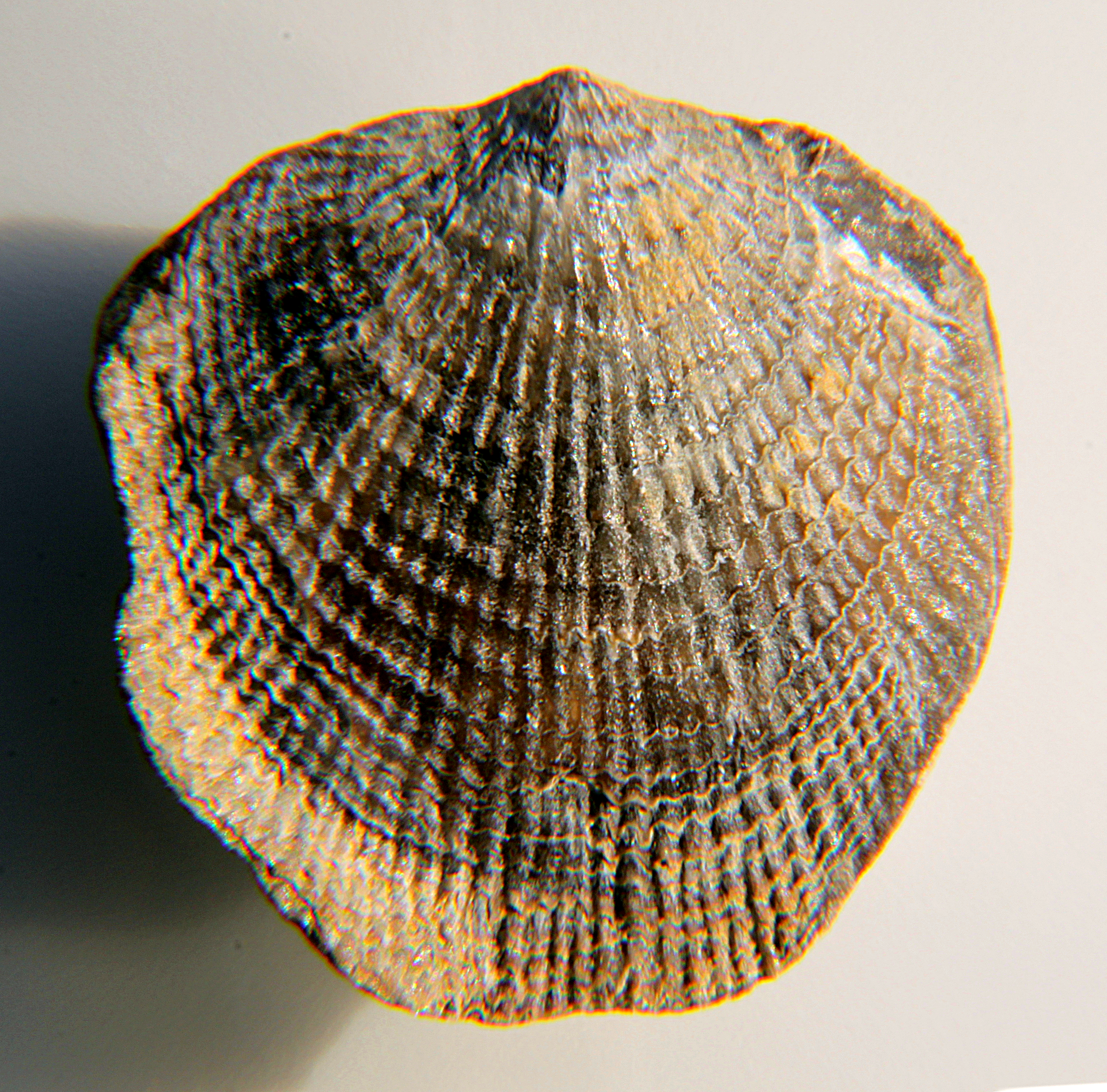
  - Fossilized shell of the Silurian-Late Devonian brachiopod Atrypa reticularis
    †Atrypa reticularis
- †Aulocystis
- †Auroraspora
  - †Auroraspora hyalina
  - †Auroraspora macra
  - †Auroraspora solisorta
  - †Auroraspora torquata
- †Aviculopecten
  - †Aviculopecten bellus
  - †Aviculopecten equilatera
  - †Aviculopecten occidentalis

== B ==
- †Bactrites
- †Barbclabornia
  - †Barbclabornia luedersensis
- †Barinophyton
  - †Barinophyton citrulliforme
  - †Barinophyton obscurum
- †Bathyuriscus
- †Batostoma
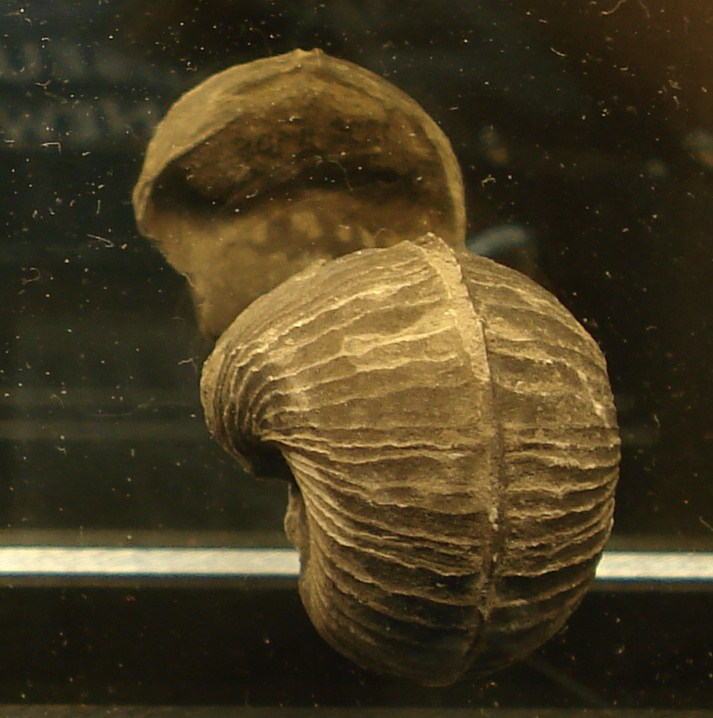
- Fossilized shell of the Silurian-Early Triassic mollusc Bellerophon
  †Bellerophon
  - †Bellerophon clarki
  - †Bellerophon nactus
- †Bembexia
  - †Bembexia laevis
- Berenicea
- †Beyrichoceratoides
  - †Beyrichoceratoides lunatus
- †Bisporangiostrobus
  - †Bisporangiostrobus harrisii
- †Blainia
  - †Blainia buttsi – type locality for species
- †Blairella
  - †Blairella triangularis – type locality for species
- †Blattoidea
  - †Blattoidea schucherti – type locality for species
- †Blountia
  - †Blountia prolifica – type locality for species
  - †Blountia waddlensis
  - †Blountia warriorensis – type locality for species
- †Bollia
  - †Bollia hama
  - †Bollia hindei
  - †Bollia planofibra
  - †Bollia spinomuralis
  - †Bollia ungula
- †Bolllia
  - †Bolllia ungula
- †Bonneterrina
  - †Bonneterrina aspinosa – type locality for species
- †Bonnia
  - †Bonnia bubaris
  - †Bonnia capito
  - †Bonnia senecta – tentative report
- †Bonniella
  - †Bonniella yorkensis
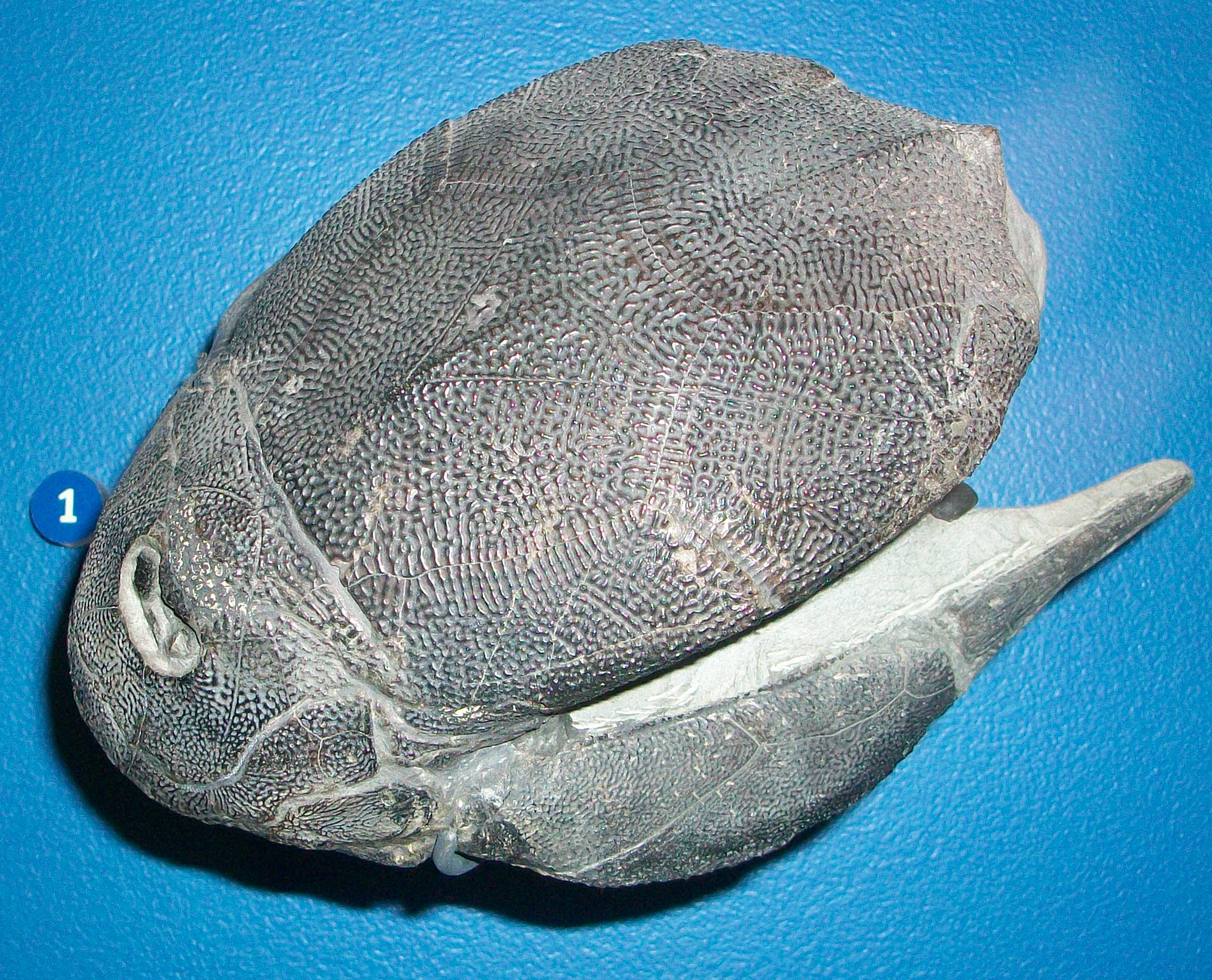
- Fossilized bony armor of the Late Devonian placoderm fish Bothriolepis
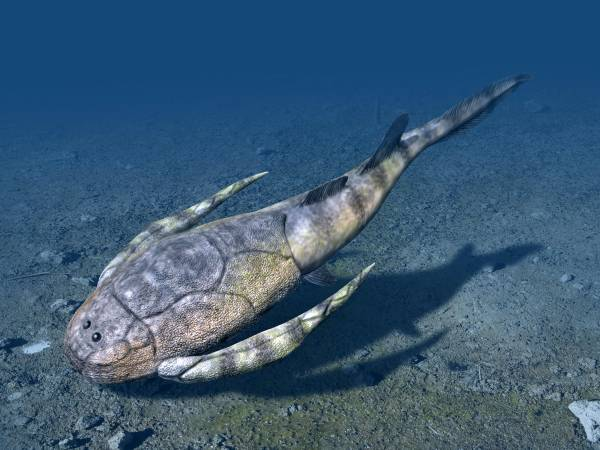
  Life restoration of the Late Devonian placoderm fish Bothriolepis
  †Bothriolepis
  - †Bothriolepis nitida
  - †Bothriolepis nitidus
- †Brachycycloceras
  - †Brachycycloceras curtum
- †Brachymylacris
  - †Brachymylacris bassleri – type locality for species
  - †Brachymylacris elongata – type locality for species
  - †Brachymylacris rotundata – type locality for species
- †Bucanopsis
- †Bufina
  - †Bufina bicornuta
- †Burnetiella
  - †Burnetiella ectypa
  - †Burnetiella urania
- †Buttisia
  - †Buttisia drabensis
- †Buttsia
  - †Buttsia completa
  - †Buttsia drabensis
- †Bynumia
  - †Bynumia terrenda
- †Bynumina
  - †Bynumina terrenda
  - †Bynumina type locality for species – informal
- †Bynuminia
  - †Bynuminia terrenda
- †Byronia
- †Byssonychia – tentative report
  - †Byssonychia vera – or unidentified comparable form
- Bythocypris

== C ==
- †Calathiops
  - †Calathiops pottsvillensis – type locality for species
- †Calathospongia
  - †Calathospongia carceralis
  - †Calathospongia carlli
  - †Calathospongia tidioutensis
- †Callixylon
- †Caloneurella – type locality for genus
  - †Caloneurella carbonaria – type locality for species
- †Calvibembexia
  - †Calvibembexia sulcomarginata
- †Camaraspis
  - †Camaraspis convexa
- †Camarotoechia
  - †Camarotoechia constricta
  - †Camarotoechia prolifica
  - †Camarotoechia saxatilis
- †Camerella
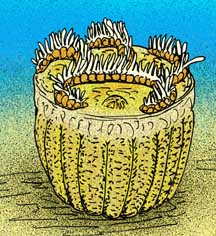
- Life restoration of the Cambrian echinoderm Camptostroma
  †Camptostroma
  - †Camptostroma roddyi
- †Cardiocarpon
  - †Cardiocarpon phillipsi – type locality for species
- †Cariniferella
  - †Cariniferella carinata
  - †Cariniferella tioga
- †Carydium
  - †Carydium bellastriatum
- †Cavellina
  - †Cavellina planoprocliva
- †Cavusgnathus
- †Centronella
- †Ceramopora
  - †Ceramopora incondita
- †Ceratopsis
  - †Ceratopsis chambersi
- †Ceriocrinus
- †Chalepomylacris – type locality for genus
  - †Chalepomylacris pulchra – type locality for species
- †Chancelloria
  - †Chancelloria yorkensis
- †Chancia
- †Cheilocephalus
  - †Cheilocephalus quadratus – type locality for species
- †Chonetes
  - †Chonetes buttsi
  - †Chonetes hemisphericus
- †Chonetinella
  - †Chonetinella verneuilana
- †Cincinnaticrinus
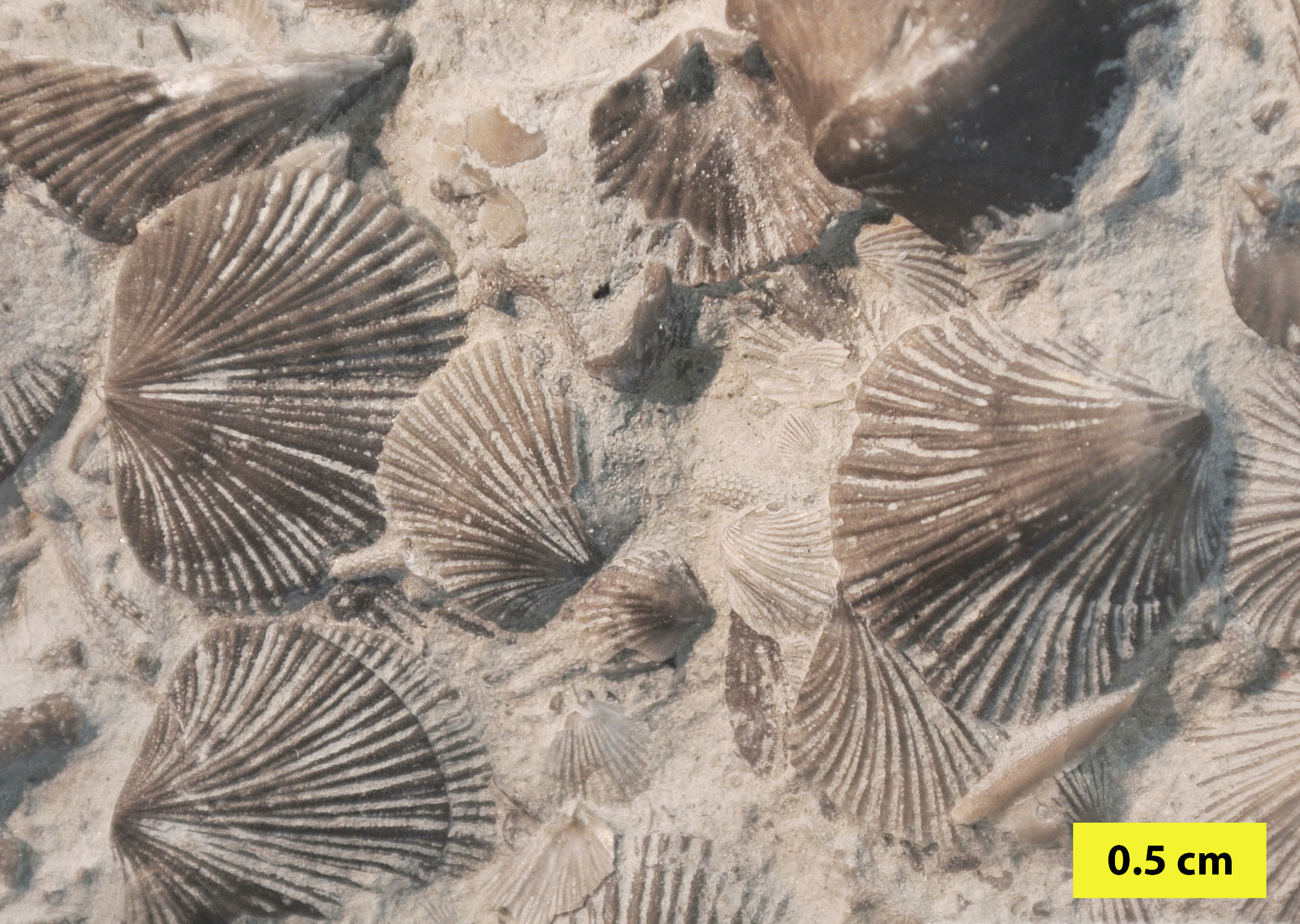
- Assemblage of fossilized shells of the Ordovician brachiopod Cincinnetina
  †Cincinnetina
  - †Cincinnetina multisecta
- †Cladopora
  - †Cladopora seriata
- †Cleiothyridina
- †Cliffia
  - †Cliffia lataegenae
  - †Cliffia latagenae
- †Climacograptus
  - †Climacograptus typicalis
- †Cobaloblatta – type locality for genus
  - †Cobaloblatta simulans – type locality for species
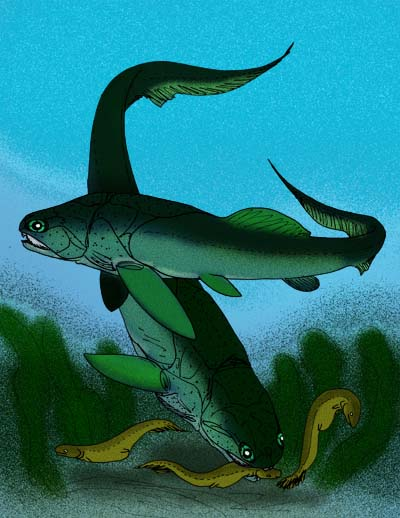
- Coccosteus cuspidatus restoration, shown attacking multiple Palaeospondylus'
  †Coccosteus
  - †Coccosteus macromus – type locality for species
- †Coelacanthus
- †Coleolus
- †Colpodexylon
  - †Colpodexylon deatsii
- †Colpomya
  - †Colpomya faba
- †Comanchia
  - †Comanchia amplooculata
- †Composita
  - †Composita subtilita
- †Conaspis
- †Conotheca
  - †Conotheca australiensis – or unidentified comparable form
- †Conularia
  - †Conularia trentonensis – tentative report
- †Convolutispora
  - †Convolutispora opressa – or unidentified comparable form
- †Coosella
  - †Coosella convexa – type locality for species
  - †Coosella vulgaris – type locality for species
- †Coosia
  - †Coosia pustulata – type locality for species
- †Corbulispora
  - †Corbulispora cancellata
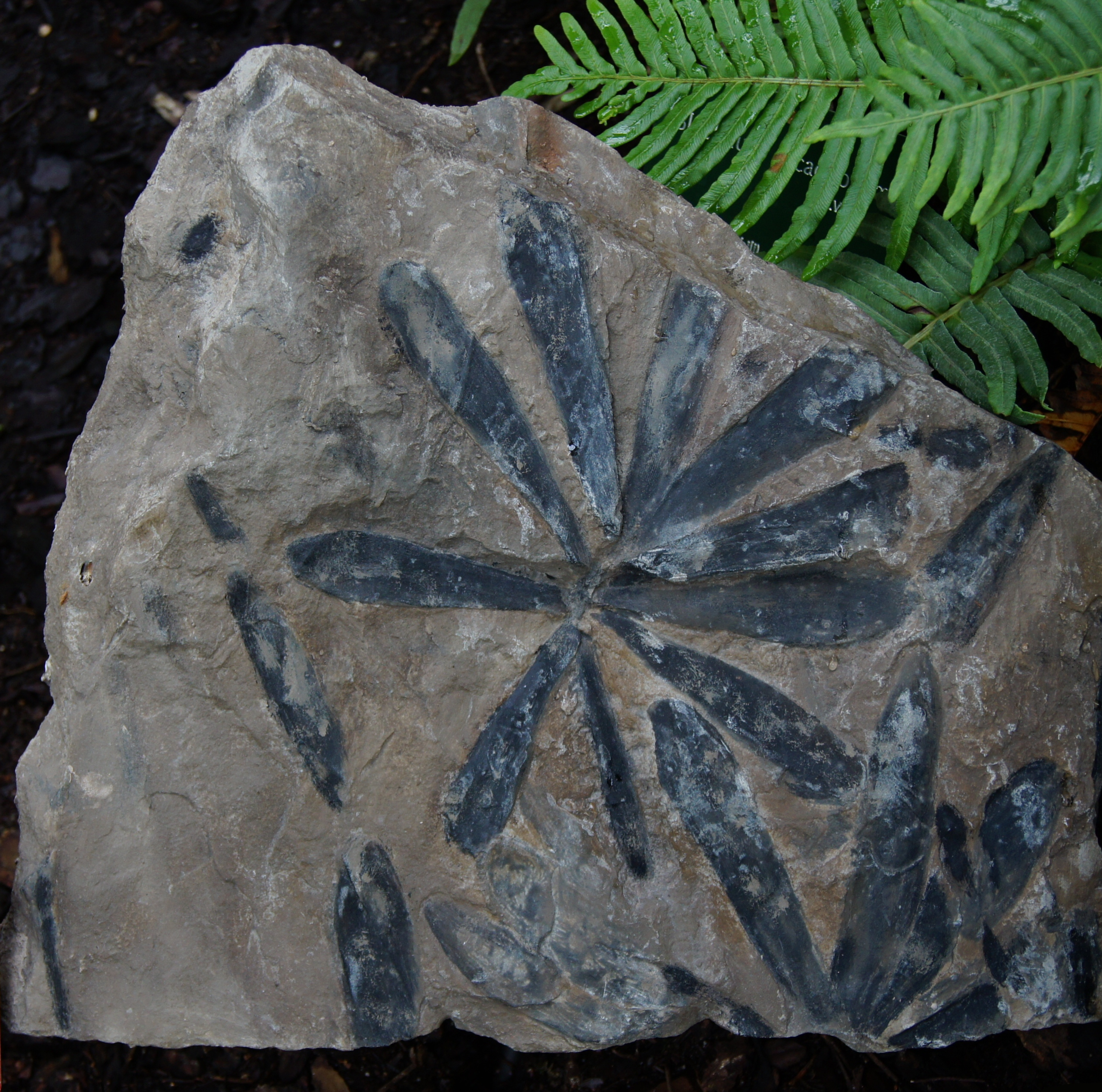
- Fossilized foliage of the Carboniferous-Permian conifer relative Cordaites
  †Cordaites
- †Cornellites
  - †Cornellites flabella
- †Cornulites
  - †Cornulites flexuosus
  - †Cornulites progressus – or unidentified comparable form
- †Corticospongia – type locality for genus
  - †Corticospongia bradfordensis – type locality for species
- †Cranaena
- †Craniops
  - †Craniops hamiltoniae
  - †Craniops subtruncata
- †Crenistriella
  - †Crenistriella crenistria
- †Crepicephalus
- †Crurithyris
  - †Crurithyris planoconvexa
- †Cryptolithus
  - †Cryptolithus bellulus
  - †Cryptolithus recurvus
- †Cryptozoon
  - †Cryptozoon undulatum
- †Ctenerpeton – type locality for genus
  - †Ctenerpeton remex – type locality for species
- †Ctenoloculina
  - †Ctenoloculina cicatricosa
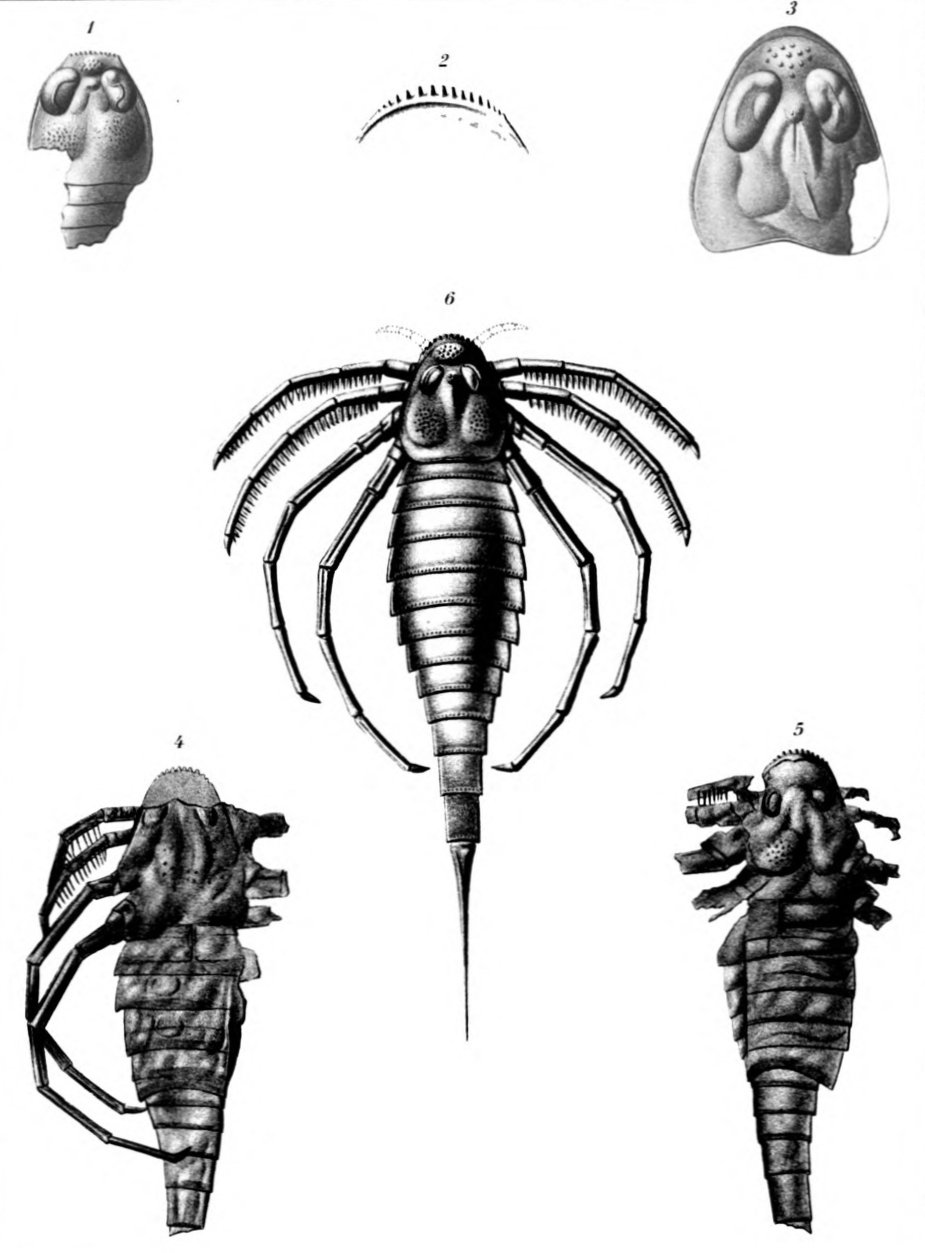
- Fossils and life restoration of the Silurian eurypterid ("sea scorpion") Ctenopterus
  †Ctenopterus
  - †Ctenopterus cestrotus
- †Cuneamya
- †Cupularostrum
  - †Cupularostrum congregata
  - †Cupularostrum contracta
  - †Cupularostrum exima
  - †Cupularostrum orbicularis
- †Cyclonema
- †Cyclopteris
- †Cymatospira
  - †Cymatospira montfortianus
- †Cypricardella
  - †Cypricardella bellastriata
  - †Cypricardella bellistriata
  - †Cypricardella tenuistriata
- †Cypricardina
  - †Cypricardina indenta
- †Cypricardinia
  - †Cypricardinia indenta
- †Cyrtina
  - †Cyrtina hamiltonensis
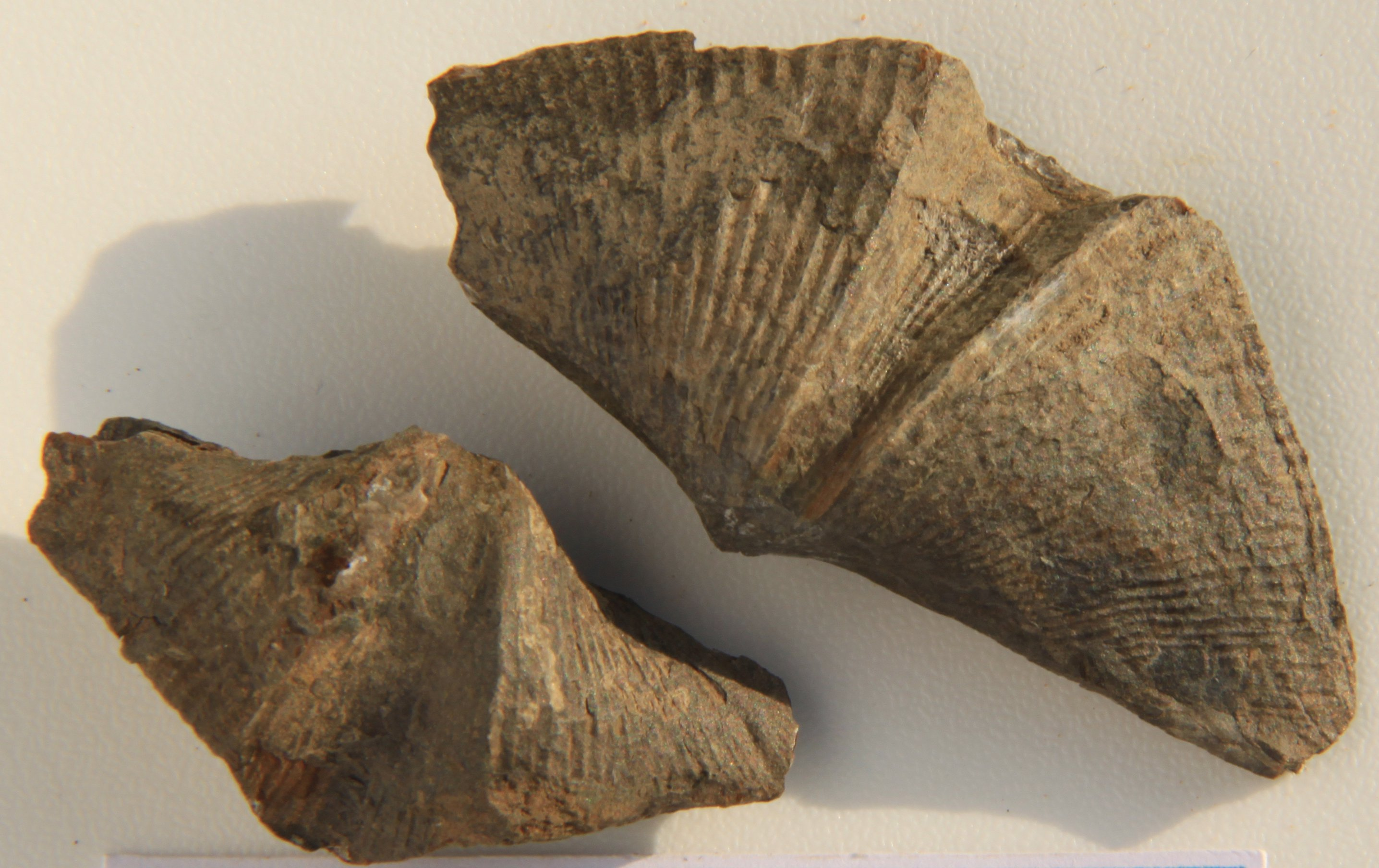
- Fossilized shells of the Middle-Late Devonian brachiopod Cyrtospirifer
  †Cyrtospirifer
  - †Cyrtospirifer disjunctus
- †Cyrtospora
  - †Cyrtospora cristifera – or unidentified comparable form
- †Cystihalysites

== D ==
- †Dawsonia
  - †Dawsonia parkeri
- †Deadwoodia
  - †Deadwoodia duris
- †Dechenella
- †Deckera
  - †Deckera completa
- †Dekayella
- †Dellea
  - †Dellea glabellamersa
  - †Dellea rogersi – type locality for species
  - †Dellea saratogensis
- †Delthyris
- †Deltodus
  - †Deltodus angularis
- †Densignathus – type locality for genus
  - †Densignathus rowei – type locality for species
- †Derbyia
  - †Derbyia crassa
  - †Derbyia robusta
- †Devonochonetes
  - †Devonochonetes coronatus
  - †Devonochonetes scitulus
  - †Devonochonetes syrtalis
- †Diacanthaspis
- †Diaphanospora
- †Diaphragmus
- †Dictyomylacris
- †Dictyotomaria
  - †Dictyotomaria capillaria
- †Dictyotriletes
  - †Dictyotriletes nefandus
- †Dieconeurites – type locality for genus
  - †Dieconeurites rigidus – type locality for species
- †Diplocaulus – or unidentified comparable form
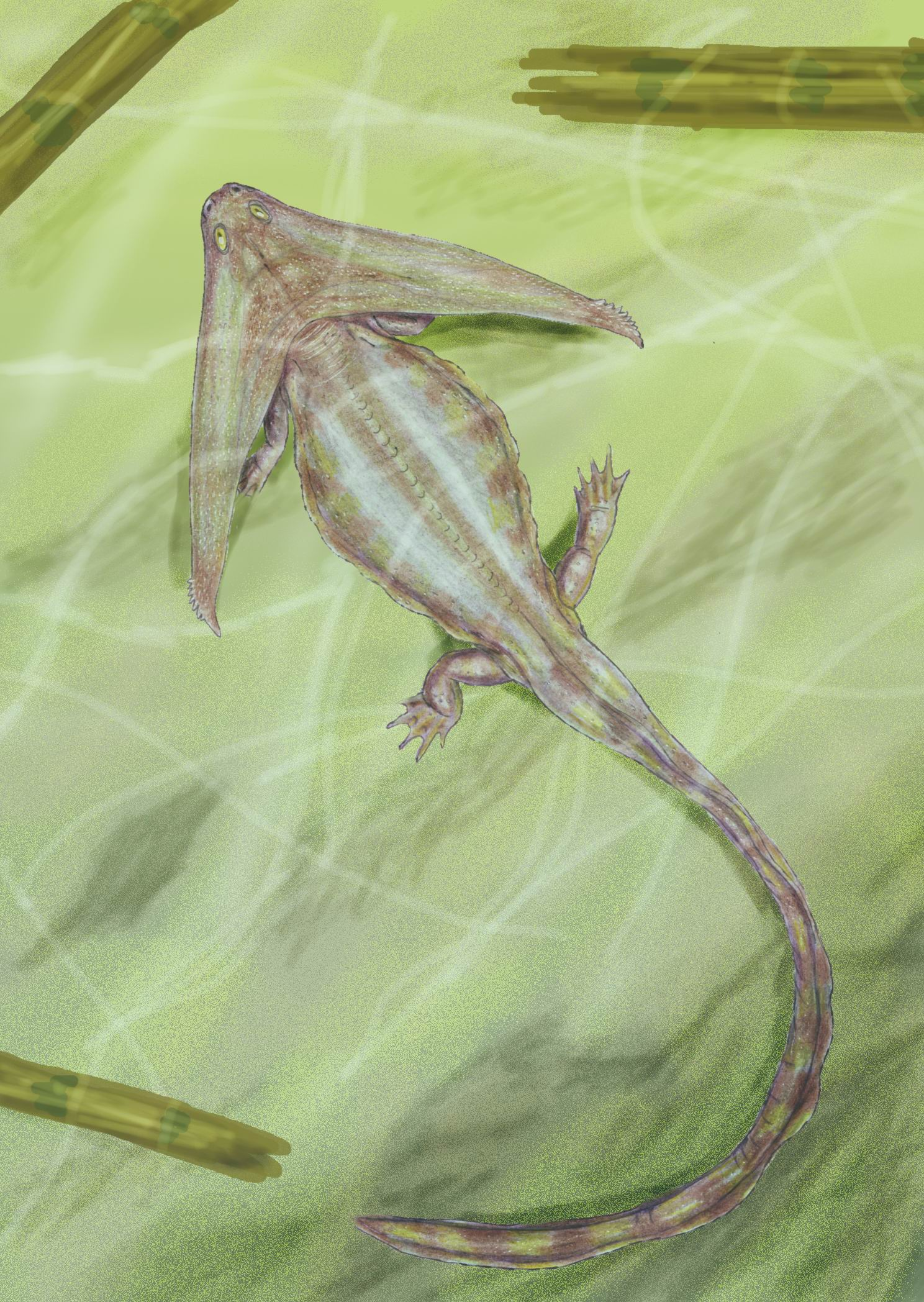
- Life restoration of the Permian amphibian Diploceraspis
  †Diploceraspis
  - †Diploceraspis burkei
- †Diplograptus
  - †Diplograptus nexus
- †Ditomopyge
  - †Ditomopyge scitulus
- †Dizygopleura
- †Dodecaactinella
  - †Dodecaactinella spicules
- †Dokimocephalus – tentative report
  - †Dokimocephalus intermedius
- †Douvillina
  - †Douvillina cayuta
  - †Douvillina inaequistriata
- †Drabia
  - †Drabia acroccipita
  - †Drabia acrocclpita
  - †Drabia acrocclptia
  - †Drabia menusa
  - †Drabia typica
- †Dunbarella
  - †Dunbarella striata

== E ==
- †Echinoconchus
  - †Echinoconchus punctatus
- †Ectenocrinus
  - †Ectenocrinus simplex
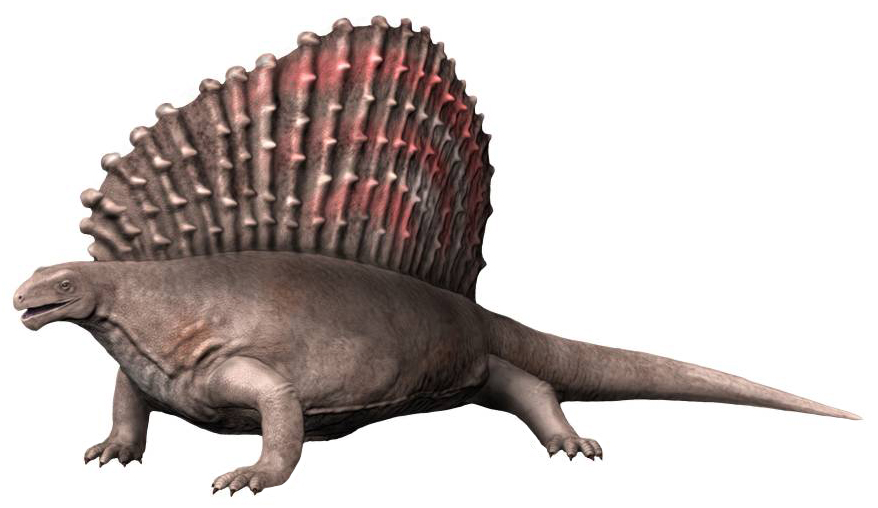
- Life restoration of the Permian synapsid (mammal precursor) Edaphosaurus
  †Edaphosaurus
  - †Edaphosaurus raymondi – type locality for species
- †Edmondia
- †Eldredgeops
  - †Eldredgeops rana
- †Elita
  - †Elita fimbriata
- †Elrathia
  - †Elrathia grazierensis – type locality for species
- †Elrathina
- †Elvinia
  - †Elvinia roemeri
- †Embolophyllum
  - †Embolophyllum clarki
  - †Embolophyllum coralliferum
  - †Embolophyllum schucherti
- †Emmanuella
  - †Emmanuella subumbona
- †Emphanisporites
  - †Emphanisporites annulatus – or unidentified comparable form
  - †Emphanisporites pantagiatus – or unidentified comparable form
  - †Emphanisporites rotatus
- †Endolobus
- †Endothyra
- †Endothyranella
  - †Endothyranella nitida – or unidentified comparable form
  - †Endothyranella stormi – or unidentified comparable form
- †Entellophylloides
  - †Entellophylloides inequalils
- †Eoagnostus
  - †Eoagnostus roddyi
- †Eoobolus
  - †Eoobolus priscus
- †Eoorthis
  - †Eoorthis indianola
- †Eoserpeton
  - †Eoserpeton tenuicorne – type locality for species
- †Eothele
  - †Eothele tubulus
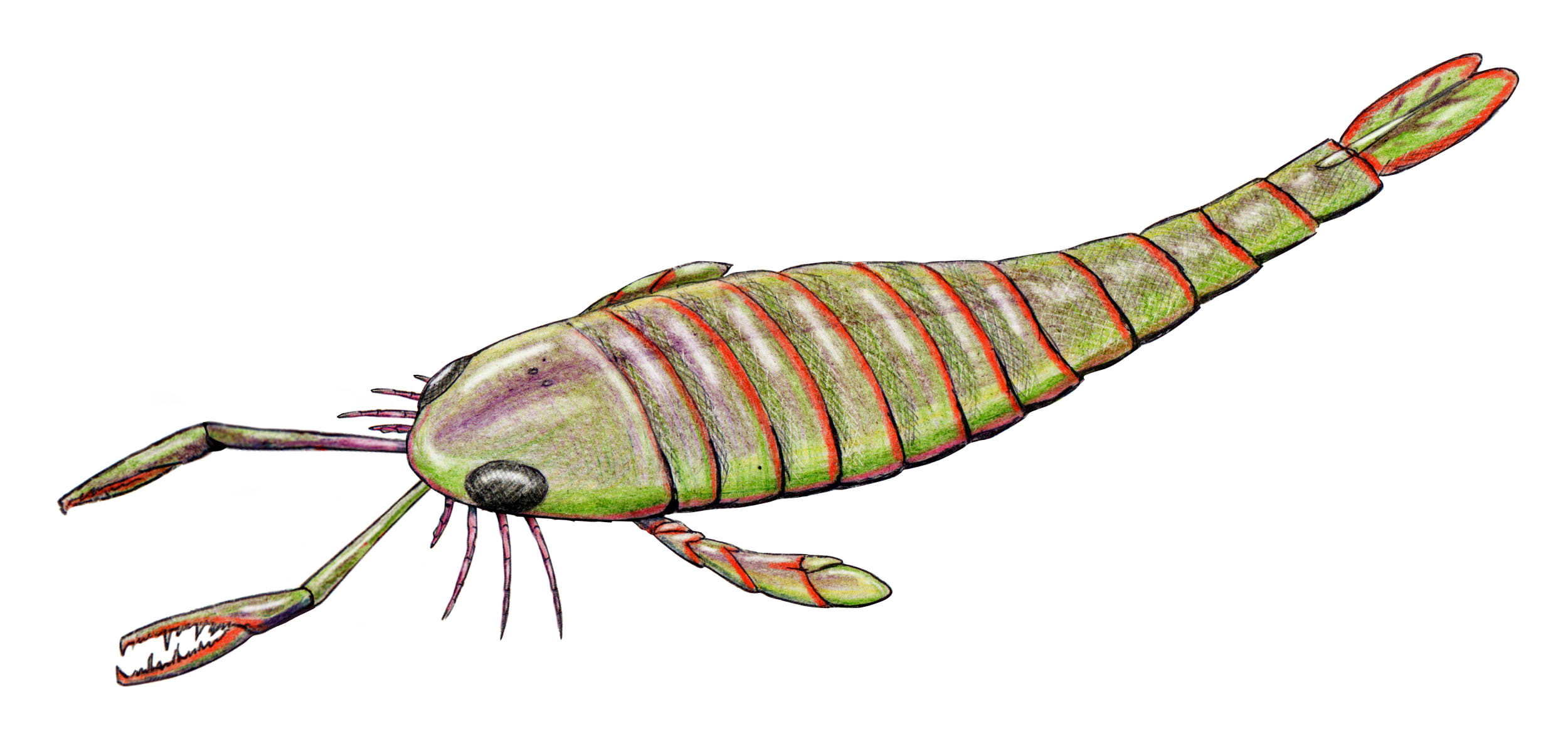
- Life restoration of the Silurian-Early Devonian eurypterid ("sea scorpion") Erettopterus
  †Erettopterus
  - †Erettopterus globiceps
- †Eryops
  - †Eryops avinoffi
- †Eshelmania
- †Esmeraldina
  - †Esmeraldina macer
- †Euglyphella
  - †Euglyphella numismoides
- †Eukloedenella
- †Eumetria
- †Euomphalus
- †Eupachycrinus
- †Euphemites
  - †Euphemites carbonarius

== F ==
- †Fabreciella – type locality for genus
  - †Fabreciella pennsylvanica – type locality for species
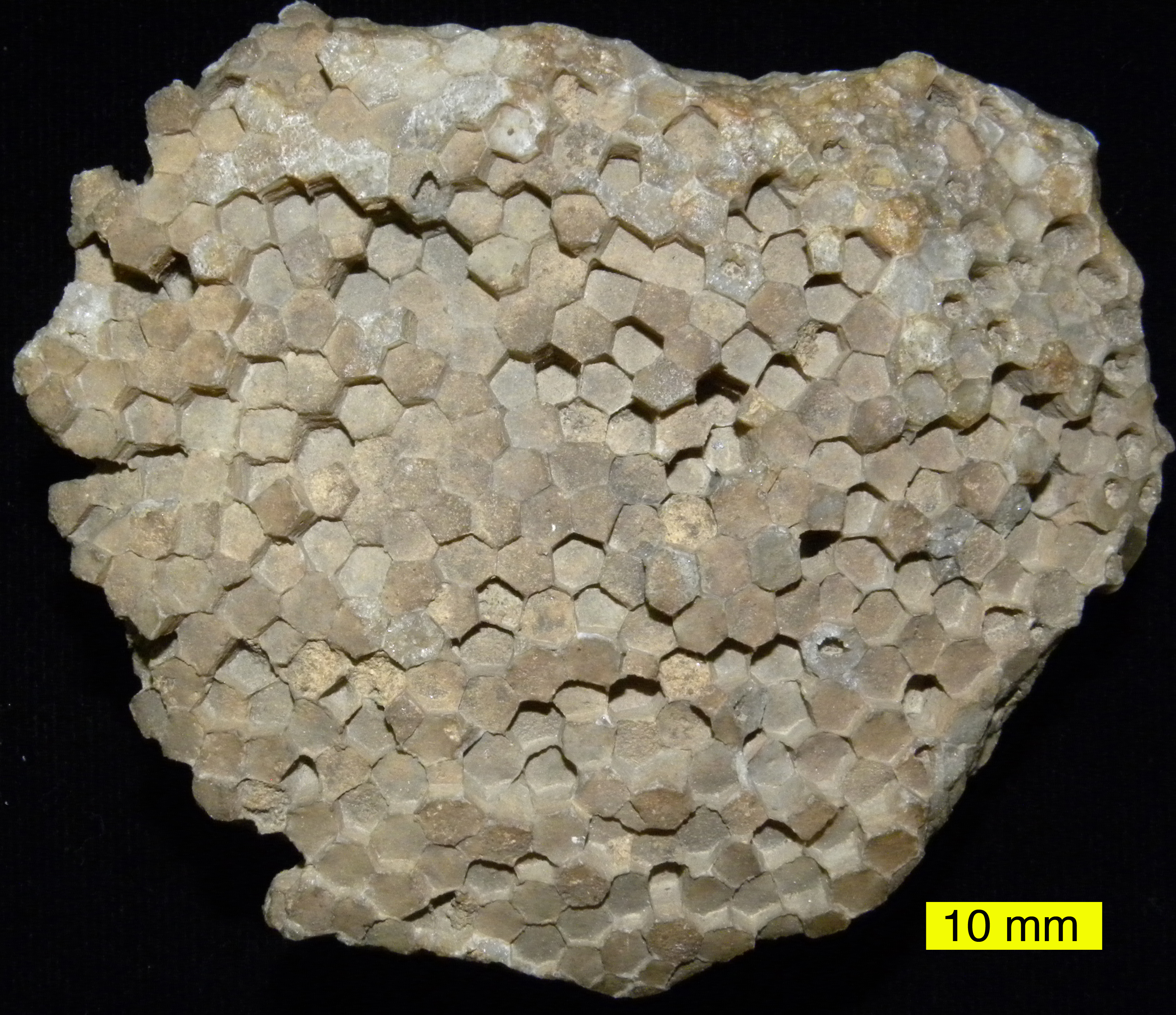
- Fossil of the Late Ordovician-Permian tabulate coral Favosites
  †Favosites
  - †Favosites niagarensis
- †Fedexia
- †Fenestella
  - †Fenestella emaciata
  - †Fenestella sinuosa
- †Fimbrispirifer
- †Finkelnburgia
  - †Finkelnburgia bridgei – or unidentified comparable form
- †Fistuliporella
  - †Fistuliporella minima
- †Fletcherina
  - †Fletcherina incognita – or unidentified comparable form
- †Floweria
  - †Floweria chemungensis

== G ==
- †Ganorhynchus
  - †Ganorhynchus oblongus – type locality for species
- †Geminospora
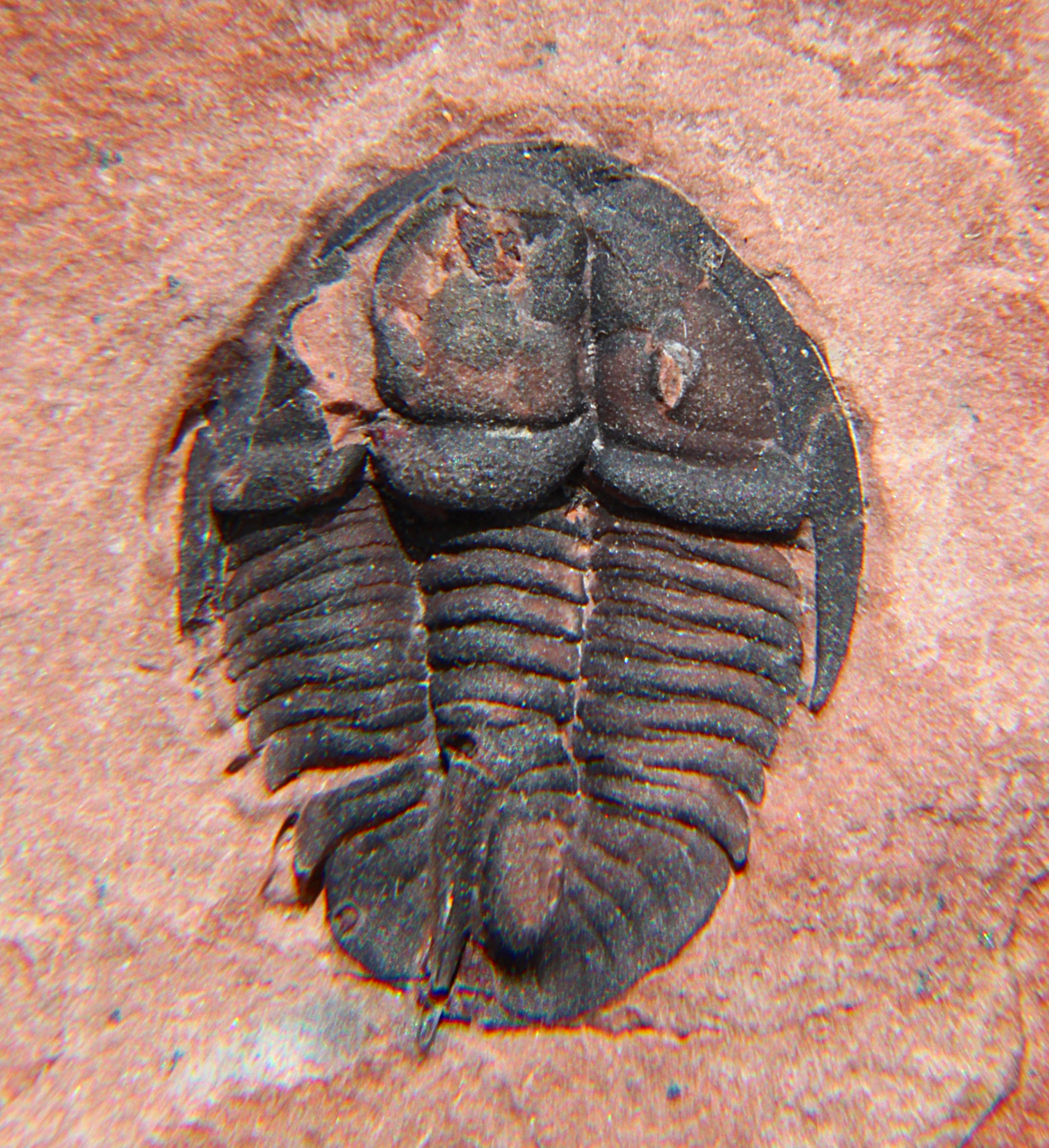
- Fossil of the Cambrian trilobite Genevievella
  †Genevievella
  - †Genevievella campbellina – type locality for species
  - †Genevievella pennstatensis – type locality for species
  - †Genevievella plesiochielus – type locality for species
- †Gigantocharinus – type locality for genus
  - †Gigantocharinus szatmaryi – type locality for species
- †Girtya
  - †Girtya pennslvanica
  - †Girtya pennsylvanica – type locality for species
- †Glabrocingulum
  - †Glabrocingulum grayvillense
- †Glaphyraspis
  - †Glaphyraspis ovata
- †Glaukerpeton – type locality for genus
  - †Glaukerpeton avinoffi – type locality for species
- †Glyptocrinus
- †Glyptodesma
  - †Glyptodesma erectum – tentative report
- †Gnathodus
- †Goniomylacris – type locality for genus
  - †Goniomylacris pauper – type locality for species
- †Goniophora
  - †Goniophora hamiltonensis
- †Grandispora
  - †Grandispora cornuta
  - †Grandispora upensis
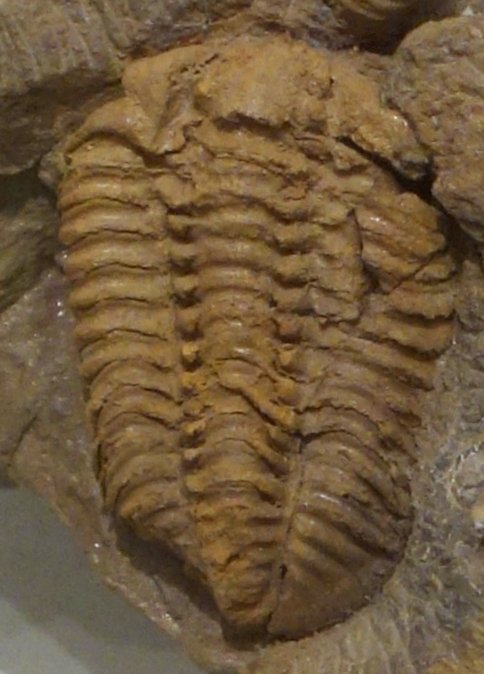
- Fossils of the Middle Ordovician-Early Devonian trilobite Gravicalymene
  †Gravicalymene
- †Greenops
  - †Greenops boothi

== H ==
- †Hadrotreta
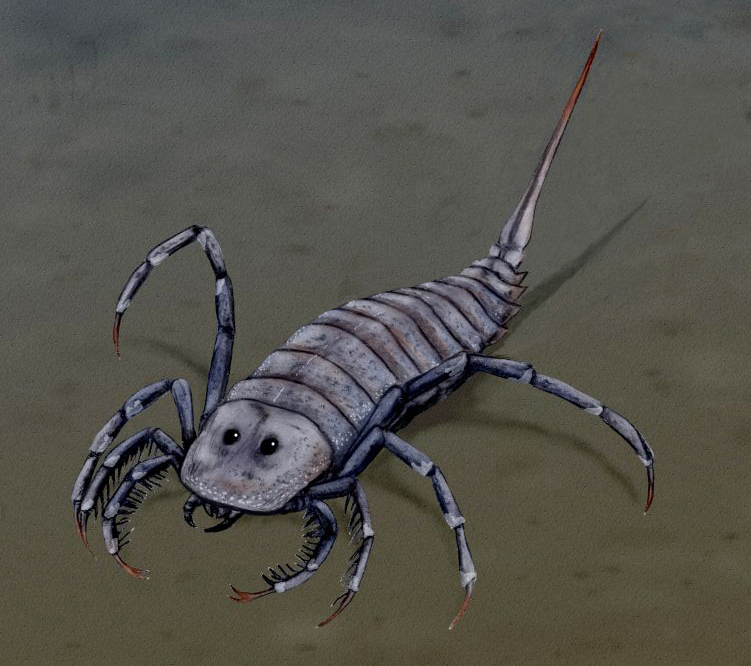
- Life restoration of the Late Devonian eurypterid ("sea scorpion") Hallipterus
  †Hallipterus
  - †Hallipterus lacoanus
- †Hapaloptera – type locality for genus
  - †Hapaloptera gracilis – type locality for species
- †Hardieopterus
  - †Hardieopterus myops
- †Hazelia
  - †Hazelia walcotti
- †Healdia
- †Helcionella
- †Hemimylacrella
  - †Hemimylacrella mammothi – type locality for species
- †Hemimylacris
  - †Hemimylacris ramificata – type locality for species
- †Herrmannina
- †Heslerodus
  - †Heslerodus divergens
- †Hexactinellid
  - †Hexactinellid spicules
- †Hibbardella
- †Hibbardia
  - †Hibbardia lacrimosa
- †Hindeodus
- †Holcacephalus
  - †Holcacephalus tunda
- †Hollinella
  - †Hollinella sella – or unidentified comparable form
  - †Hollinella tricollina
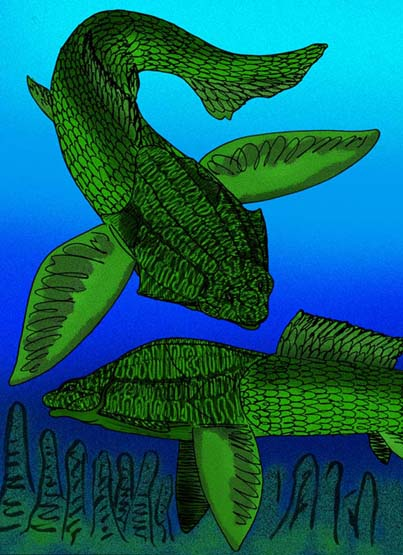
- Life restoration of the Middle-Late Devonian placoderm fish Holonema
  †Holonema
  - †Holonema horrida – type locality for species
  - †Holonema rugosa
- †Holopea
- †Holoptychius
  - †Holoptychius americanus
  - †Holoptychius filosus – type locality for species
  - †Holoptychius giganteus
- †Holoptychus
  - †Holoptychus flabellatus – type locality for species
  - †Holoptychus latus – type locality for species
  - †Holoptychus serrulatus – type locality for species
- †Homacanthus
  - †Homacanthus acinaciformis – type locality for species
- †Homilodonta
  - †Homilodonta filistriata
- †Hostimella
  - †Hostimella crispa
- †Housia
  - †Housia vacuna
- †Hudsonaster
  - †Hudsonaster lancolatus – or unidentified comparable form
- †Hughmilleria
  - †Hughmilleria shawangunk
- †Hymenocaris
- †Hymenozonotriletes
  - †Hymenozonotriletes explanatus
  - †Hymenozonotriletes granulatus
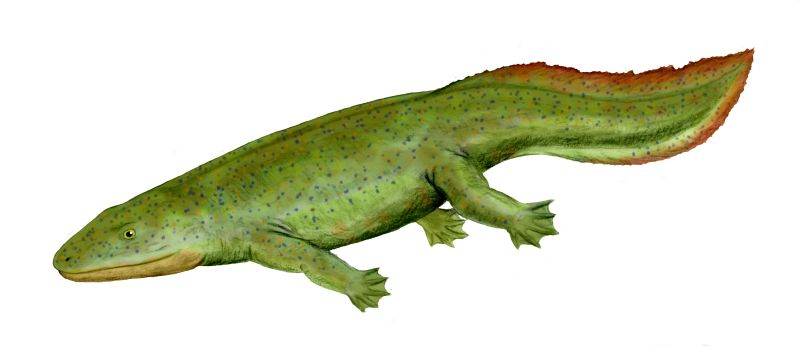
- Life restoration of the Late Devonian four-limbed animal precursor Hynerpeton
  †Hynerpeton – type locality for genus
  - †Hynerpeton bassetti – type locality for species
- †Hyolithellus
  - †Hyolithellus micans
- †Hyolithes
  - †Hyolithes wanneri
- †Hyolithid
- †Hypselentoma
  - †Hypselentoma perhumerosa
- †Hystricosporites
  - †Hystricosporites multifurcatus
  - †Hystricosporites porcatus
- †Hystriculina
  - †Hystriculina wabashensis

== I ==
- †Ianthinopsis
- †Iddingsia
  - †Iddingsia anatina
- †Idiomylacris – type locality for genus
  - †Idiomylacris gracilis – type locality for species
- †Imlerella
  - †Imlerella praecipita – type locality for species
- †Indiana – tentative report
- †Inflatia
- †Inocaulis
- †Iocrinus
  - †Iocrinus subcrassus
- †Irvingella
  - †Irvingella major
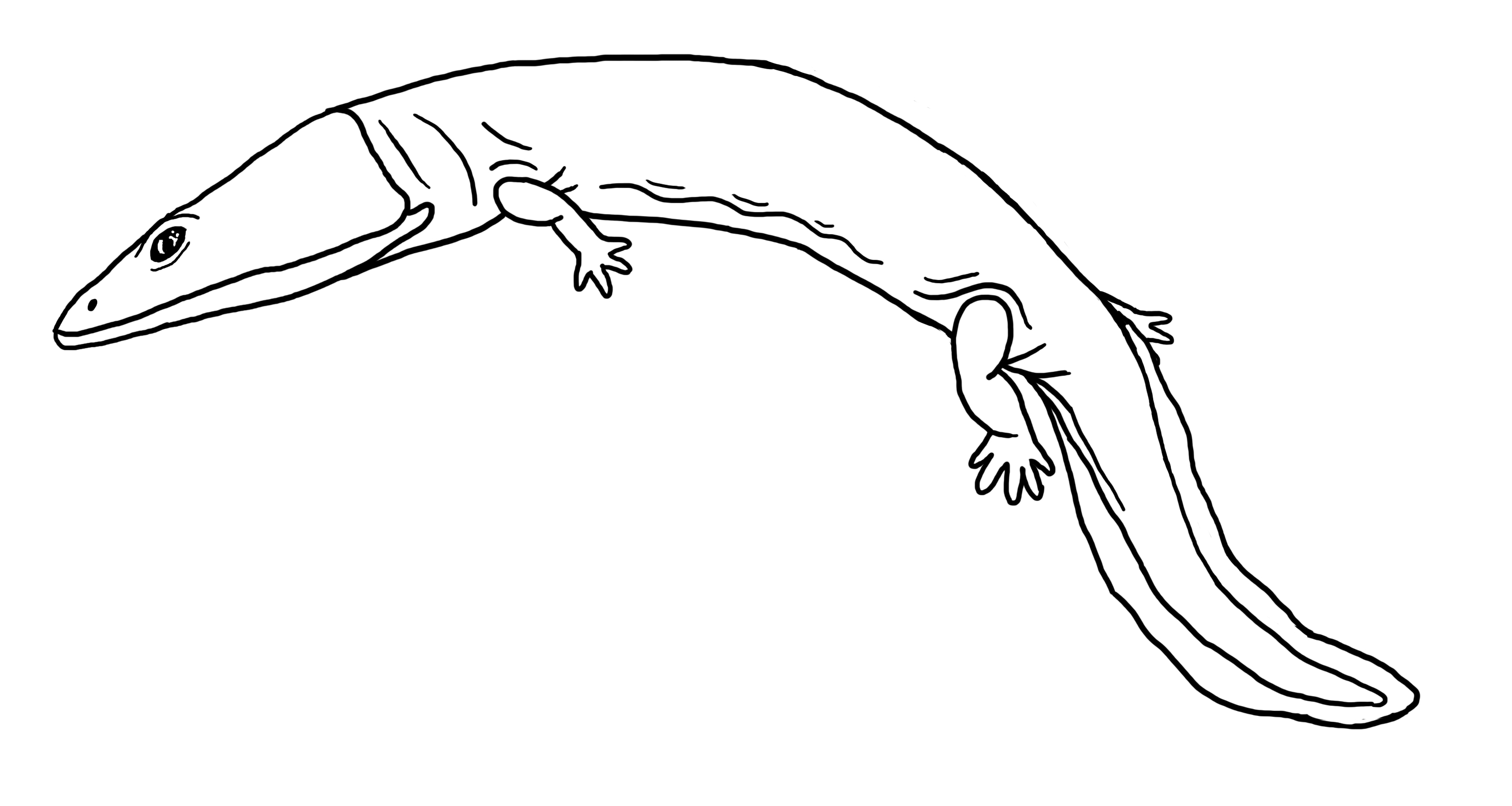
- Life restoration of the Permian amphibian Isodectes
  †Isodectes
  - †Isodectes obtusus – type locality for species
- †Isotelus
  - †Isotelus gigas
- †Ithycephalus

== K ==
- †Katabuporhynchus
  - †Katabuporhynchus mesacostalis
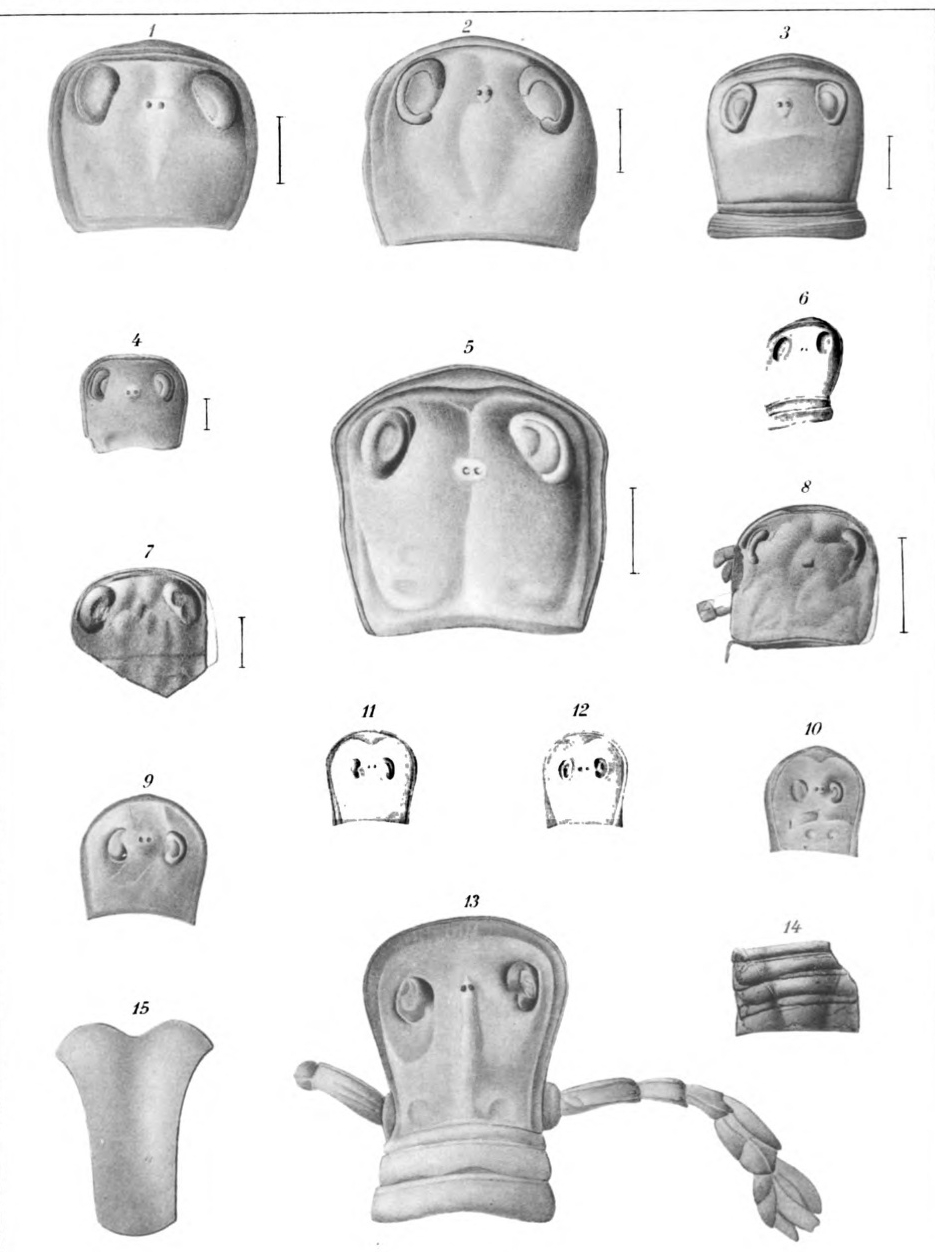
- Fossilized heads of the Silurian eurypterid ("sea scorpion") Kiaeropterus (specimens 1-8)
  †Kiaeropterus
  - †Kiaeropterus otisius
- †Kindbladia
  - †Kindbladia wichitaensis
- †Kingstonia
  - †Kingstonia apion
  - †Kingstonia ara
  - †Kingstonia cheilusis – type locality for species
  - †Kingstonia trapezoidia – type locality for species
  - †Kingstonia ulrichi – type locality for species
  - †Kingstonia walcotti
- †Kinklidoblatta
  - †Kinklidoblatta lesquereuxi – type locality for species
- †Kinocera – tentative report
- †Kinzercystis
  - †Kinzercystis durhami
- †Kinzeria – type locality for genus
  - †Kinzeria crinita – type locality for species
- †Kladognathus
- †Kloedinia
- †Knoxisporites
  - †Knoxisporites dedaleus
- †Kochiella
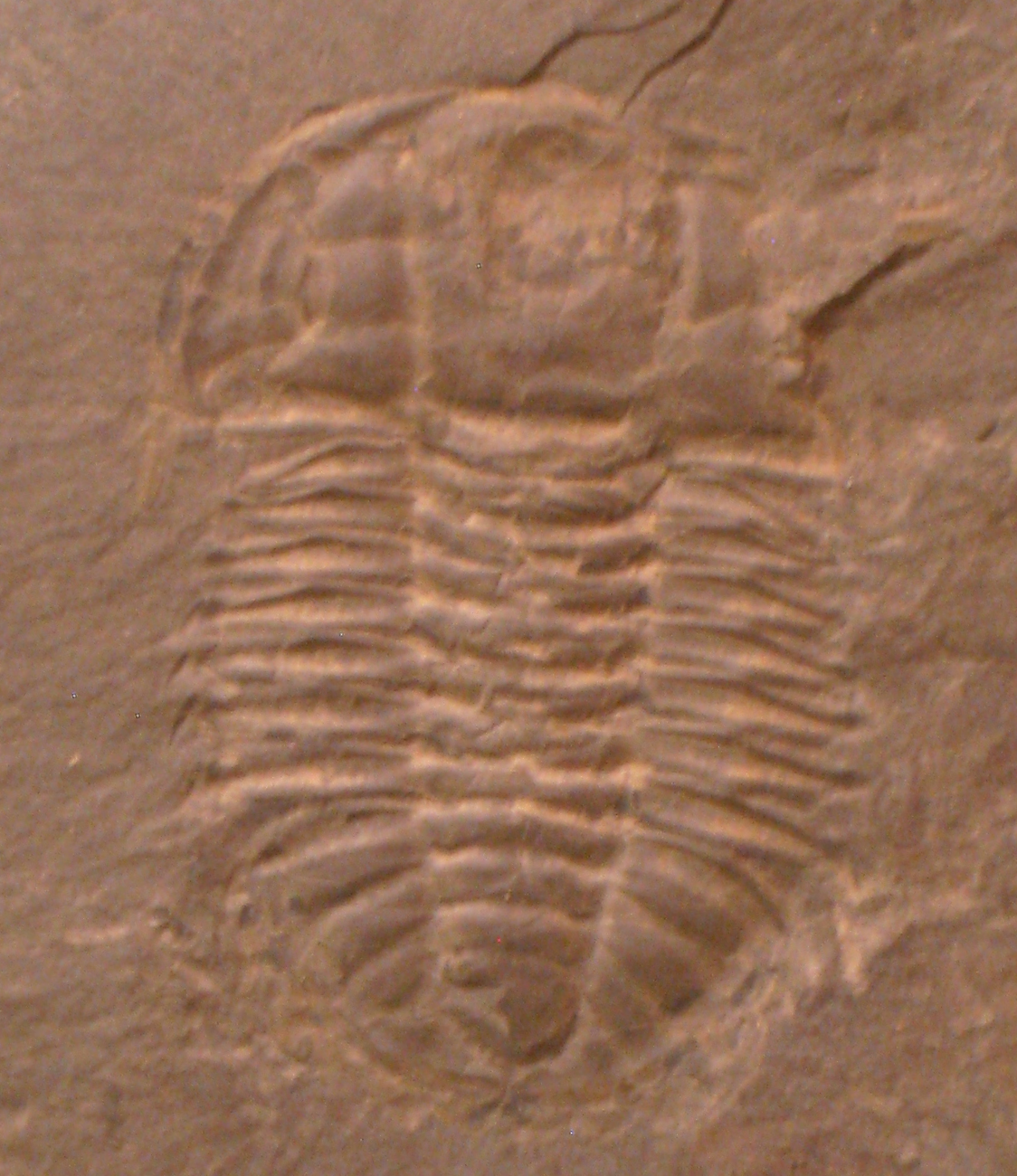
- Fossil of the Cambrian trilobite Kootenia
  †Kootenia
  - †Kootenia marcoui
- †Kraeuselisporites
- †Kutorgina
  - †Kutorgina cingulata
  - †Kutorgina edsoni
- †Kyphocephalus

== L ==
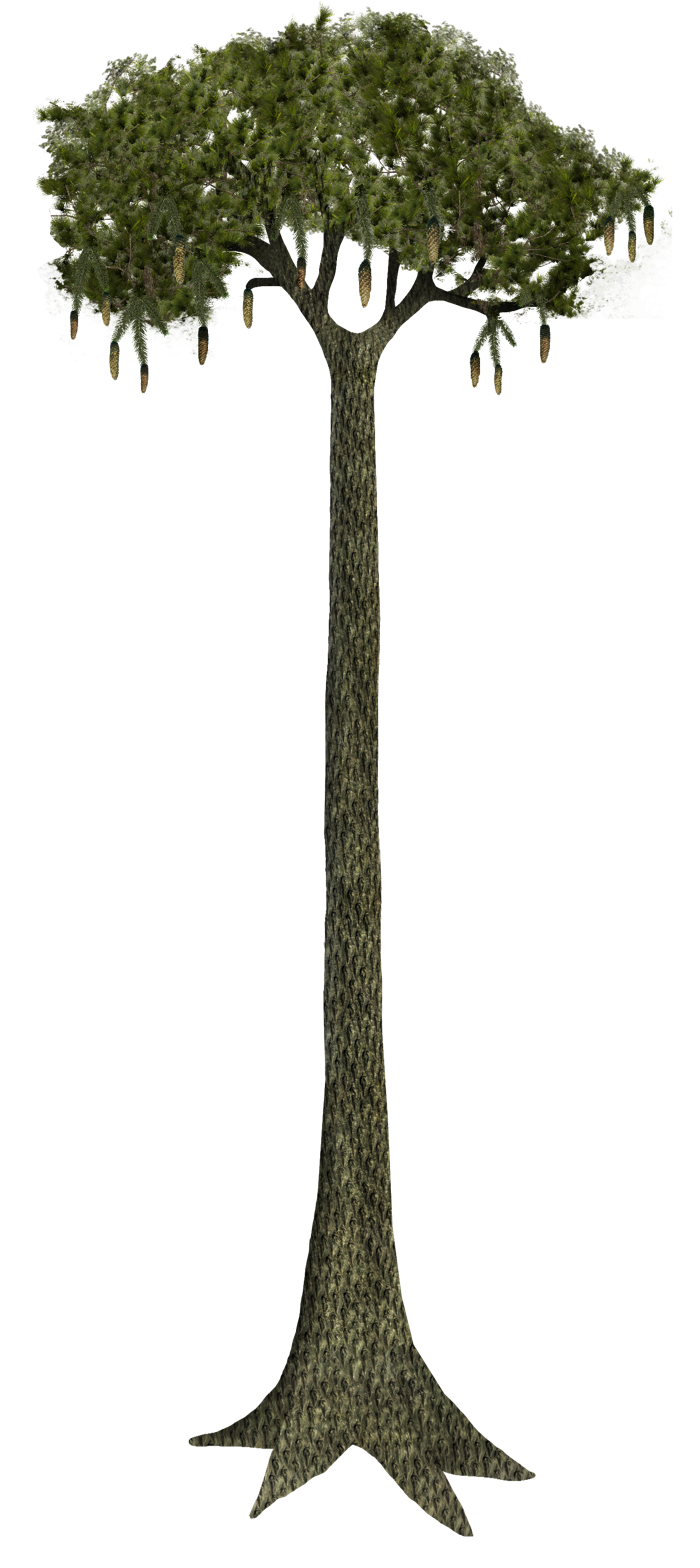
Life restoration of the Carboniferous tree-sized club moss relative Lepidodendron

- †Lacoea
  - †Lacoea seriata – type locality for species
- †Lagenospermum
  - †Lagenospermum imparirameum
- †Lambdagnathus
- †Lancastria
- †Lecanospira
  - †Lecanospira compacta
  - †Lecanospira salteri – or unidentified comparable form
- †Leiorhynchus
- †Leiozonotriletes
- †Lepdidodendropsis
- †Leperditia
- †Lepidocystis
  - †Lepidocystis wanneri
- †Lepidodendropsis
  - †Lepidodendropsis scobiniformis
  - †Lepidodendropsis stigillariodes
  - †Lepidodendropsis stigillaroides
  - †Lepidodendropsis vandergrachti
- †Lepidostrobus
  - †Lepidostrobus gallowayi
- †Leptaena
  - †Leptaena rhomboidalis
  - †Leptaena richmondensis – or unidentified comparable form
- †Leptodesma
  - †Leptodesma cadmus
  - †Leptodesma extenuatum
  - †Leptodesma hector
  - †Leptodesma laevis
  - †Leptodesma lichas
  - †Leptodesma maclurii
  - †Leptodesma mortoni
  - †Leptodesma naviforme
  - †Leptodesma nereus
  - †Leptodesma nitida
  - †Leptodesma orus
  - †Leptodesma patulum
  - †Leptodesma pelops
  - †Leptodesma phaon
  - †Leptodesma sayi
  - †Leptodesma sociale
  - †Leptodesma spinerigum
- †Leptomitus
- †Lichenocrinus
- Lingula
  - †Lingula carbonaria
  - †Lingula delia
  - †Lingula ligea
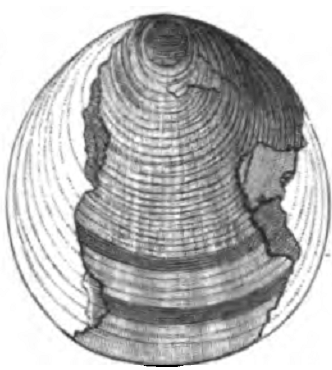
- Illustration of a fossilized shell of the Cambrian-Late Ordovician brachiopod Lingulella
  †Lingulella
  - †Lingulella marcia – or unidentified comparable form
- †Lingulepis
  - †Lingulepis acuminata
- †Linoproductus
  - †Linoproductus cora
- †Liospira
  - †Liospira americana
- †Llanoaspidella – type locality for genus
  - †Llanoaspidella bigenusia – type locality for species
  - †Llanoaspidella warriorsmarkensis – type locality for species
- †Llanoaspis – tentative report
- †Lonchocephalus
  - †Lonchocephalus planus – type locality for species
  - †Lonchocephalus swartzi – type locality for species
  - †Lonchocephalus waddlei – type locality for species
- †Longispina
  - †Longispina mucronatus
- †Lophophyllidium
  - †Lophophyllidium profundum
- †Lophospira
- †Lophozonotriletes
  - †Lophozonotriletes excisus
  - †Lophozonotriletes tuberosus
- †Loxonema
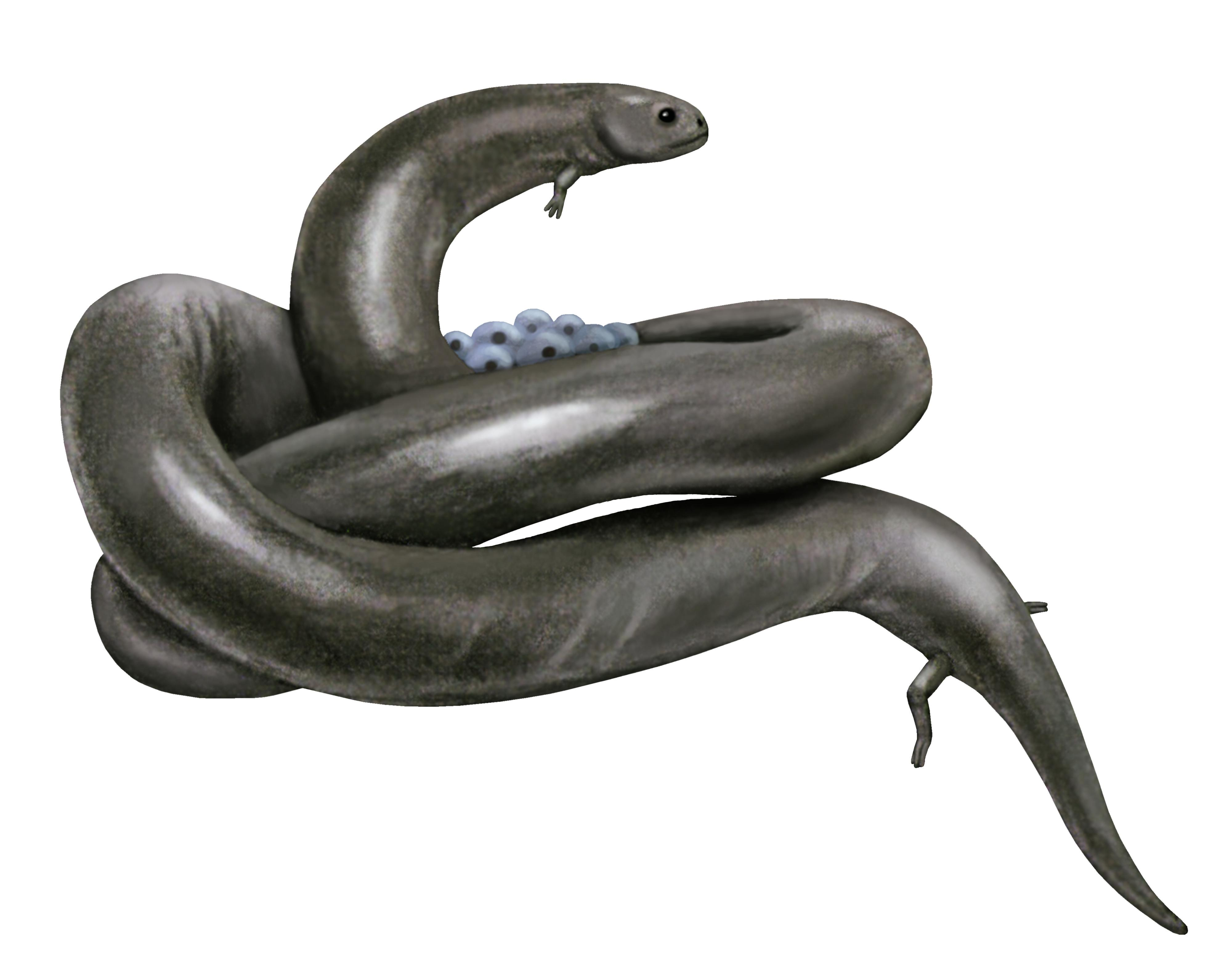
- Life restoration of the Permian snake-like amphibian Lysorophus showing speculative egg-coiling behavior
  †Lysorophus
  - †Lysorophus dunkardensis

== M ==
- †Macluritella – tentative report
  - †Macluritella multiseptarius
- †Maeneceras
  - †Maeneceras milleri
- †Margaretia
- †Mariopteris
- †Martinia
- †Mediospirifer
  - †Mediospirifer audaculus
  - †Mediospirifer belliplicata
  - †Mediospirifer bellitropis
  - †Mediospirifer dromgoldi
- †Megakozlowskiella
  - †Megakozlowskiella sculptilis
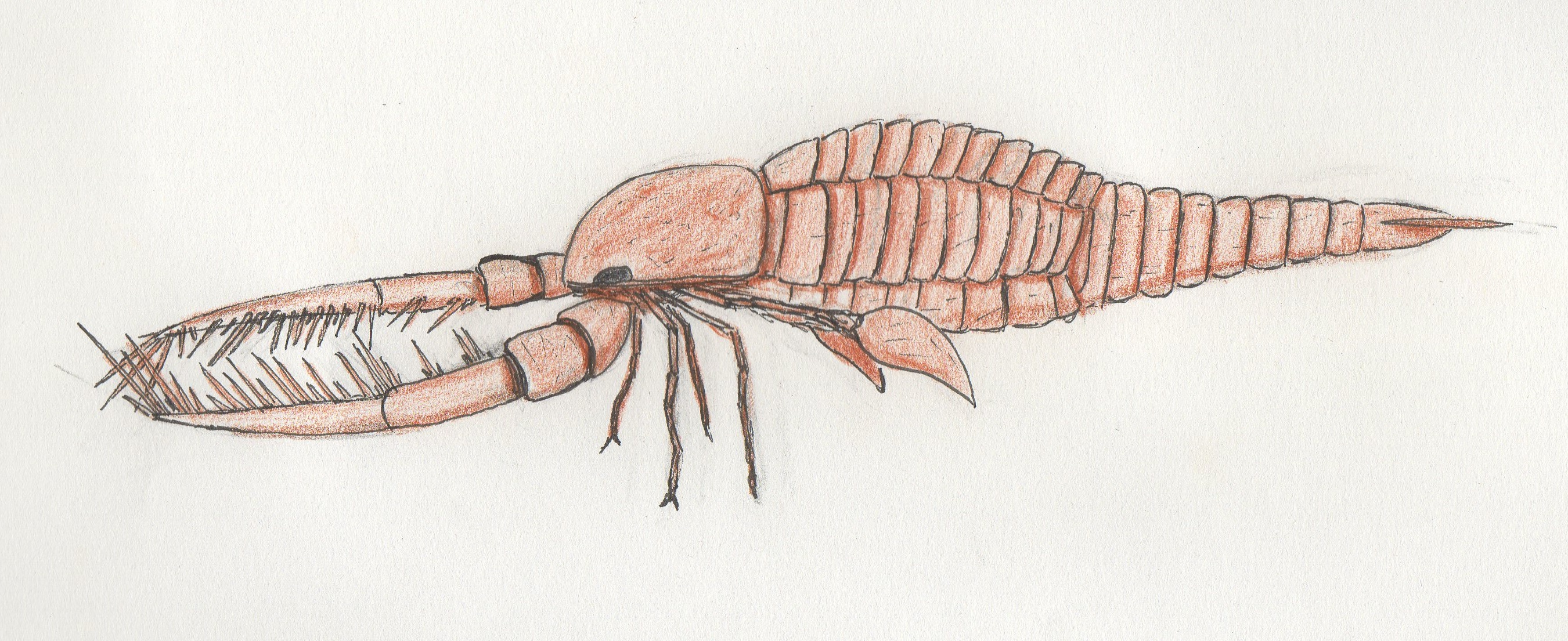
- Life restoration of the Late Ordovician eurypterid ("sea scorpion") Megalograptus
  †Megalograptus – tentative report
- †Megamolgophis
  - †Megamolgophis agostinii
- †Megastrophia
- †Menomonia
  - †Menomonia calymenoides
- †Mesitoblatta
  - †Mesitoblatta emersoni – type locality for species
- †Mesotaphraspis
- †Metacoceras
  - †Metacoceras cornutum
- †Metaxyblatta – type locality for genus
  - †Metaxyblatta hadroptera – type locality for species
- †Metropator – type locality for genus
  - †Metropator pusillus – type locality for species
- †Michelinoceras
- †Micromitra
  - †Micromitra alabamensis
- †Mimagoniatites – tentative report
- †Modiella
  - †Modiella pygmaea
- †Modiolopsis
- †Modiomorpha
  - †Modiomorpha concentrica
- †Modocia
  - †Modocia benorensis – type locality for species
- †Monotrypa
  - †Monotrypa benjamini
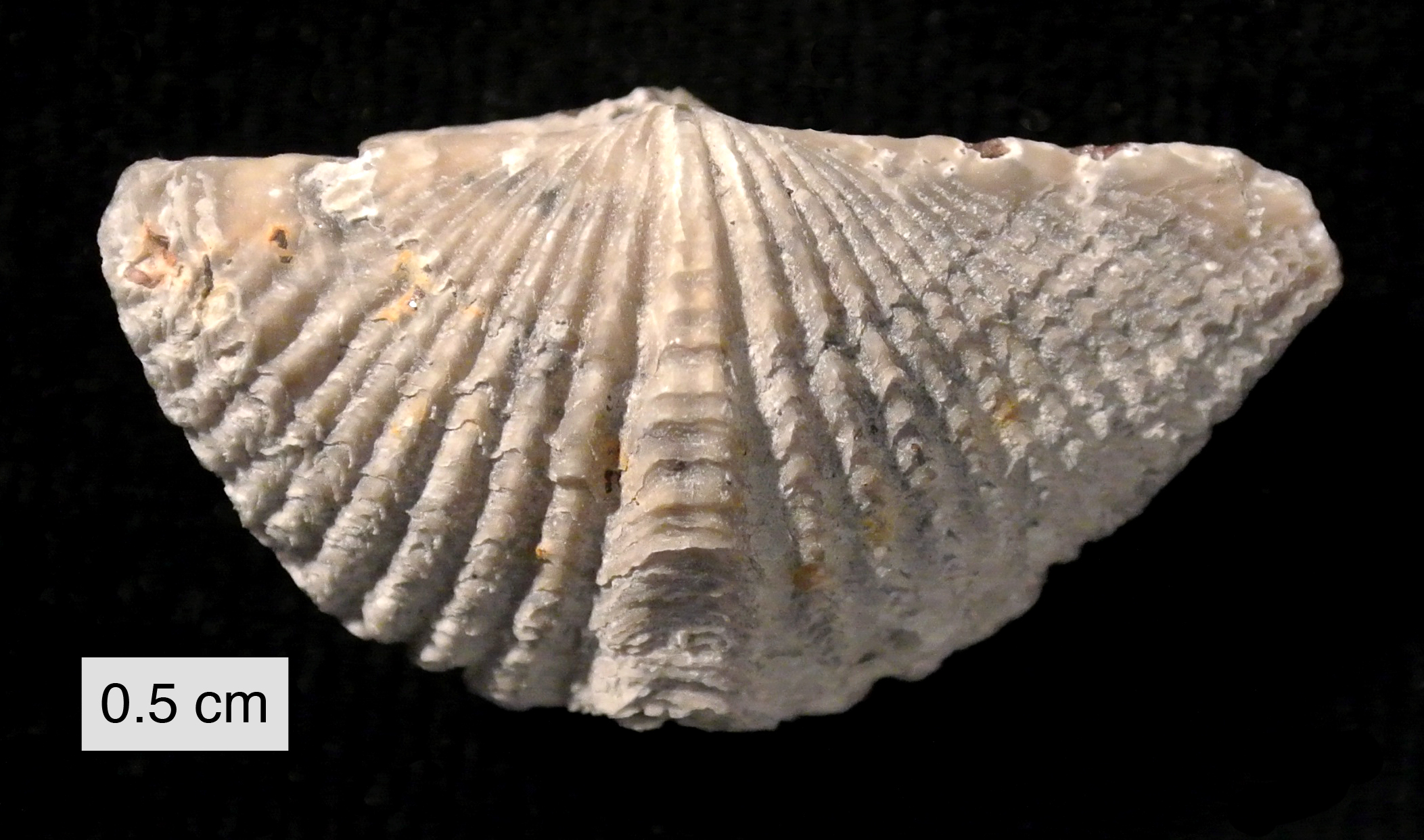
- Fossilized shell of the Devonian brachiopod Mucrospirifer
  †Mucrospirifer
  - †Mucrospirifer mucronatus
- †Mylacridae
  - †Mylacridae carbonina
- †Mylacris
  - †Mylacris angusta – type locality for species
  - †Mylacris anthracophila – type locality for species
  - †Mylacris dubia – type locality for species
  - †Mylacris lucifuga – type locality for species
  - †Mylacris ovalis – type locality for species
  - †Mylacris pennsylvanica – type locality for species
  - †Mylacris truncatula – type locality for species

== N ==
- †Nalivkinella
  - †Nalivkinella echoense
- †Nanahughmilleria
  - †Nanahughmilleria clarkei
- †Naticonema
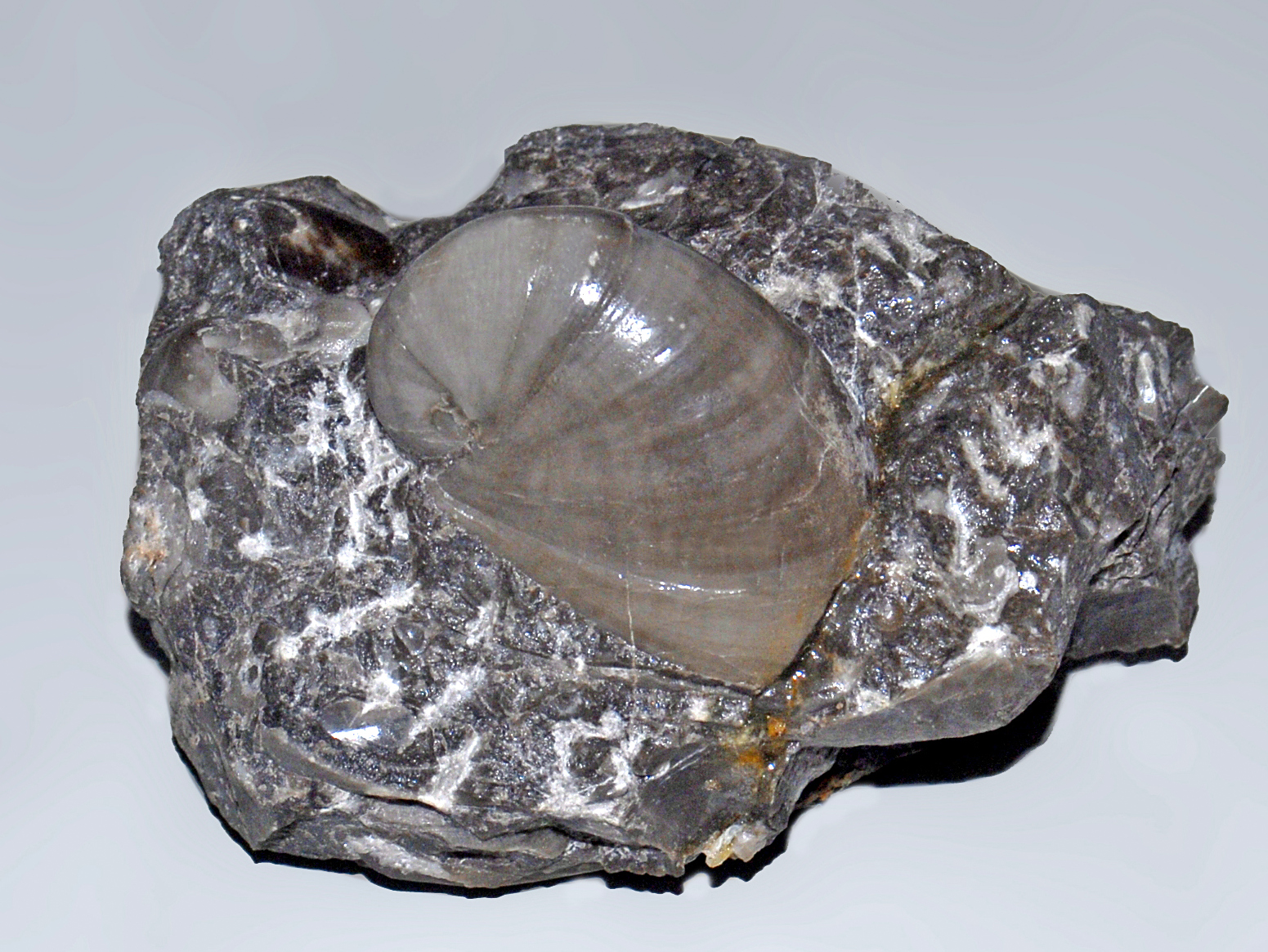
- Fossilized shell of the Early Devonian – Triassic sea snail Naticopsis
  †Naticopsis
- †Necymylacris
  - †Necymylacris heros – type locality for species
  - †Necymylacris lacoana – type locality for species
- †Neoblairella – type locality for genus
  - †Neoblairella crassimarginata – type locality for species
- †Neochonetes
  - †Neochonetes granulifer
- †Neomylacris
  - †Neomylacris major – type locality for species
  - †Neomylacris pulla – type locality for species
- †Neoprionodus
- †Neoraistrickia
- †Neosimplicius – type locality for genus
  - †Neosimplicius medialis – type locality for species
- †Neospirifer
  - †Neospirifer cameratus
- †Neriopteris
  - †Neriopteris lanceolata
- †Nervostrophia
  - †Nervostrophia nervosa
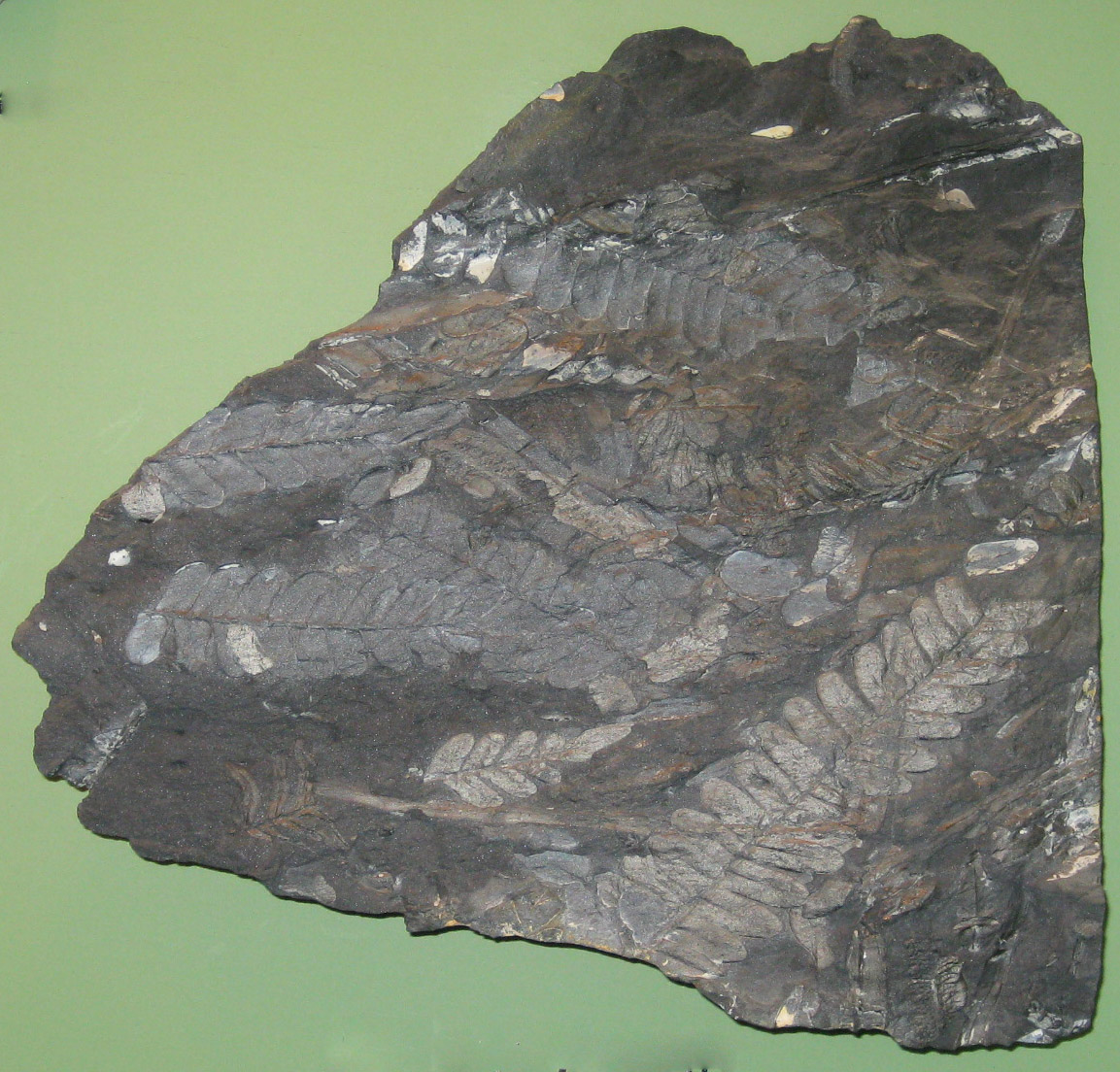
- Fronds of the Carboniferous seed fern Neuropteris
  †Neuropteris
- †Nisusia
  - †Nisusia festinata
- Nucula
  - †Nucula bellistriata
  - †Nucula lirata
- Nuculana
- †Nuculites
  - †Nuculites oblongatus
  - †Nuculites planulatus
  - †Nuculites triqueter
- †Nuculopsis
  - †Nuculopsis girtyi

== O ==
- †Octonaria
  - †Octonaria bifurcata
  - †Octonaria dicristata
  - †Octonaria quadricostata
- †Ogygopsis
  - †Ogygopsis klotzi
- †Olenellus
  - †Olenellus alius
  - †Olenellus similaris
  - †Olenellus wanneri
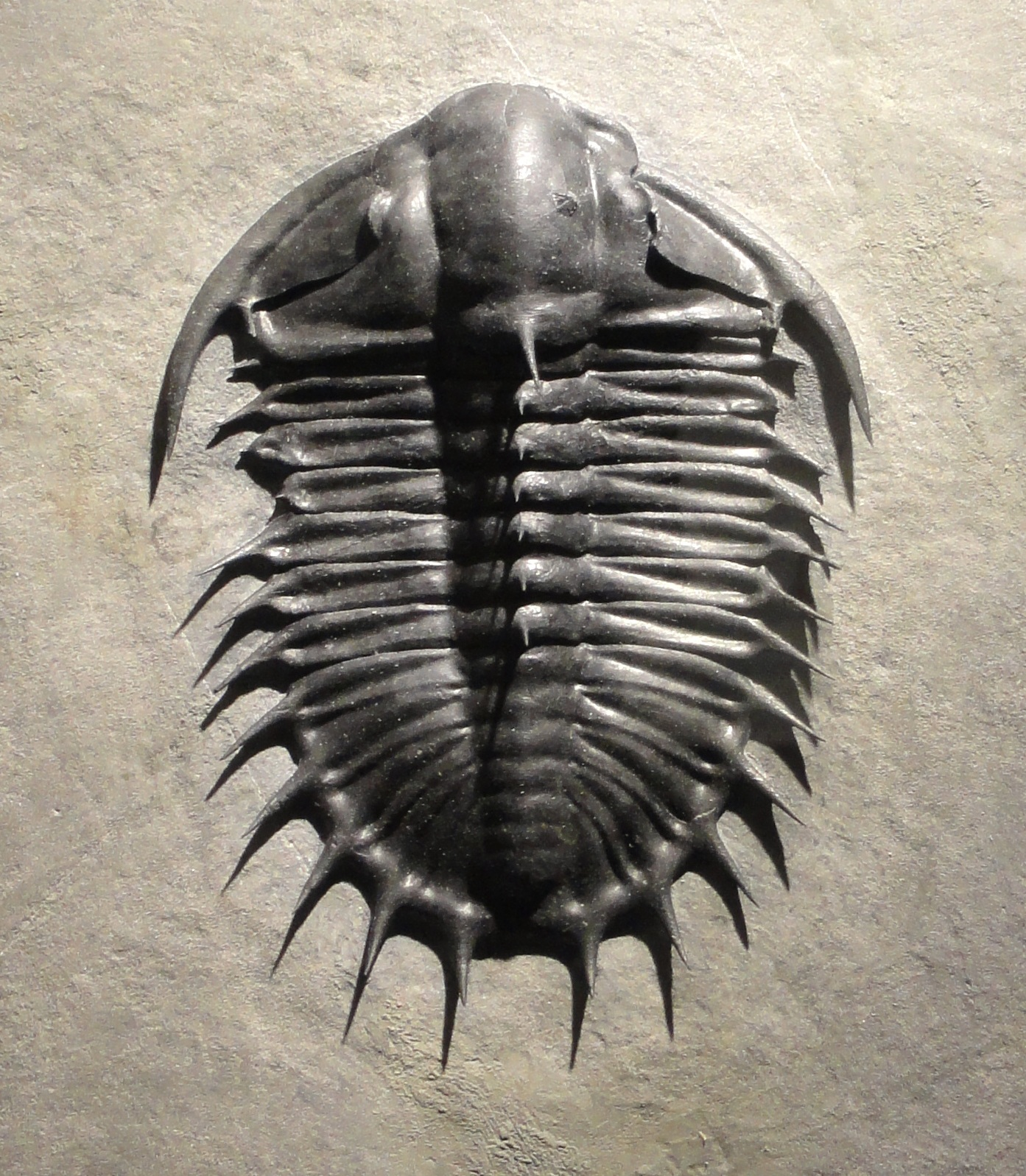
- Fossil of the Cambrian trilobite Olenoides
  †Olenoides
  - †Olenoides buttsi – type locality for species
  - †Olenoides pennsylvanicus – type locality for species
  - †Olenoides serratus
- †Olethroblatta
  - †Olethroblatta americana – type locality for species
- †Orbiculoidea
  - †Orbiculoidea tullia
- †Orsadesmus – type locality for genus
  - †Orsadesmus rubecollus – type locality for species
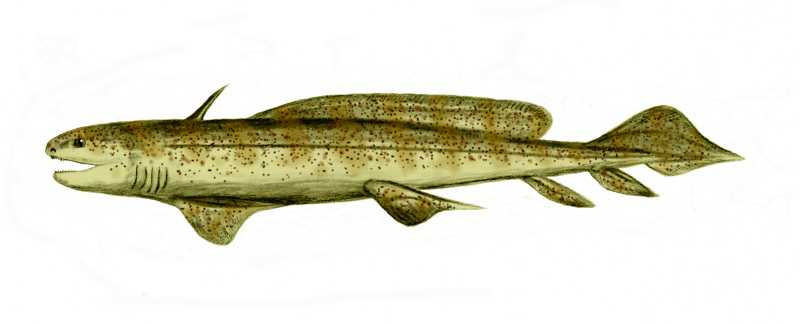
- Life restoration of the Carboniferous-Permian freshwater shark Orthacanthus
  †Orthacanthus
  - †Orthacanthus compressus
  - †Orthacanthus platypternus
  - †Orthacanthus texensis
- †Orthoceras
- †Orthograptus
  - †Orthograptus quadrimucronatus
- †Orthomylacris
  - †Orthomylacris alutacea – type locality for species
  - †Orthomylacris analis – type locality for species
  - †Orthomylacris cordiformis – type locality for species
  - †Orthomylacris mansfieldi – type locality for species
  - †Orthomylacris pauperata – type locality for species
  - †Orthomylacris pennsylvaniae – type locality for species
  - †Orthomylacris pittstoniana – type locality for species
  - †Orthomylacris pluteus – type locality for species
- †Orthonota
  - †Orthonota parvula – tentative report
  - †Orthonota undulata
- †Orthonychia
  - †Orthonychia parva
- †Orthotetes
- †Orthotheca
  - †Orthotheca shriveri – type locality for species
- †Oryctocephalus
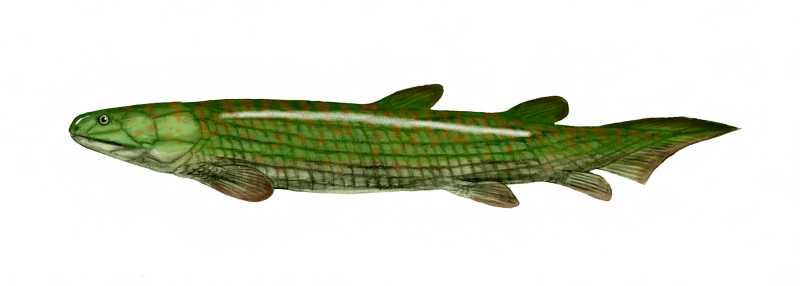
- Restoration
  †Osteolepis
- †Oulodus
- †Ovatia
- †Oxynoblatta
  - †Oxynoblatta vicina – type locality for species
- †Ozarkodina

== P ==
- †Paedeumias
  - †Paedeumias eboracense
  - †Paedeumias glabrum
  - †Paedeumias yorkense
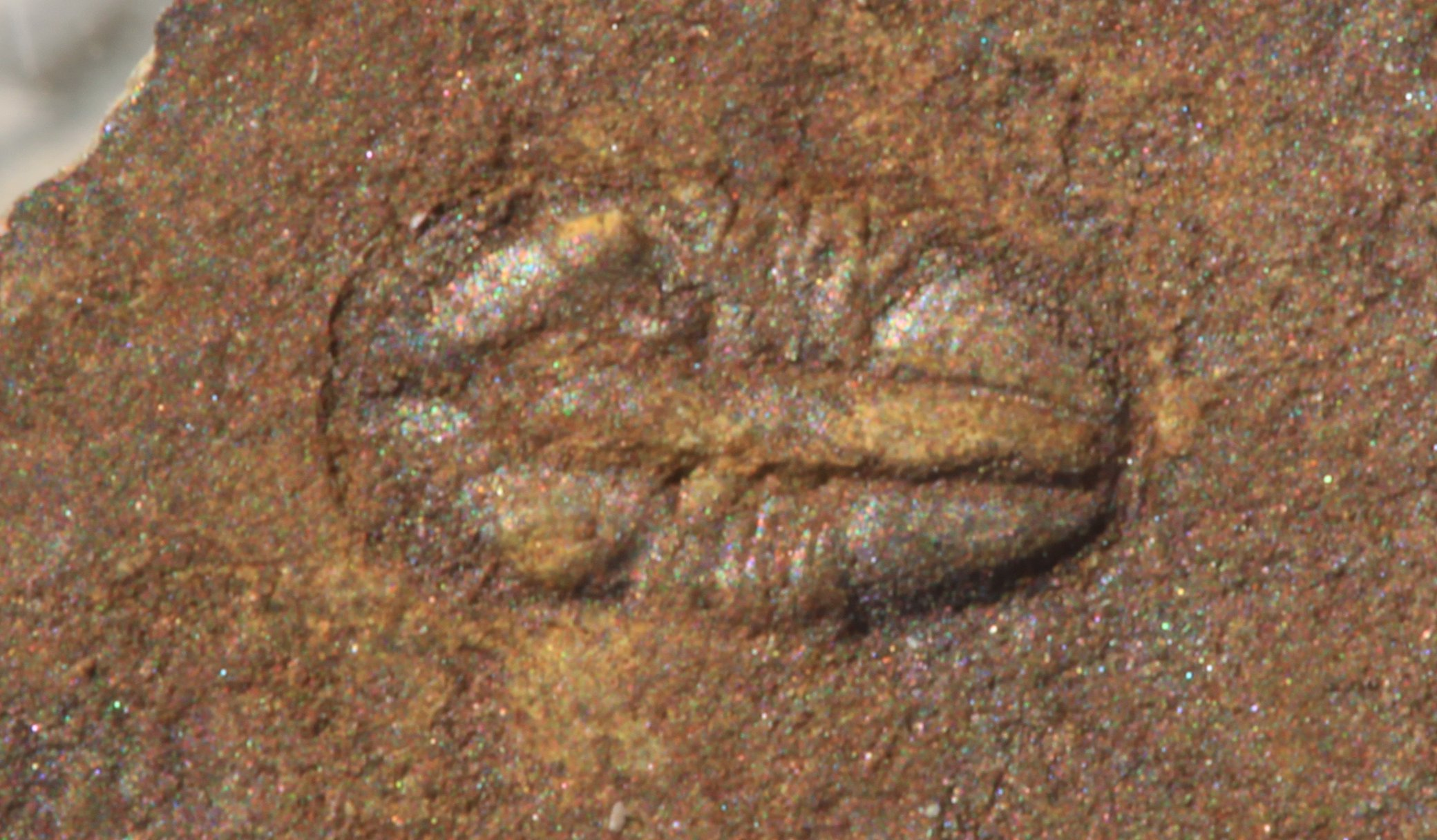
- Fossil of the Cambrian trilobite Pagetia
  †Pagetia
- †Paladin
- †Palaeoneilo
  - †Palaeoneilo constricta
  - †Palaeoneilo fecunda
  - †Palaeoneilo muta
  - †Palaeoneilo oweni
  - †Palaeoneilo plana
  - †Palaeoneilo tenuistriata
- †Palaeotherates
  - †Palaeotherates pennsylvanicus – type locality for species
- †Palaeozygopleura
  - †Palaeozygopleura delphicola
- †Panenka
- †Parabolbina
  - †Parabolbina cardocornella
  - †Parabolbina obliqua
- †Parabolinella
  - †Parabolinella occidentalis
- †Parabolinoides
- †Paracyclas
  - †Paracyclas lirata
- †Parahaplophlebium
  - †Parahaplophlebium longipenne – type locality for species
- †Parahughmilleria
  - †Parahughmilleria maria
- †Parajuresania
  - †Parajuresania nebrascensis
- †Parallelodon
  - †Parallelodon obsoletus
- †Paranacystites
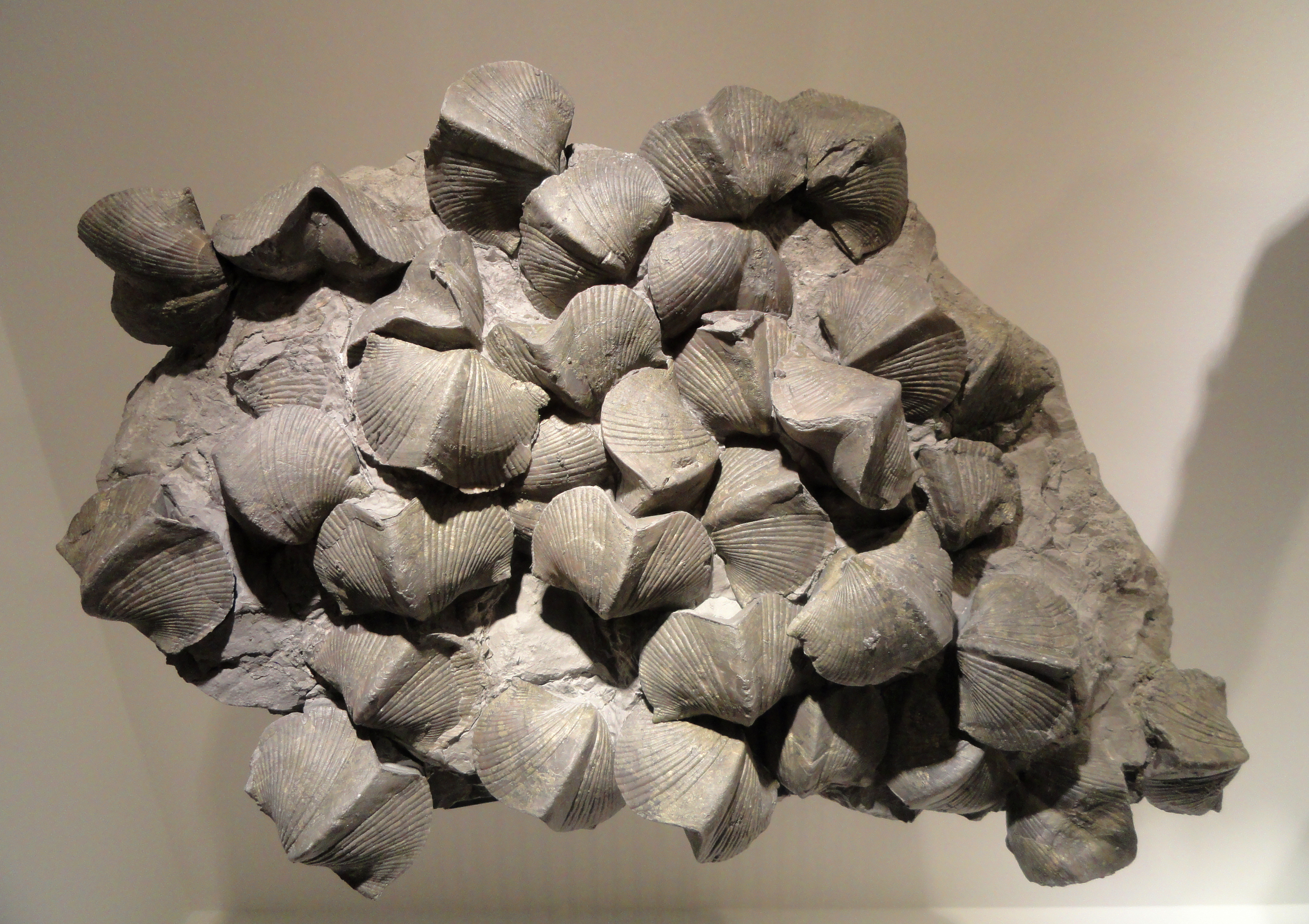
- Assemblage of the Early-Middle Devonian brachiopod Paraspirifer
  †Paraspirifer
  - †Paraspirifer acuminatus
- †Parvohallopora
  - †Parvohallopora dalei – or unidentified comparable form
- †Paterina
  - †Paterina bella
- †Pelagiella
- †Pemphigaspis
  - †Pemphigaspis bullata
  - †Pemphigaspis intermedia – type locality for species
  - †Pemphigaspis matutina
- †Penniretepora
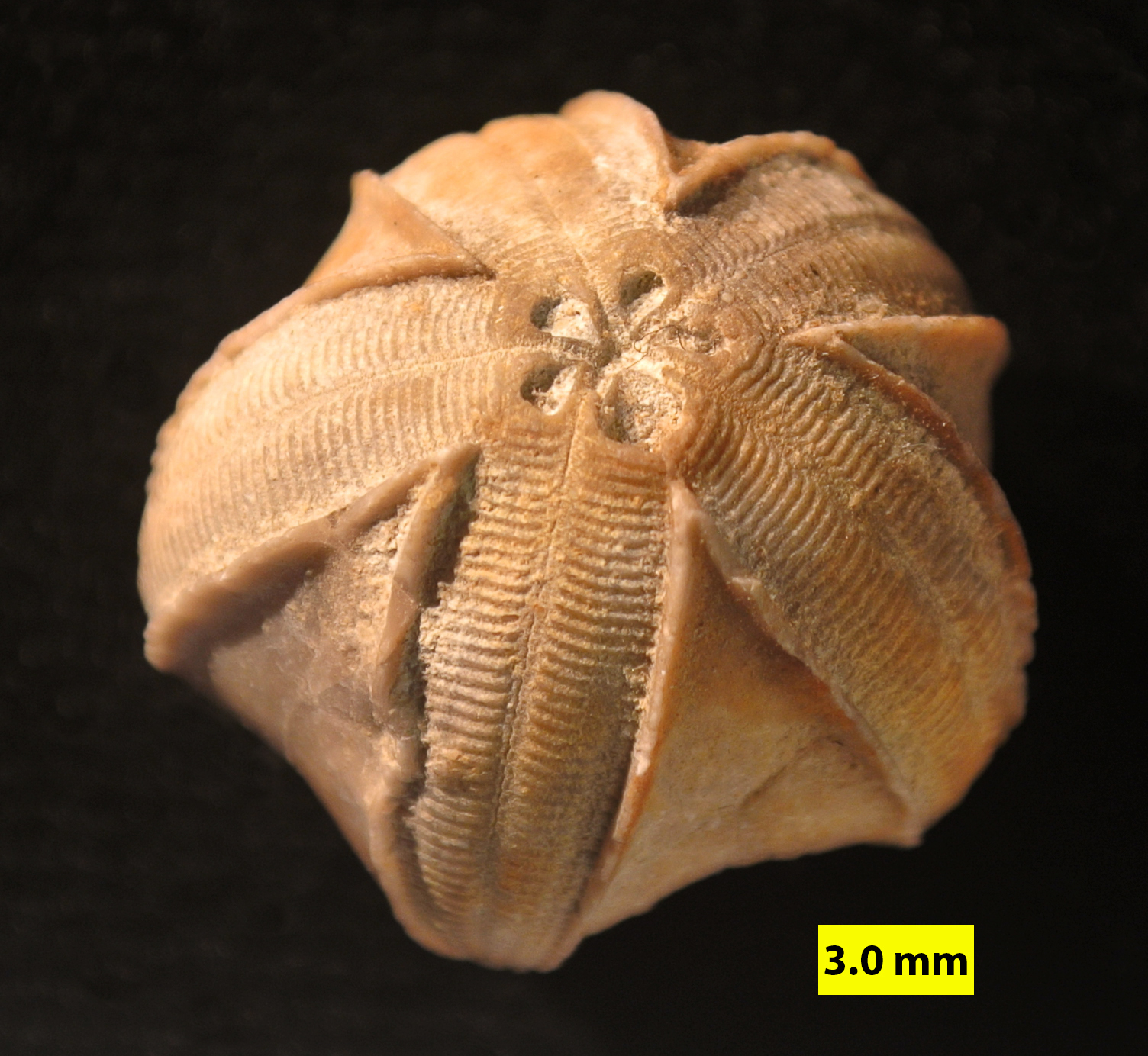
- Fossilized theca of the Carboniferous blastoid echinoderm ("sea bud") Pentremites
  †Pentremites
- †Periomella
  - †Periomella roddyi
  - †Periomella yorkensis
- †Peronopsis
- †Petalodus
  - †Petalodus ohioensis
- †Petrocrania
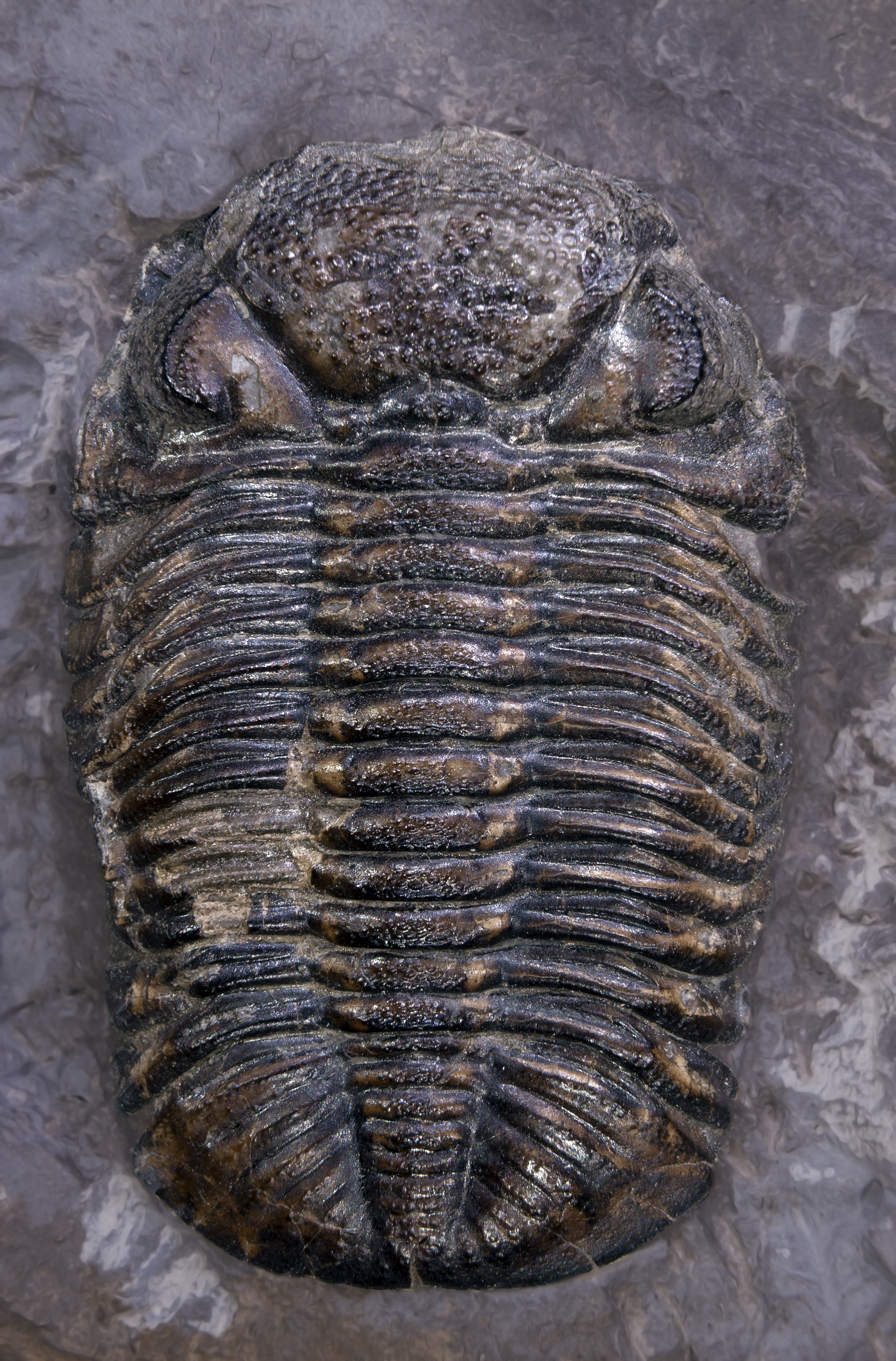
- Fossil of the Devonian trilobite Phacops rana
  †Phacops
- †Pharkidonotus
  - †Pharkidonotus percarinatus
- †Phestia
- †Philhedra
  - †Philhedra laelia – or unidentified comparable form
- †Phoberoblatta – type locality for genus
  - †Phoberoblatta grandis – type locality for species
  - †Phoberoblatta reticulata – type locality for species
- †Pholidops
- †Pholidostrophia
  - †Pholidostrophia pennsylvanica
- †Phragmactis
- †Phricodothyris
- †Phthinomylacris
  - †Phthinomylacris medialis – type locality for species
  - †Phthinomylacris pauper – type locality for species
- †Phthonia
  - †Phthonia sectifrons
- †Phyloblatta
  - †Phyloblatta indecisa – type locality for species
  - †Phyloblatta prior – type locality for species
- †Pinctus
  - †Pinctus latus
- Pinna
- †Pionoceras
  - †Pionoceras swartzi
- †Plagioblatta
  - †Plagioblatta campbelli – type locality for species
  - †Plagioblatta cockerelli – type locality for species
- †Plagioglypta
  - †Plagioglypta meekiana
- †Planoendothyra – tentative report
  - †Planoendothyra associata
- †Planutenia
  - †Planutenia flectata
- †Plasiochiton – type locality for genus
  - †Plasiochiton curiosus – type locality for species
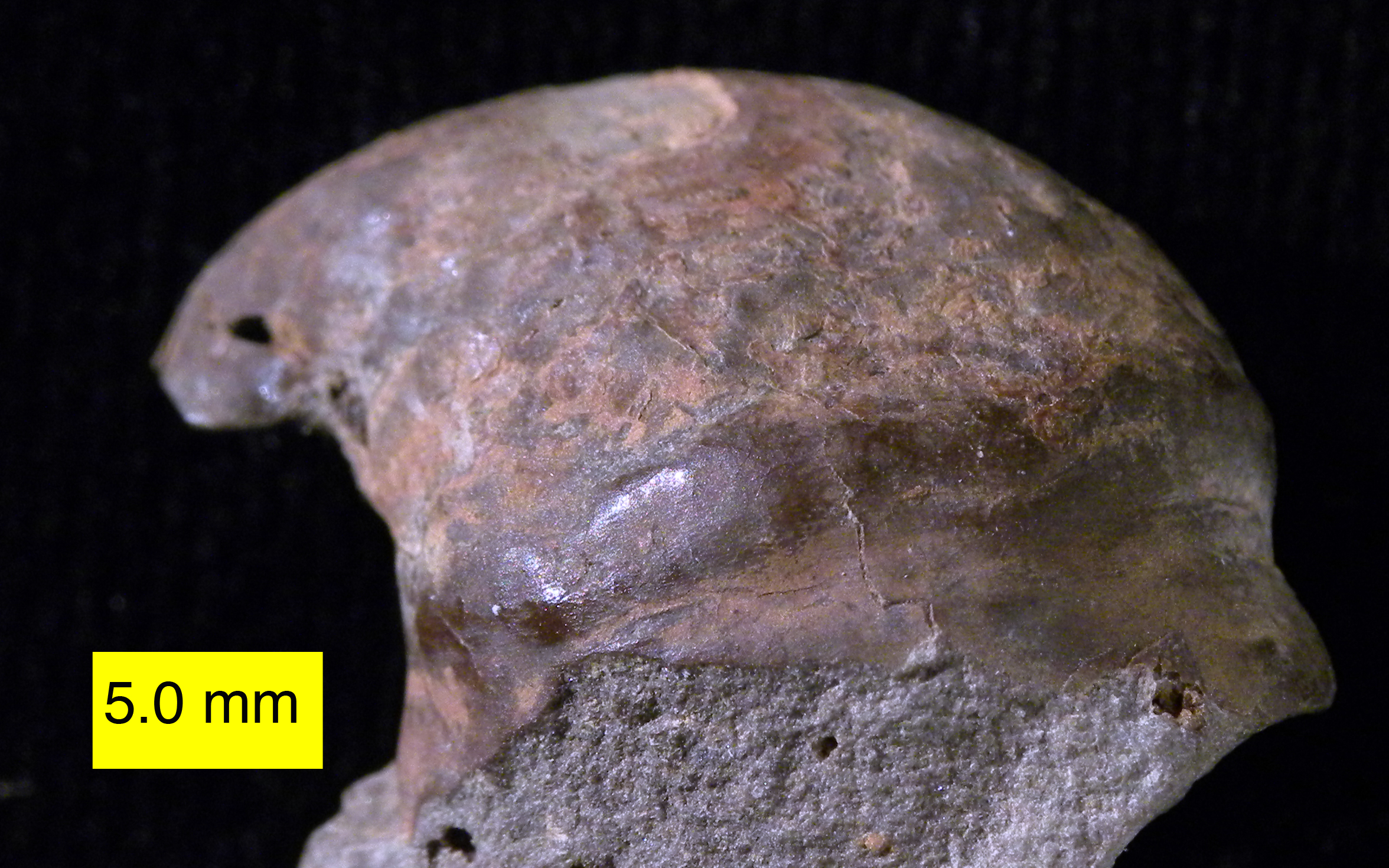
- Fossilized shell of the Silurian-Early Triassic sea snail Platyceras
  †Platyceras
  - †Platyceras euomphaloides
  - †Platyceras lineatum
- †Platylichas
- †Plectorthis
  - †Plectorthis plicatella
- †Pleurodictyum
  - †Pleurodictyum styloporum
- †Polidevcia
  - †Polidevcia bellistriata
- †Poliella
  - †Poliella bala
- †Polypora
- †Ponderodictya
  - †Ponderodictya favulosa
  - †Ponderodictya punctulifera
- †Poroblattina
  - †Poroblattina parvula – type locality for species
- †Praewaagenoconcha
  - †Praewaagenoconcha speciosa
- †Primitiella
  - †Primitiella unicornis
- †Prismopora
- †Productella
  - †Productella rectispina
- †Productus
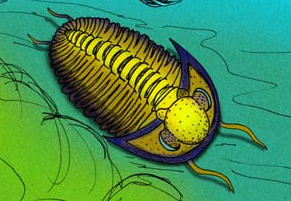
- Restoration of the Silurian trilobite Proetus
  †Proetus
  - †Proetus haldemani – tentative report
  - †Proetus parviusculus
- †Prolepidodendron
  - †Prolepidodendron breviinternodium
- †Promopalaeaster
  - †Promopalaeaster bellulus
  - †Promopalaeaster pricei
- †Promytilus
- †Protobarinophyton
  - †Protobarinophyton pennsylvanicum
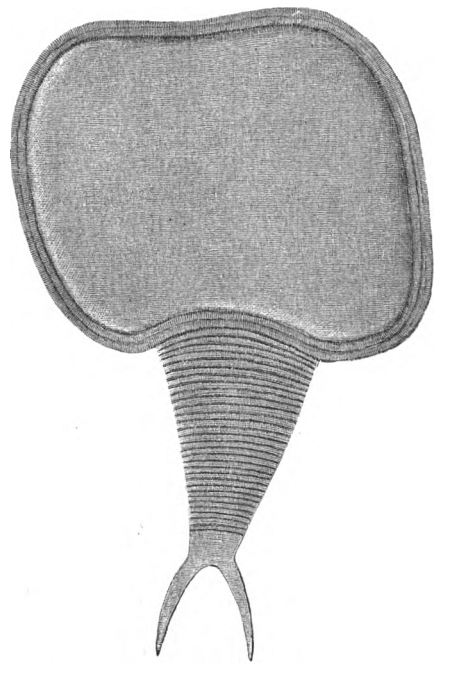
- Illustration of a fossil of the Cambrian crustacean Protocaris
  †Protocaris
- †Protocycloceras
  - †Protocycloceras rushense
- †Protoleptostrophia
  - †Protoleptostrophia perplana
- †Protomya – or unidentified comparable form
- †Protospongia – tentative report
- †Prozacanthoides
- †Pseudoatrypa
  - †Pseudoatrypa devoniana
- †Pseudolingula
  - †Pseudolingula rectilateralis
- †Pseudopaolia
  - †Pseudopaolia lacoana – type locality for species
- †Pseudopolyernus
  - †Pseudopolyernus laminarum – type locality for species
- †Pseudosaratogia
  - †Pseudosaratogia bulbosa
  - †Pseudosaratogia lata – tentative report
  - †Pseudosaratogia magna
- †Pseudotealliocaris
  - †Pseudotealliocaris palincsari
- †Pteridomylacris – type locality for genus
  - †Pteridomylacris paradoxa – type locality for species
- †Pterinea
- †Pterinopecten
  - †Pterinopecten hermes
  - †Pterinopecten princeps
- †Pterochaenia
- †Pterygometopus
  - †Pterygometopus achates
- †Ptilograptus
- †Ptilomylacris – type locality for genus
  - †Ptilomylacris medialis – type locality for species
- †Ptilopora
- †Ptomatis
- †Ptychoglyptus
  - †Ptychoglyptus virginensis – or unidentified comparable form
- †Ptychoparella
  - †Ptychoparella lancastra
- †Ptychopteria
  - †Ptychopteria chemungensis
  - †Ptychopteria flabella
  - †Ptychopteria salamanca
- †Ptylopora
- †Pugnax
  - †Pugnax pugnus
- †Pustula
  - †Pustula pertenuis
- †Pustulatia
  - †Pustulatia pustulosa

== Q ==
- †Quasillites

== R ==
- †Rafinesquina
  - †Rafinesquina alternata
- †Retichonetes
  - †Retichonetes marylandicus
  - †Retichonetes vicinus
- †Retispira
  - †Retispira marcouianus
- †Retusotriletes
  - †Retusotriletes phillipsii
- †Rhacophyton
- †Rhacopteris
- †Rhinidictya
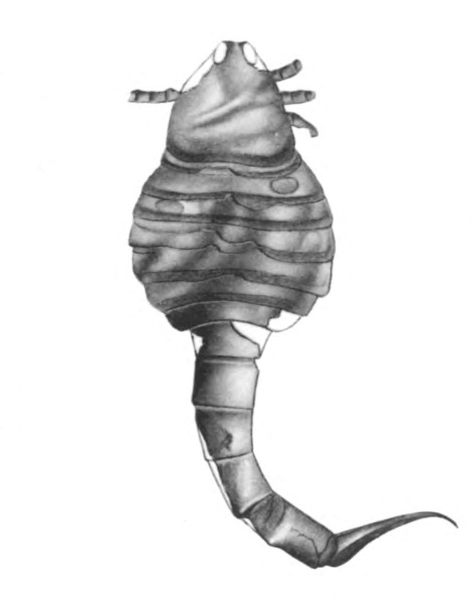
- Fossil of the Silurian eurypterid ("sea scorpion") Rhinocarcinosoma
  †Rhinocarcinosoma
  - †Rhinocarcinosoma cicerops
- †Rhipidomella
  - †Rhipidomella leucosia
  - †Rhipidomella penelope
  - †Rhipidomella vanuxemi
- †Rhodea
  - †Rhodea alleghanensis – type locality for species
  - †Rhodea tionestana – type locality for species
  - †Rhodea vespertina – type locality for species
- †Rhombopora
- †Rhytimya
  - †Rhytimya radiata
- †Ribeiria
  - †Ribeiria parva – or unidentified comparable form
- †Roddyia
- †Rodea (genus)
  - †Rodea vespertina – type locality for species
- †Ruedemannipterus
  - †Ruedemannipterus stylonuroides
- †Rugospora
  - †Rugospora flexuosa

== S ==
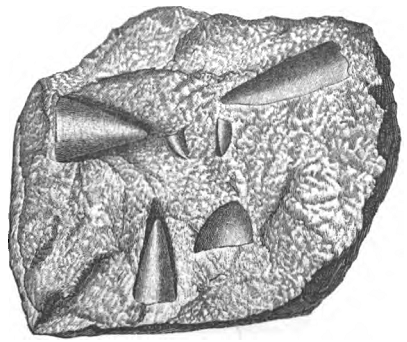
- Illustration of fossilized shells of the mysterious Cambrian organism Salterella
  †Salterella
  - †Salterella acervulosa
  - †Salterella conulata
  - †Salterella mccullochi
  - †Salterella pulchella
- †Sanguinolites
- †Sapphicorhynchus
  - †Sapphicorhynchus sappho
- †Saratogia
  - †Saratogia type locality for species – informal
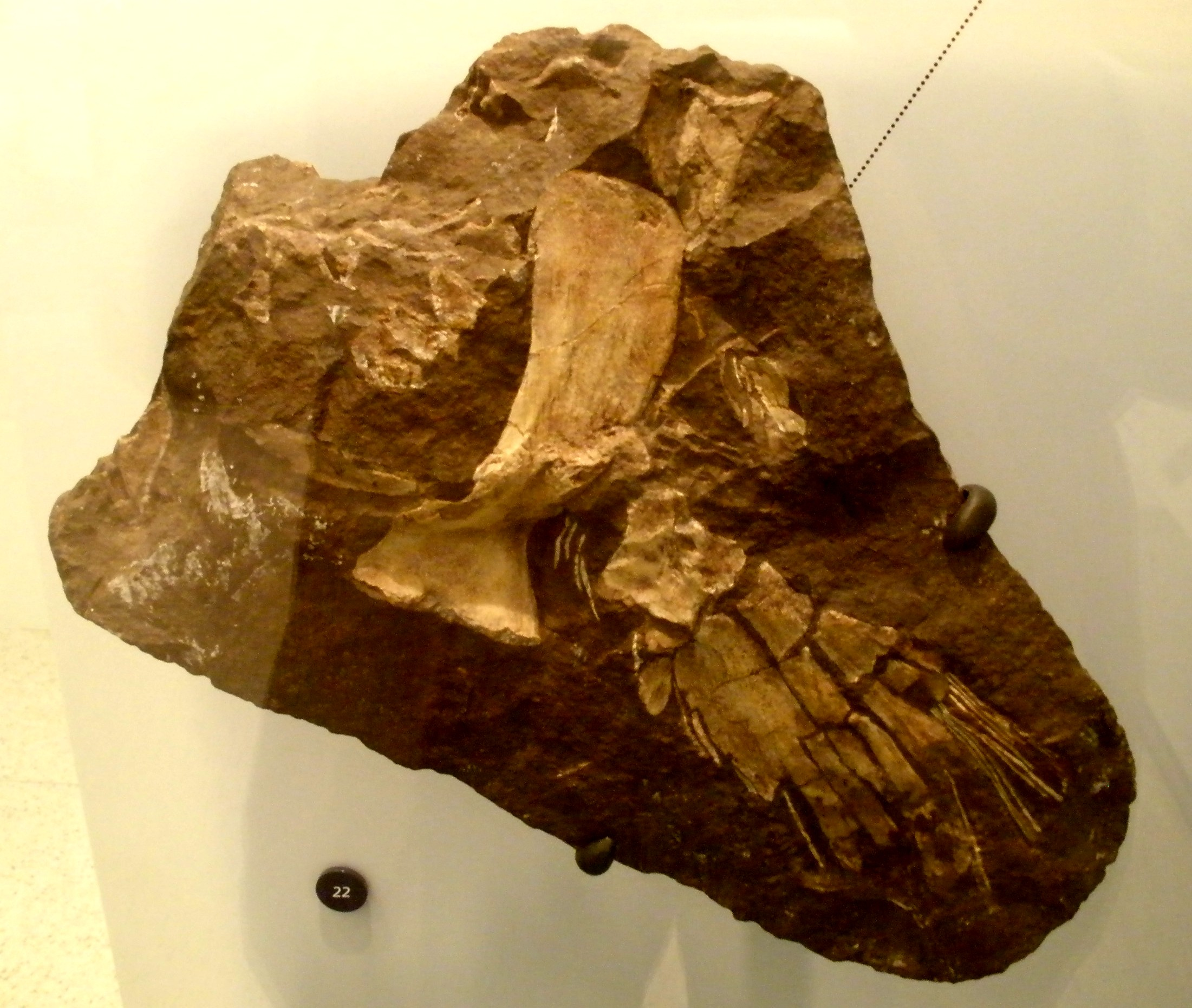
- Fossilized fin of the Devonian lobe-finned fish Sauripterus
  †Sauripterus
  - †Sauripterus taylori
- †Schaefferia (Paleozoic plant) – or unidentified comparable form
- †Schizoblatta
  - †Schizoblatta pennsylvanica – type locality for species
- †Schizodiscus
  - †Schizodiscus capsa
- †Schizodus
  - †Schizodus cuneatus
- †Schizophoria
  - †Schizophoria amanaensis
  - †Schizophoria impressa
  - †Schizophoria striatula
- †Schuchertella
  - †Schuchertella parva
  - †Schuchertella variabilis
- †Schuchertia
  - †Schuchertia laxata
- †Sciadophyton
- †Secarisporites
- †Selkirkia
- †Septopora
- †Serracaris
- †Shansiella
  - †Shansiella carbonaria
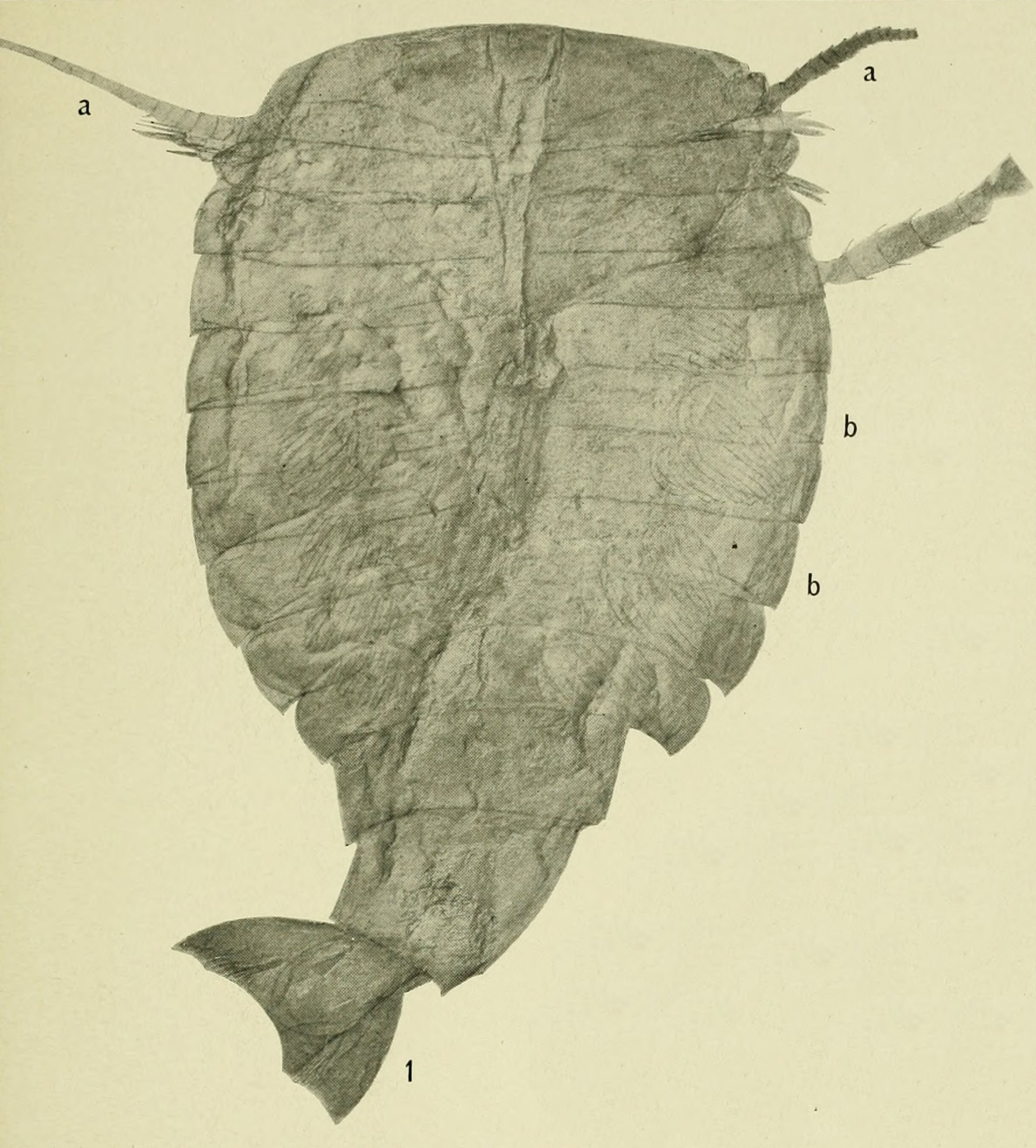
- Fossils of the Cambrian arthropod Sidneyia
  †Sidneyia
- †Sigillaria
- †Sinochonetes
  - †Sinochonetes lepidus
- †Sinuites
  - †Sinuites cancellatus
- †Soleniscus
  - †Soleniscus primogenia
  - †Soleniscus typicus
- †Solenochilus
  - †Solenochilus collectum
- †Solenopleurella
  - †Solenopleurella elatifrons – type locality for species
  - †Solenopleurella transversa – type locality for species
- †Solutotherates
  - †Solutotherates analis – type locality for species
- †Sowerbyella
  - †Sowerbyella plicatellus
  - †Sowerbyella rugosa
- †Spathognathodus
- †Spelaeotriletes
  - †Spelaeotriletes crustalus
  - †Spelaeotriletes resolutus
- †Sphenomylacris
  - †Sphenomylacris singularis – type locality for species
- †Spinatrypa
  - †Spinatrypa hystrix
  - †Spinatrypa spinosa
- †Spinocyrtia
  - †Spinocyrtia girtyi
  - †Spinocyrtia granulosa
  - †Spinocyrtia macbridei
- †Spinulicosta
  - †Spinulicosta spinulicosta
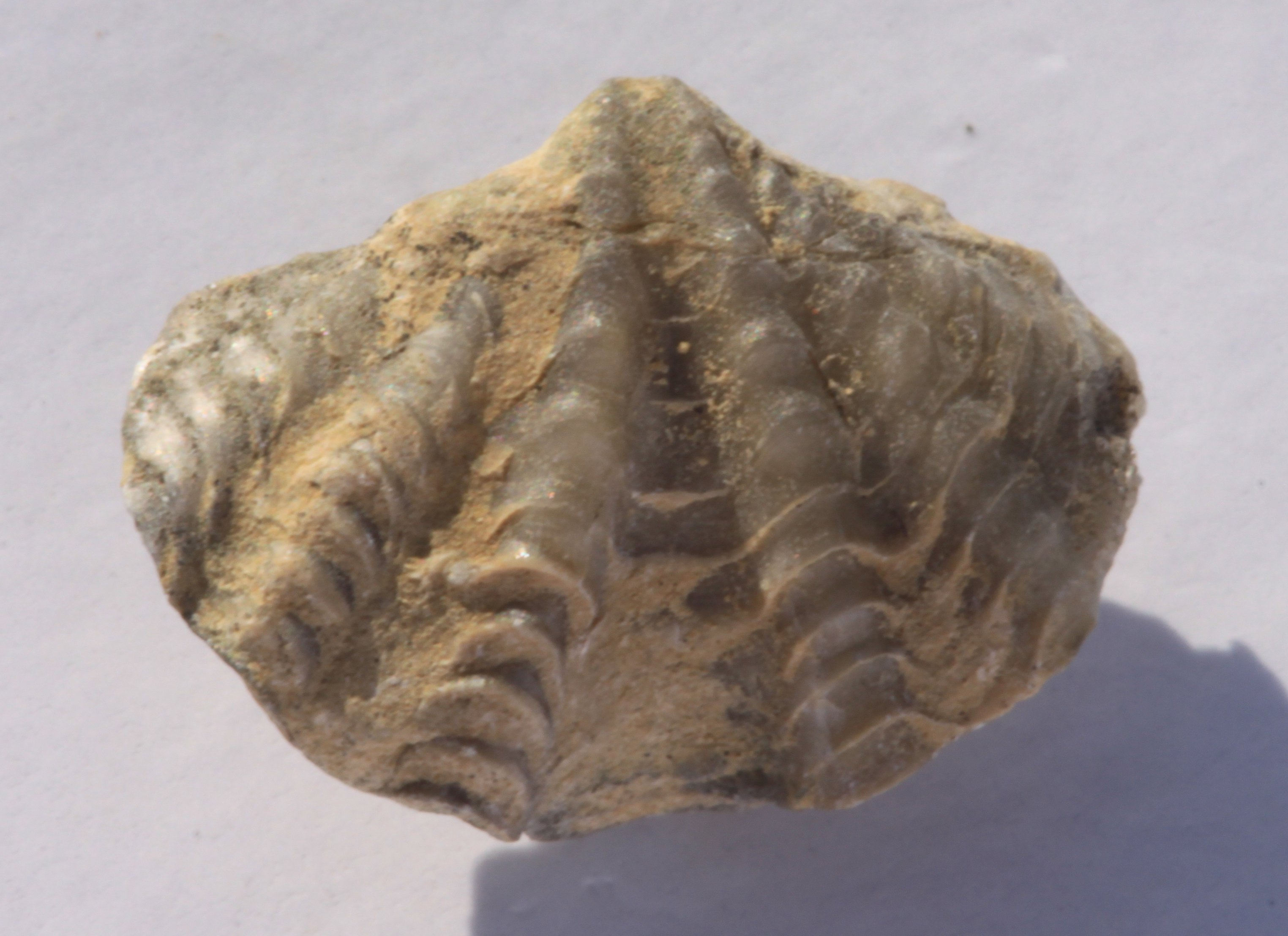
- Fossilized shell of the Late Ordovician-Late Triassic brachiopod Spirifer
  †Spirifer
  - †Spirifer disjunctus
  - †Spirifer varicosa
- †Spongophylloides
- †Spyroceras
  - †Spyroceras nuntium
- †Stauromatidium
  - †Stauromatidium marylandicum
- †Stemtonoceras
  - †Stemtonoceras elongatum
- †Stenomylacris – type locality for genus
  - †Stenomylacris elegans – type locality for species
- †Stereolasma
- †Stittaspis
  - †Stittaspis loria – type locality for species
- †Straparollus
- †Striacoceras
  - †Striacoceras typum – tentative report
- †Strobeus
  - †Strobeus paludinaeformis
- †Strophalosia
  - †Strophalosia truncata
- †Stropheodonta
  - †Stropheodonta demissa
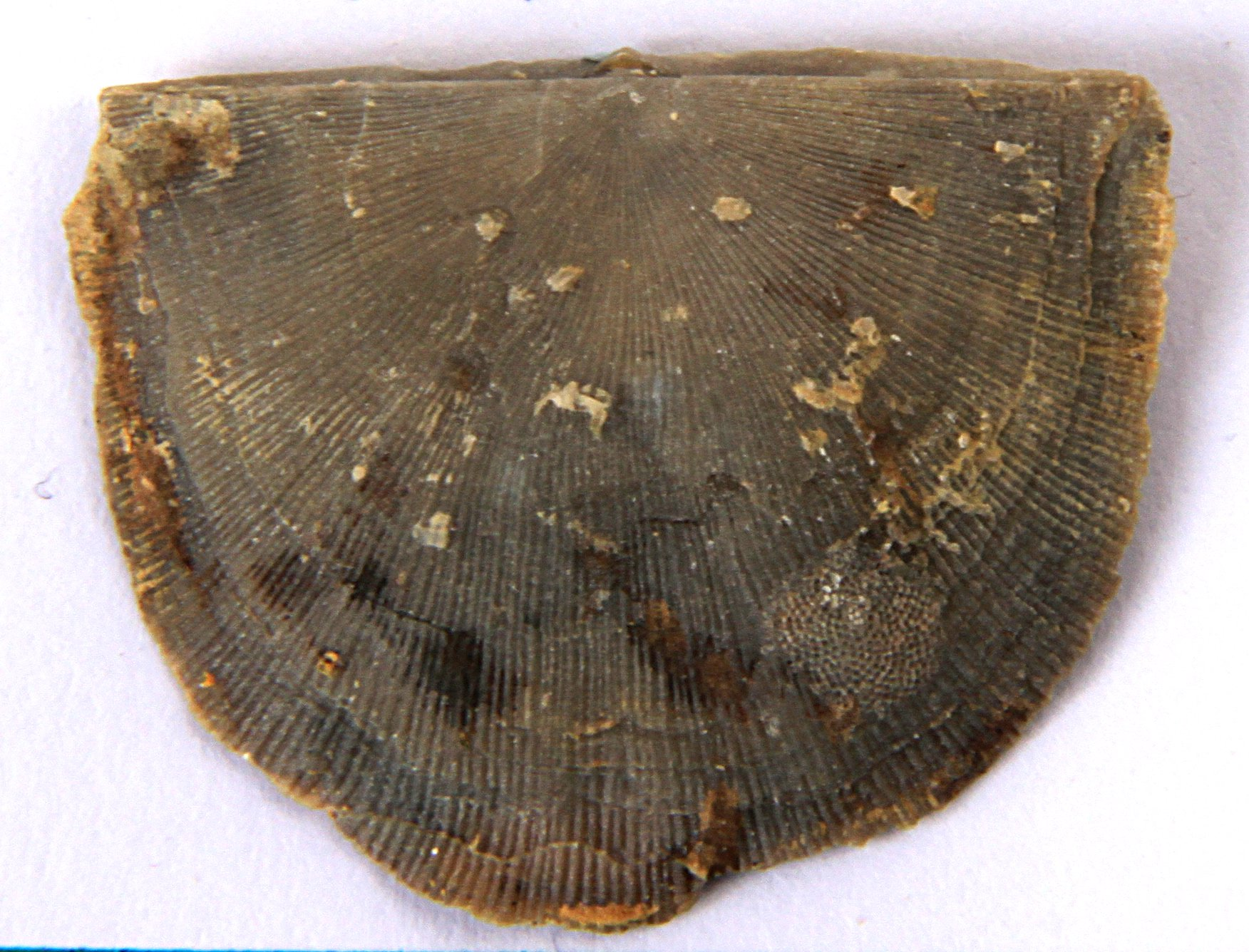
- Fossilized shell of the Ordovician-Silurian brachiopod Strophomena
  †Strophomena
- †Styliolina
  - †Styliolina bellistriata
  - †Styliolina fissurella
- †Subrensselandia
  - †Subrensselandia claypolii
- †Sulcocephalus
  - †Sulcocephalus candidus
  - †Sulcocephalus granulosus
- †Sulcoretepora
  - †Sulcoretepora incisurata
  - †Sulcoretepora sinuosa – or unidentified comparable form
- †Swataria – type locality for genus
  - †Swataria derstleri – type locality for species
- †Syntrophina
- †Syscioblatta
  - †Syscioblatta allegheniensis – type locality for species
  - †Syscioblatta pennsylvanica – type locality for species

== T ==
- †Tabulipora
- †Taeniaster
  - †Taeniaster maximus
- †Taenicephalus
  - †Taenicephalus shumardi
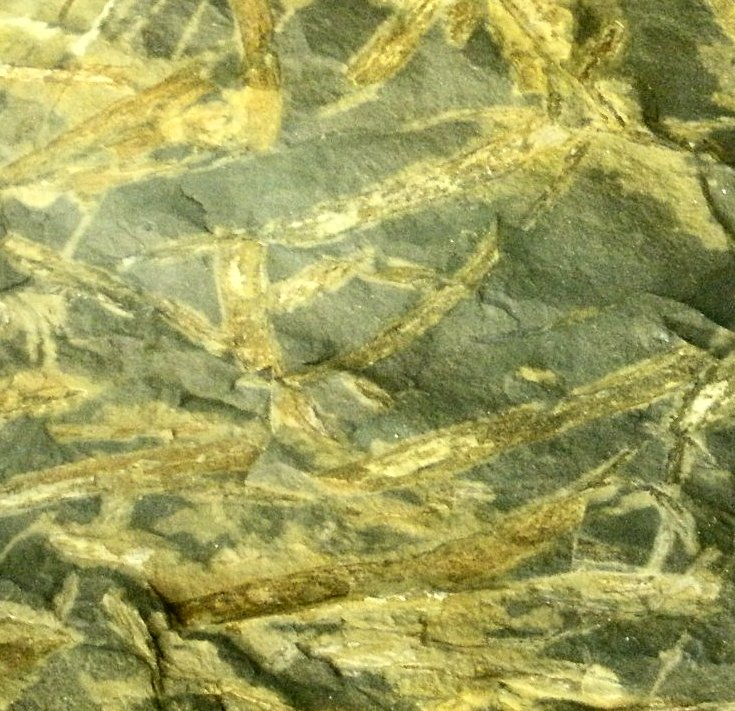
- Fossils of the Devonian plant stem morphogenus Taeniocrada
  †Taeniocrada
- †Taeniopora
  - †Taeniopora exigua
- †Taonurus
- †Tellinopsis
- †Temnocheilus
  - †Temnocheilus crassus
- †Tentaculites
  - †Tentaculites attenuatus
- †Tetradella
  - †Tetradella multipustulosa
- †Tetraxylopteris
- †Thlipsura
  - †Thlipsura ultimata
- †Thlipsurella
  - †Thlipsurella semipunctata
- †Titanodictya
  - †Titanodictya jucunda – type locality for species
- †Titusvillia – type locality for genus
  - †Titusvillia drakei – type locality for species
- †Trepospira
  - †Trepospira illinoisensis
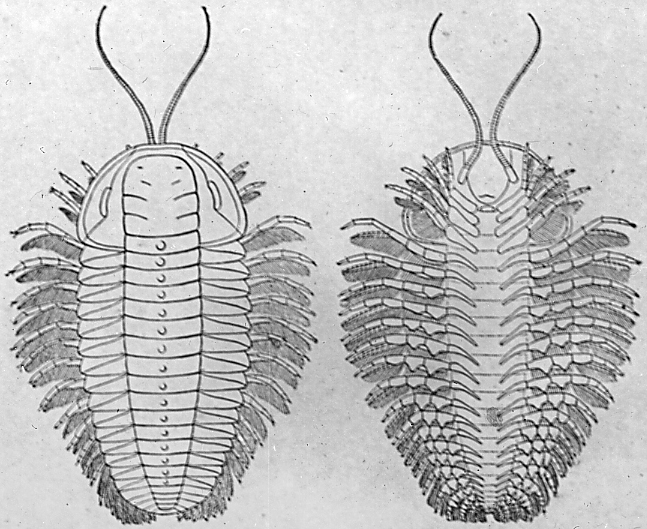
- Restoration showing the top (left) and underside of the Late Ordovician trilobite Triarthrus
  †Triarthrus
  - †Triarthrus becki
- †Tricrepicephalus
  - †Tricrepicephalus arcuatus – type locality for species
- †Trimerus
  - †Trimerus dekayi
- †Triphyllopteris
  - †Triphyllopteris biloba – type locality for species
  - †Triphyllopteris latilobata – type locality for species
  - †Triphyllopteris latilobatus
  - †Triphyllopteris lescuriana
- †Trocophyllum
  - †Trocophyllum breviinternodium
- †Tropidoleptus
  - †Tropidoleptus carinatus
- †Truncalosia
  - †Truncalosia truncata
- †Truncatiramus – now regarded as a jr. synonym of Erettopterus
- †Tryplasma
- †Tubulella
- †Tuzoia
- †Tylothyris
  - †Tylothyris mesacostalis
  - †Tylothyris pauliformis

== U ==
- †Ulrichia
  - †Ulrichia elongata
  - †Ulrichia spinifera
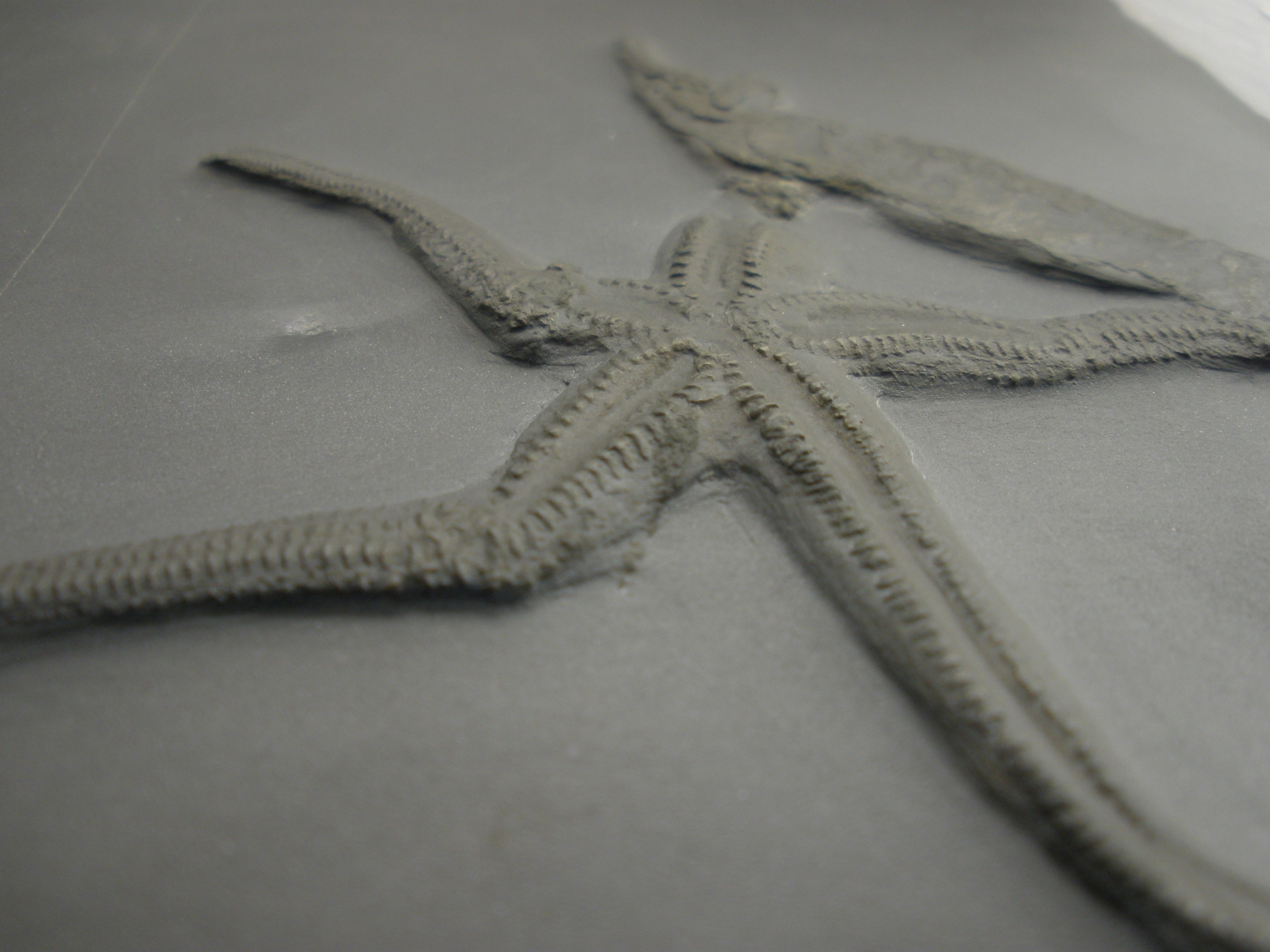
- Fossil of the Ordovician-Devonian sea star Urasterella
  †Urasterella
  - †Urasterella pulchella

== V ==
- †Vallatisporites
  - †Vallatisporites pusilites
- †Vernonaspis
- †Verrucosisporites
  - †Verrucosisporites nitidus
  - †Verrucosisporites scurrus
- †Vinella

== W ==
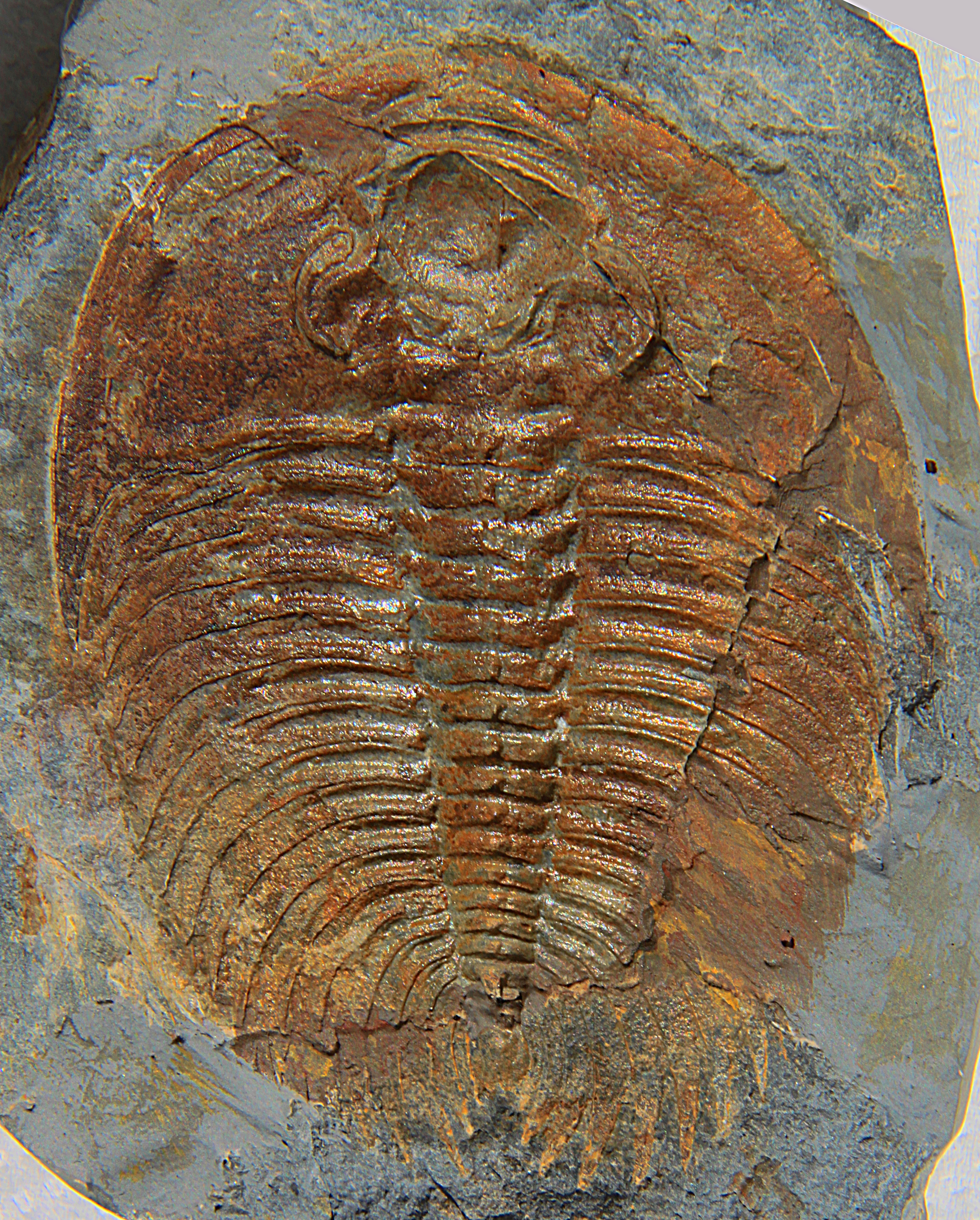
- Fossil of the Cambrian trilobite Wanneria
  †Wanneria
  - †Wanneria walcottana
- †Warrenella
  - †Warrenella laevis
- †Welleraspis
  - †Welleraspis newfoundlandensis – or unidentified comparable form
- †Whidbornella
  - †Whidbornella lachrymosa
- †Wilkingia
  - †Wilkingia terminale
- †Worthenia
  - †Worthenia tabulata

== X ==
- †Xenoblatta
  - †Xenoblatta pennsylvanica – type locality for species
- †Xenocheilos
  - †Xenocheilos spineum

== Y ==
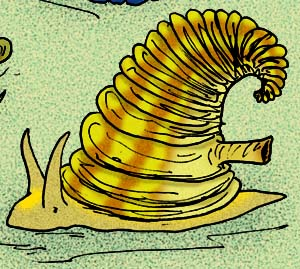
- Life restoration of the probable Cambrian mollusc Yochelcionella
  †Yochelcionella
  - †Yochelcionella americana – type locality for species
  - †Yochelcionella chinensis
  - †Yochelcionella greenlandica
- †Yorkia
  - †Yorkia wanneri

== Z ==
- †Zaphrenthis
- †Zelophyllia
- †Zelophyllum
- †Zygospira
