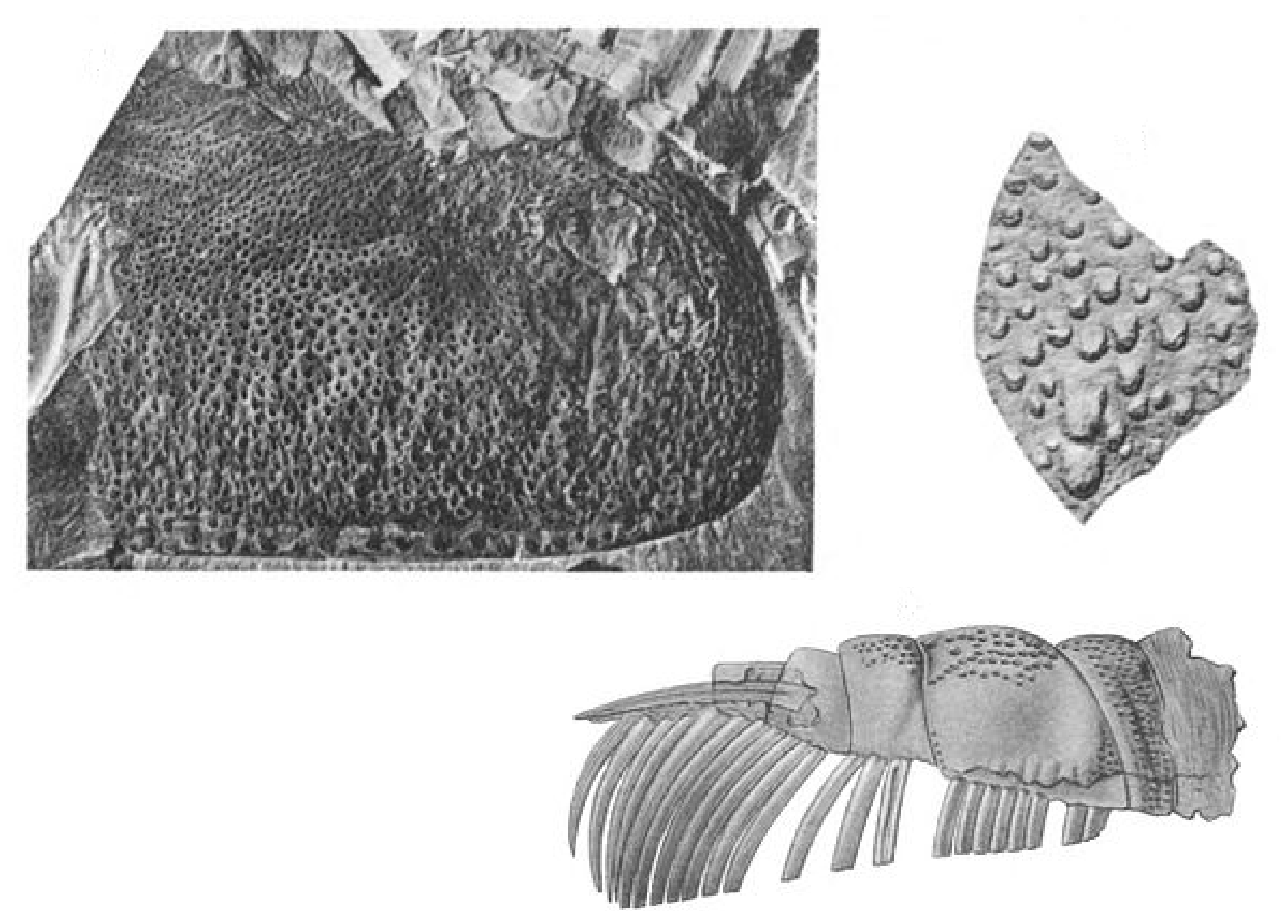
- The type material of E. clevelandi: a body segment (top; with zoomed-in detail of the integument) and an endognathary appendage (bottom)

Scientific classification
- Kingdom: Animalia
- Phylum: Arthropoda
- Subphylum: Chelicerata
- Order: †Eurypterida
- Superfamily: †Carcinosomatoidea
- Family: †Megalograptidae
- Genus: †Echinognathus; Walcott, 1882
- Species: †E. clevelandi

Binomial name
- †Echinognathus clevelandi Walcott, 1882

= Echinognathus =

Echinognathus Temporal range: Katian, 453–445.2 Ma

Extinct genus of arthropods

Echinognathus is a genus of eurypterid, an extinct group of aquatic arthropods. The type and only species of Echinognathus, E. clevelandi, is known from deposits of Late Ordovician age in the United States. The generic name is derived from the Neo-Latin echino- ("spiny") and the Greek gnáthos ("jaw"), in reference to a spiny endognathary (used to handle food) appendage part of the fossil type material.

Echinognathus is only known from fragmentary fossil material, consisting of body segments, an appendage used to handle food and possibly other body segments. The genus is distinguished from other eurypterids by the large number of elongated and curved spines, blade-like in life, on its limbs. Initially assumed to represent a species of Eurypterus, these distinguishing features were quickly noticed and deemed important enough to designate Echinognathus as its own genus. With some additional fossil assigned to Echinognathus in the early 20th century, the genus was noted to be similar to Megalograptus, another eurypterid with spiny limbs. In 1955, Echinognathus and Megalograptus were placed into their own taxonomic family of eurypterids, the Megalograptidae.

Based on the proportions of other eurypterids, Echinognathus would have been a medium-sized predator, reaching approximately 45 centimeters (17.7 in) in length. The spines on its limbs were presumably used for active prey capture, securing food and carrying it to the mouth. The fossils of Echinognathus are known from what was once marine environments, and it lived alongside a fauna including graptolites, brachiopods, cephalopods and trilobites.

== Description ==
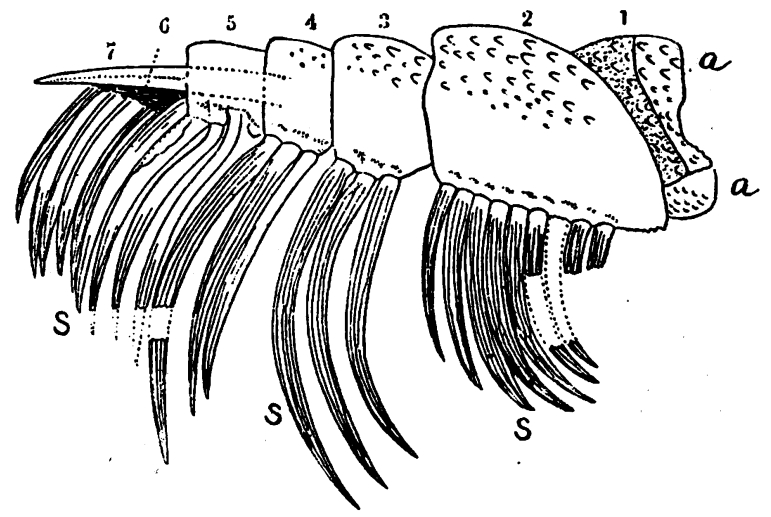
Restoration of the endognathary appendage of E. clevelandi

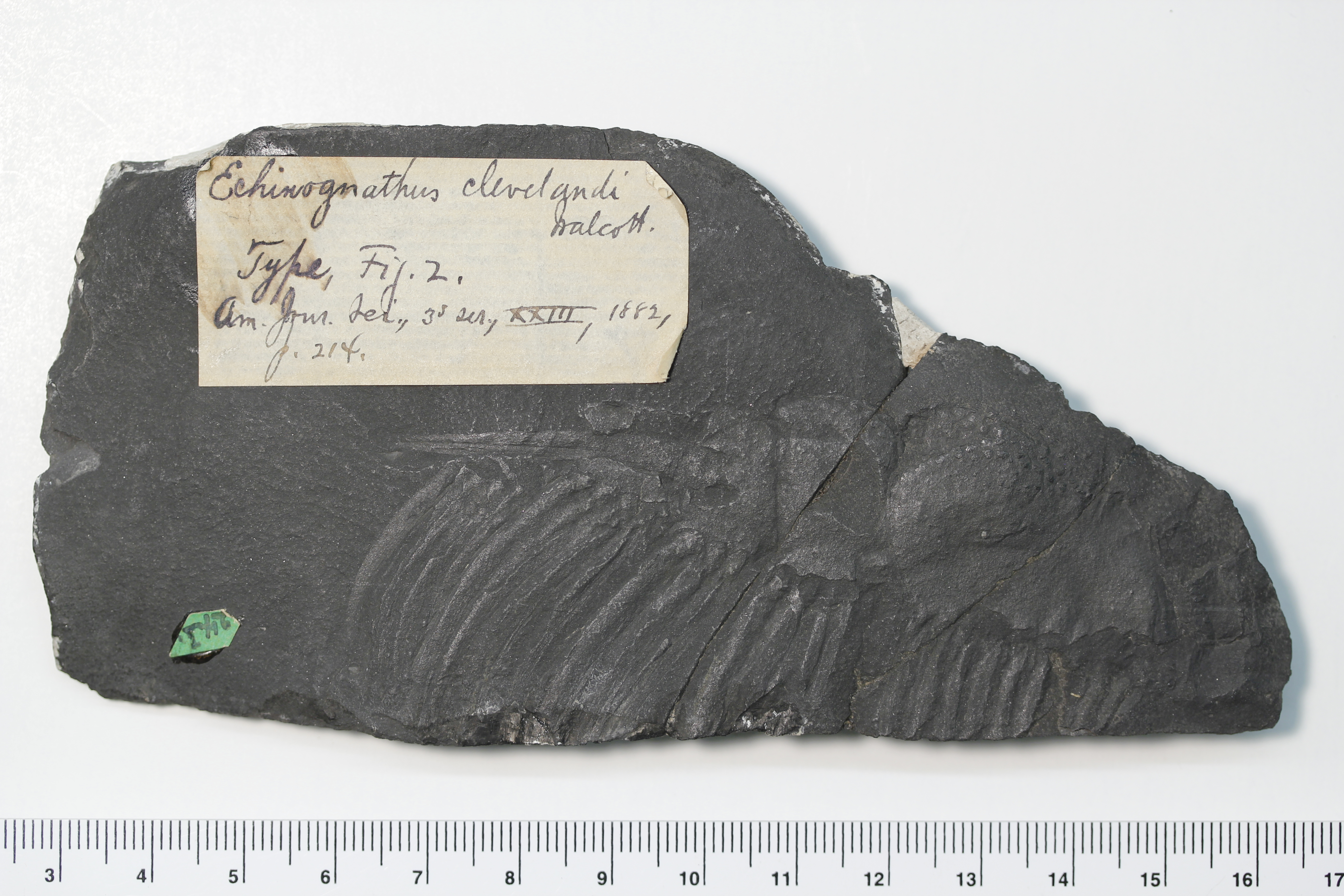
Fossil of the endognathary appendage

Echinognathus is only known from fragmentary fossil remains. It was a medium-sized megalograptid eurypterid, reaching approximately 45 centimeters (17.7 in) in length. On account of being known from such fragmentary remains, most of the body of Echinognathus is unknown. Based on the related Megalograptus, it is possible that the head was subquadrate (vaguely quadratic) in shape. Echinognathus was probably robustly built.

The most distinguishing feature apparent in the fossil material was the spines of the known endognathary (used to handle food) appendage. The limb was formed by eight or nine joints, most probably eight, six of which were equipped with large, curved and elongated spines. The spines, similar to but also distinct from those of the related Megalograptus, were flattened, had a subtriangular intersection and were distinctly striated (had grooves) longitudinally. In life, they would have had a distinct blade-like appearance.

The body segments of Echinognathus were ornamented with prominent oblong scales, similar in shape to "raindrops running down a windowpane". The metastoma (a large plate located on the underside of the body) of Echinognathus was broad and cordate (heart-shaped) in shape, a feature similar to most eurypterids but differentiating it from Megalograptus, which had a more unique metastoma.

== History of research ==
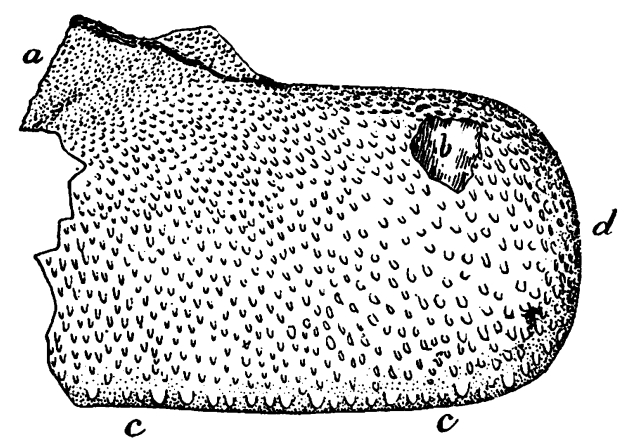
Fragment of a body segment of E. clevelandi, as illustrated by Charles Doolittle Walcott in 1882

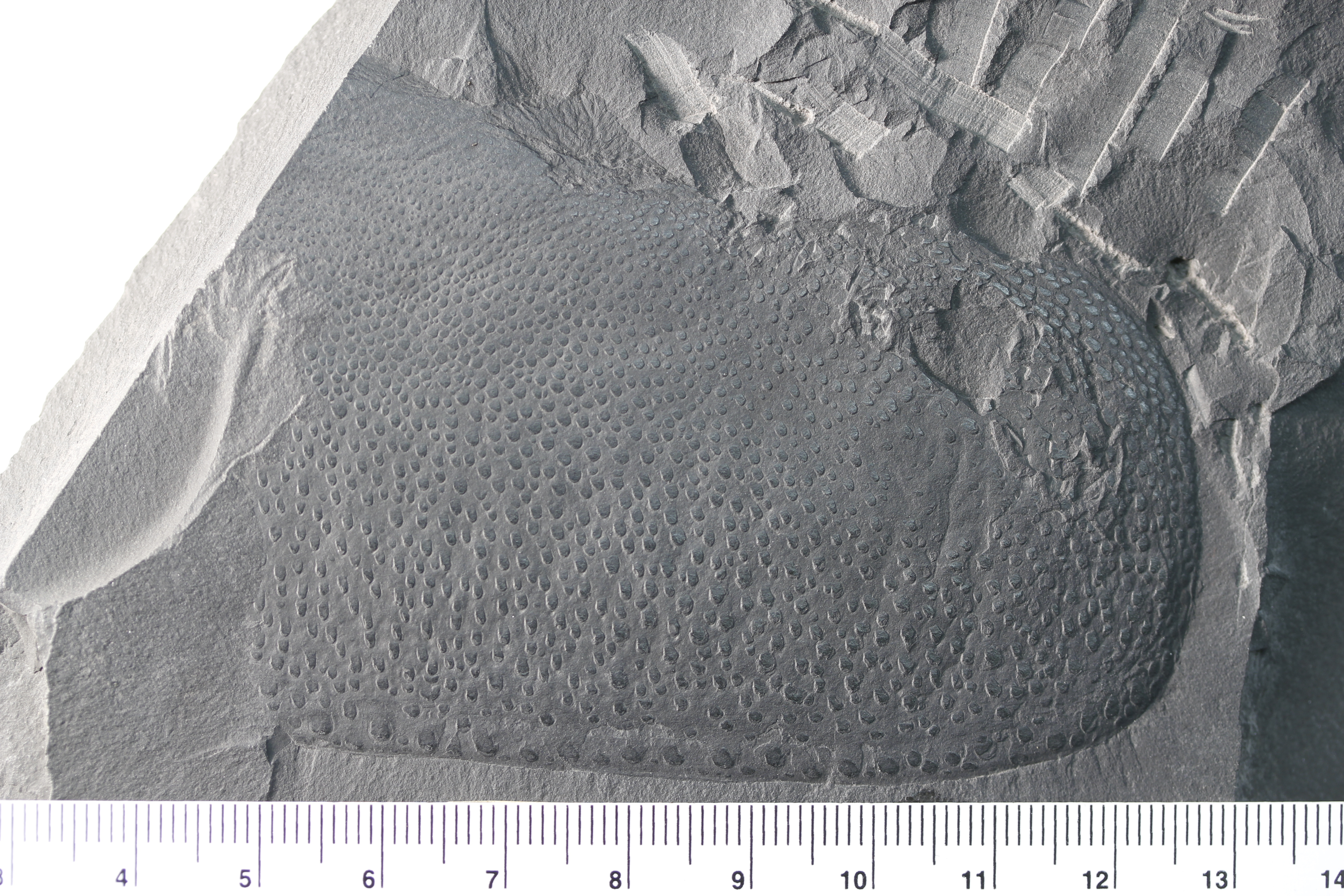
Fossil of the body segment

The type material of Echinognathus clevelandi was first reported in February 1882 by Charles Doolittle Walcott. The fossils were recovered in deposits of Katian (Late Ordovician) age north of Utica, New York by William N. Cleveland, a friend of Walcott. At first, Walcott provisionally referred the fossils to the genus Eurypterus, proposing the species name Eurypterus? clevelandi, the name honoring Cleveland. The fossils consisted of the remains of a large endognathary appendage equipped with intact fossil spines, and part of a body segment. Later that same year, Walcott formally described the fossils. Because comparisons with other known eurypterids yielded few similarities, Walcott named Echinognathus clevelandi as a new genus and species, the genus name referring to the spiny endognathary appendage. Etymologically, the name derives from the Neo-Latin echino- ("spiny") and the Greek gnáthos ("jaw"). The main distinguishing feature of the Echinognathus fossils, as noted by Walcott, was the long and curved spines of the appendage.

Further fossils from the type locality of E. clevelandi were referred to Echinognathus in the early 20th century by John Mason Clarke and Rudolf Ruedemann (and later Ruedemann alone), who described several fragments of body segments, and mentioned a larger collection of unpublished fragments, in 1912 and 1926. Fragments of a spine, or possibly the telson (the final body segment, often in the shape of a spike), were referred to Echinognathus by Ruedemann in 1916. Ruedemann's spine/telson fragments were covered in scales and not striations (as the spines of the type specimen were), and as such he noted that they might either belong to a new, second species of Echinognathus, or that the striations of the spines broke up into scales as Echinognathus matured. The spine was suggested by Kenneth E. Caster and Erik N. Kjellesvig-Waering in 1964 to instead belong to Megalograptus.

== Classification ==
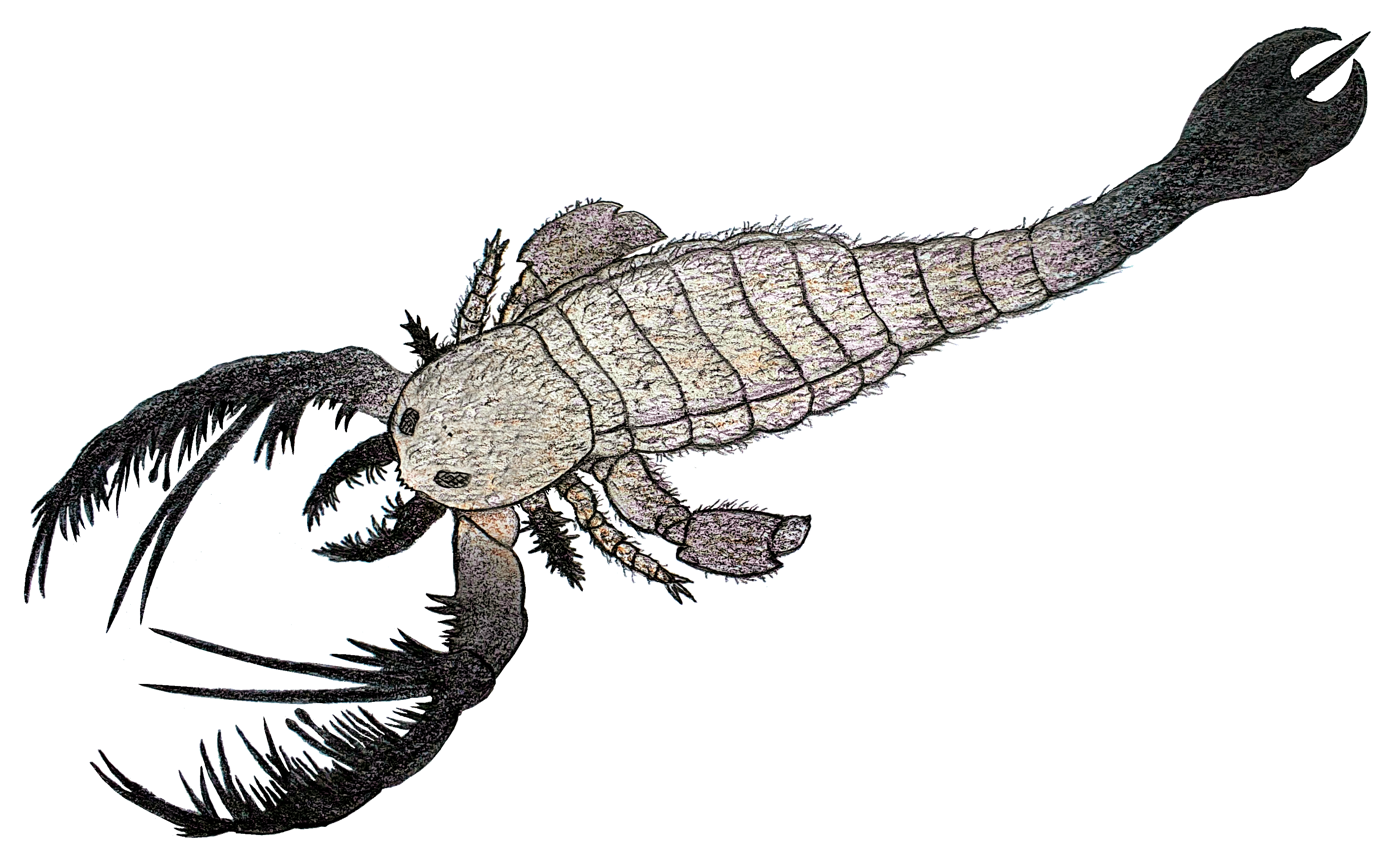
Reconstruction of Megalograptus, the closest relative of Echinognathus

In his original description of Echinognathus, Walcott made no assessment of the relationship between the genus and other eurypterids. In Clarke's and Ruedemann's 1912 The Eurypterida of New York, Echinognathus was tentatively associated with the genus Stylonurus, particularly the subgenus Ctenopterus (later raised to a full, distinct, genus). The association was made since Echinognathus had so many paired spines on its appendage, most known eurypterids at the time, with the exception of Stylonurus and some others, only having one pair per segment. The continuous series of spines was noted to specifically be characteristic of Ctenopterus. The blade-like spines and the striations on the spines were also noted to be characteristics also seen in Ctenopterus. In The Eurypterida of New York, August Foerste compared the Echinognathus fossils to those of Megalograptus, also fragmentarily known at the time, and concluded that the two were likely closely related, if not congeneric. The discovery of more Megalograptus fossils, and more fragmentary fossils of Echinognathus, later in the 20th century allowed for the two to be firmly established as distinct, but closely related genera.

In 1934, Leif Størmer classified Megalograptus and Echinognathus, together with the genera Mixopterus and Carcinosoma, into the family Carcinosomatidae. The taxonomy was amended by Erik N. Kjellesvig-Waering in Størmer's 1955 Treatise on Invertebrate Paleontology, wherein Mixopterus was transferred to its own family, the Mixopteridae, and Megalograptus and Echinognathus were also placed within their own family, the Megalograptidae. Though the taxonomic position of this family has been contested historically, phylogenetic analyses support the Megalograptidae as grouped with the Carcinosomatidae and Mixopteridae in the superfamily Carcinosomatoidea. The cladogram below is simplified from the results of a 2015 phylogenetic analysis by James Lamsdell and colleagues, collapsed to only display the Carcinosomatoidea.

- Carcinosomatoidea
  - - Megalograptidae
      - Pentecopterus decorahensis
      - - Echinognathus clevelandi
        - - Megalograptus williamsae
          - - Megalograptus ohioensis
            - Megalograptus welchi
    - - Mixopteridae
        - Lanarkopterus dolichoschelus
        - - Mixopterus kiaeri
          - Mixopterus multispinosus
      - Carcinosomatidae
        - Holmipterus suecicus
        - Rhinocarcinosoma vaningeni
        - - - Carcinosoma newlini
            - Carcinosoma libertyi
          - - Eusarcana acrocephalus
            - Eusarcana scorpionis

== Paleoecology ==
Echinognathus is known from marine deposits. The spines on the appendages were initially hypothesized by Walcott to have been related to the branchial (i. e. respiratory) system. Walcott noted that it was "not apparent" that they were used to secure food or carry it to the mouth of the animal, the only other viable hypothesis. Based on the related Megalograptus, the second hypothesis, that the spines of Echinognathus were used for active prey capture and to move food to the mouth, is more likely. There were numerous other organisms present at the fossil site where the Echinognathus fossils were found, including graptolites Mastigograptus, Geniculograptus, Orthograptus and Climacograptus, orthocerid cephalopod Geisonoceras, lingulid brachiopod Leptolobus, rhynchonellatan brachiopod Camarotoechia and trilobite Triarthrus.

== See also ==
- List of eurypterid genera
- Timeline of eurypterid research
