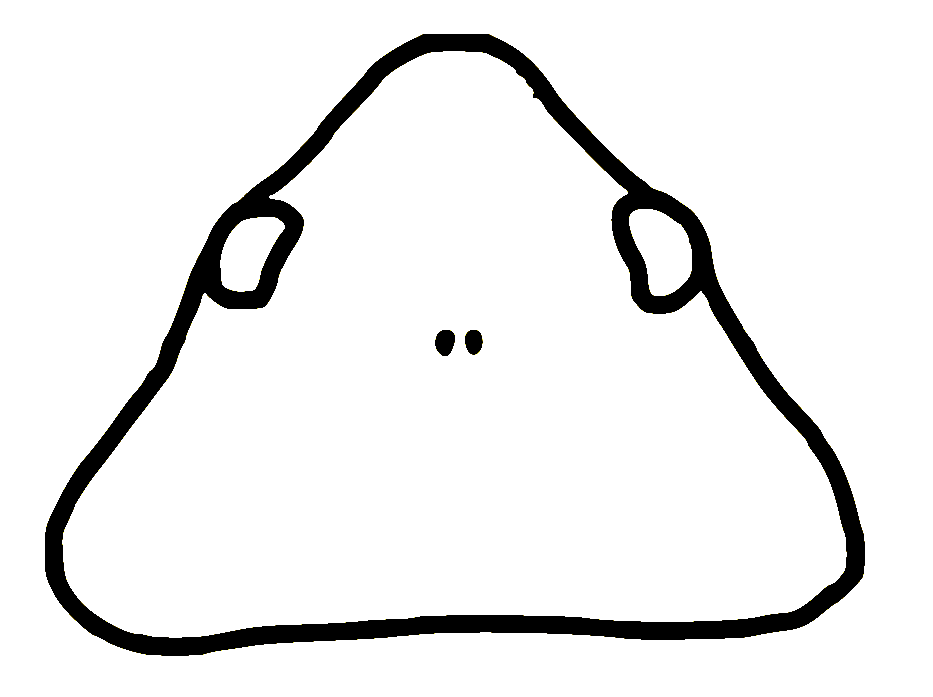
- Illustration of the carapace of E. batrachophthalmus

Scientific classification
- Kingdom: Animalia
- Phylum: Arthropoda
- Subphylum: Chelicerata
- Order: †Eurypterida
- Superfamily: †Carcinosomatoidea
- Family: †Carcinosomatidae
- Genus: †Eocarcinosoma; Caster & Kjellesvig-Waering, 1964
- Species: †E. batrachophthalmus

Binomial name
- †Eocarcinosoma batrachophthalmus Caster & Kjellesvig-Waering, 1964

= Eocarcinosoma =

Eocarcinosoma Temporal range: Ashgillian, 449–443.8 Ma

Extinct genus of arthropods

Eocarcinosoma is a genus of eurypterid, an extinct group of aquatic arthropods. The type and only species of Eocarcinosoma, E. batrachophthalmus, is known from deposits of Late Ordovician age in the United States. The generic name is derived from the related genus Carcinosoma, and the Greek eós (ἠώς) meaning 'dawn', referring to the earlier age of the genus compared to other carcinosomatid eurypterids.

Eocarcinosoma is known only from a single specimen, a well-preserved small prosoma (head). In life it would have been a very small eurypterid, given that the head measures just 2.05 centimetres (0.8 in) in length. The main distinguishing features from other carcinosomatids were the eyes being placed on the margins of the carapace (head plate) and the head being more triangular in shape than in its later relatives. Although initially believed to be an adult given the relatively small size of the eyes, some researchers believe Eocarcinosoma to represent a juvenile specimen of the eurypterid Megalograptus.

== Description ==
Eocarcinosoma was a small carcinosomatid eurypterid. Although size estimates of E. batrachophthalmus being as small as 3 centimetres (1.2 in) in length have been published, these are impossible given that the carapace (head plate) of the type specimen measures 2.05 centimetres (0.8 in) in length and is 2.42 centimetres (0.95 in) wide at its widest point.

The carapace of Eocarcinosoma was broadly triangular in shape, slightly wider than it was long. The triangular shape, combined with a downward bend of the frontal margins of the carapace, might have been adaptations towards digging. The compound eyes of Eocarcinosoma, which measured 3.7 millimetres (0.15 in) long and 1.5 millimetres (0.06 in) wide were prominent and roughly reniform (shaped like beans or kidneys), and located on the margin of the carapace. Slightly behind the eyes and placed in the centre of the carapace were the ocelli (light-sensitive simple eyes), which were raised on a small and rounded ocellar mound.

Eocarcinosoma can be distinguished from other carcinosomatids, such as Carcinosoma and Eusarcana, by its marginally placed and kidney-shaped compound eyes and its head shape being more triangular than those of its relatives. Unlike later carcinosomatids, the carapace of Eocarcinosoma also apparently lacked any ormanentation of scales.

== History of research ==
Eocarcinosoma batrachophthalmus was described in 1964 by Kenneth E. Caster and Erik N. Kjellesvig-Waering, based on a well-preserved prosoma (head) from Ashgillian-age (Late Ordovician) deposits alongside the Ohio River road (U.S. Route 52), approximately 14.5 kilometres (9 miles) north of Manchester, Ohio. The fossil location is the same as the type locality of the eurypterid Megalograptus ohioensis. The specimen was referred to the Carcinosomatidae by Caster and Kjellesvig-Waering without explanation, and named as a distinct genus and species on account of the features separating it from other carcinosomatids. The name Eocarcinosoma is derived from the Greek word eós (ἠώς) meaning 'dawn', and the related genus Carcinosoma. The type specimen, consisting of a part and counterpart (the two matching halves of a compression fossil) and given the designation 24147 A and B, was deposited to the Geological Museum of the University of Cincinnati.

Caster and Kjellesvig-Waering also suggested that three other Ordovician carcinosomatid eurypterid species from New York State, previously referred to the genus Eusarcus (a synonym of Eusarcana) – E. breviceps, E. ruedemanni and E. triangulatus – could be referred to Eocarcinosoma. These species, noted by Caster and Kjellesvig-Waering as being based on poorly preserved fossil material, were deemed to be based on pseudofossils, and thus invalid, by Victor P. Tollerton in 2003, an assessment retained by later researchers. The only species of Eocarcinosoma presently considered valid is the type species, E. batrachophthalmus.

Although Kjellesvig-Waering noted in 1964 that the small eyes of the type specimen indicates that it was an adult, the possibility that the specimen represented a juvenile Megalograptus was noted in 2004 by Simon J. Braddy, Victor P. Tollerton, Patrick R. Racheboeuf and Roger Schallreuter. Though the genus was provisionally accepted as reliable, the authors wrote that the specimen required restudy. The possibility that it may be a juvenile Megalograptus was again mentioned by James C. Lamsdell and Braddy in a 2009 study.

== Classification ==
Rhinocarcinosoma is classified as part of the family Carcinosomatidae, a family within the superfamily Carcinosomatoidea, alongside the genera Carcinosoma, Rhinocarcinosoma, Eusarcana and possibly Holmipterus. Eocarcinosoma is typically excluded from phylogenetic analyses due to being based only on a small carapace. The cladogram below follows a 1983 cladogram by Roy E. Plotnick, simplified to only display the Carcinosomatoidea.

- Carcinosomatoidea
  - - - Carcinosoma
      - Paracarcinosoma (Note: Paracarcinosoma is a junior synonym of Eusarcana.)
    - - Eocarcinosoma
      - Rhinocarcinosoma
      - - Lanarkopterus
        - - Mixopterus
          - Echinognathus
          - - Megalograptus
            - - Holmipterus
              - Salteropterus (Note: Salteropterus is now classified within the Slimonidae family.)

== Palaeoecology ==
Carcinosomatid eurypterids such as Eocarcinosoma were among the most marine eurypterids, with the fossil deposits that yielded Eocarcinsoma at one point having been a marginal marine (influenced by both salt and fresh water, such as a lagoon or delta) environment. The Eocarcinosoma type specimen was found alongside hundreds of specimens, most fragmentary, of the larger eurypterid Megalograptus ohioensis. Also present were species of trilobites and scolecodonts.

== See also ==
- List of eurypterid genera
- Timeline of eurypterid research
