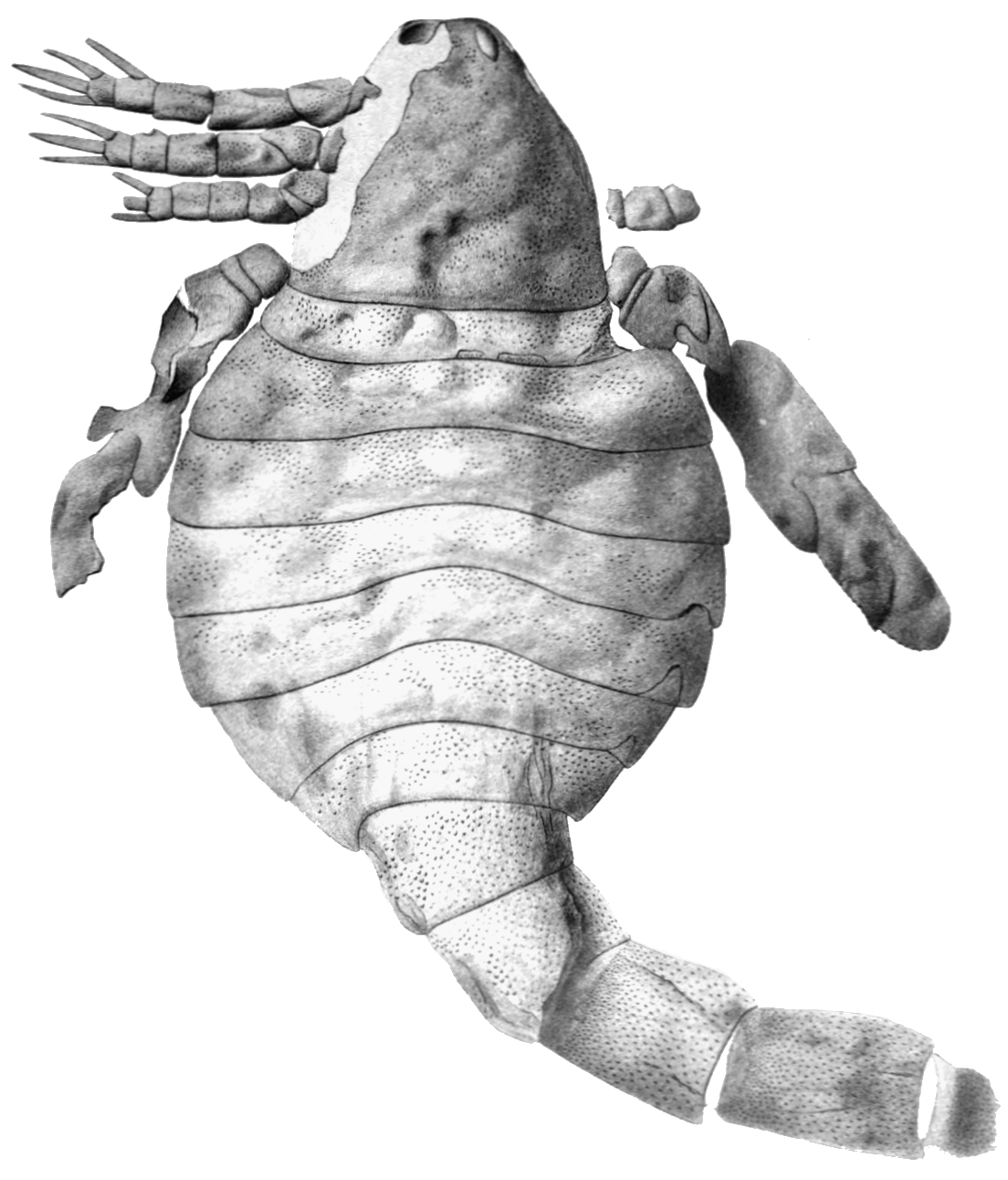
- Fossil of Eusarcana

Scientific classification
- Kingdom: Animalia
- Phylum: Arthropoda
- Subphylum: Chelicerata
- Order: †Eurypterida
- Infraorder: †Diploperculata
- Superfamily: †Carcinosomatoidea
- Family: †Carcinosomatidae; Størmer, 1934

Type species
- †Carcinosoma newlini (Claypole, 1890)

Genera
- †Carcinosoma; †Cruinnopterus; †Eusarcana; †Holmipterus?; †Rhinocarcinosoma; †Tigrisopterus

= Carcinosomatidae =

Carcinosomatidae Temporal range: Early Ordovician - Early Devonian

Extinct family of arthropods

Carcinosomatidae (the name deriving from the type genus Carcinosoma, meaning "crab body") is a family of eurypterids, an extinct group of aquatic arthropods. They were members of the superfamily Carcinosomatoidea, also named after Carcinosoma. Fossils of carcinosomatids have been found in North America, Africa, Europe and Asia, the family possibly having achieved a worldwide distribution, and range in age from the Early Ordovician to the Early Devonian. They were among the most marine eurypterids, known almost entirely from marine environments.

Carcinosomatids varied considerably in size, from species only a few centimetres in length to some of the largest known arthropods. The largest carcinosomatid species, Carcinosoma punctatum, reached lengths of at least 2.2 metres (7.2 ft) and rivalled the largest eurypterid of all, Jaekelopterus, in size. Morphologically, carcinosomatids were highly distinct from other eurypterids, known for their powerful and spiny set of forelimbs, a broad and rounded central body and a slender and tubular tail ending in a telson (the posteriormost division of the body) that was typically curved in some way. With these adaptations, the carcinosomatids were quite similar to scorpions, and the group may have helped contribute to the common name of eurypterids becoming 'sea scorpions'. The family contains five, possibly six, genera: Carcinosoma, Eusarcana, Rhinocarcinosoma, Cruinnopterus, Tigrisopterus, and possibly the problematic genus Holmipterus.

It is unlikely that the carcinosomatids were strong and active swimmers, given their non-streamlined shape. It is more probable that they were nektobenthic (swimming near the bottom), possibly being top predators (given their size) or scavengers, digging for food or perhaps even burrowing and lying in wait as ambush predators.

== Description ==
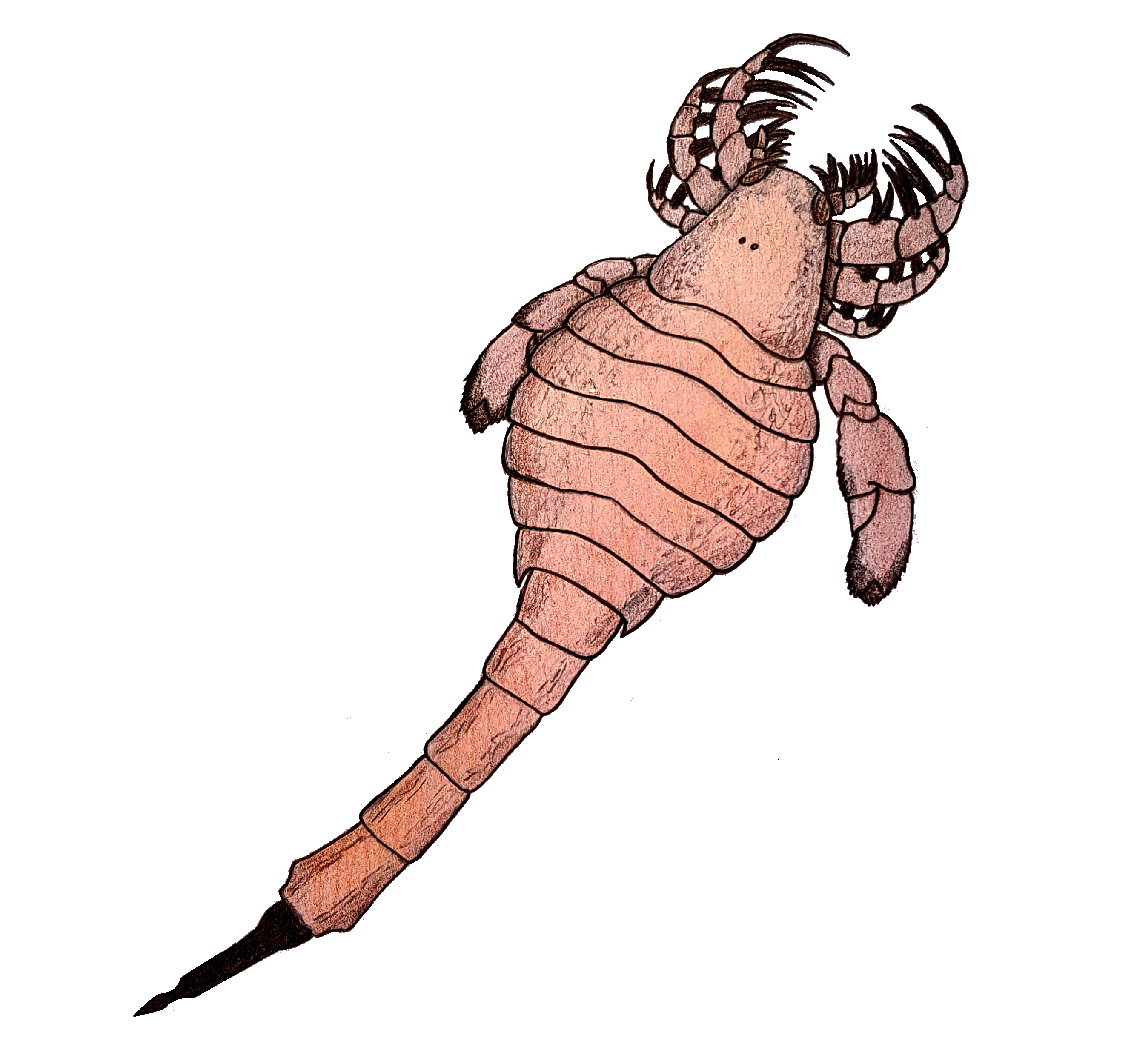
Reconstruction of Carcinosoma

Carcinosomatid eurypterids differed considerably in size depending on the genus and species, though most species were quite large. The largest species was Carcinosoma punctatum at 2.2 metres (7.2 ft), one of the largest eurypterids of all, with some specimens suggesting that it may even have reached lengths of 2.5 metres (8.2 ft), rivalling Jaekelopterus, the largest eurypterid, in size. The smallest carcinosomatid species was Eusarcana obesus, at 4 centimetres (1.5 in) in length. (Note: The largest fossil specimens of the species Rhinocarcinosoma cicerops are also 4 centimetres in length, but the known fossils represent juvenile specimens. Eocarcinosoma batrachophthalmus was also very small, but it would have exceeded 4 centimetres in length given that its head was 2.05 centimetres (0.8 in) long. It is also possible that Eusarcana obesus is a juvenile form of the species Carcinosoma scorpioides, in which case Eocarcinosoma batrachophthalmus would be the smallest carcinosomatid.)

Morphologically, the carcinosomatids were highly distinct among the eurypterids. They were swimming eurypterids (belonging to the suborder Eurypterina), with large swimming paddles, a set of powerful and spiny forelimbs, a broad and rounded preabdomen (central body) and a slender, tubular abdomen, which ended in a telson (the posteriormost division of the body) of variable morphology, often curved. In a sense, the carcinosomatids were rather scorpion-like in appearance, and may have contributed to the common name of eurypterids having become 'sea scorpions'.

There was considerable variety in morphology within the group. The carapace was triangular to subtriangular in shape in all members of the group, through the exact shape could vary. In Rhinocarcinosoma, there was a distinctive, shovel-shaped protrusion at the front of the carapace. The preabdomen was wide in all species, but the width also differed from species to species. The widest species, relatively speaking, was Eusarcana obesus, in which the fourth segment was as wide as the first eight segments combined were long. The spinosity (how many spines) and size of the forelimbs also varied from genus to genus, with the forelimbs of Eusarcana for instance being more powerful than those of Rhinocarcinosoma. The telson varied considerably between genera: in Rhinocarcinosoma it was robust and flattened, curving slightly upwards, in Eusarcana it was cylindrical and fashioned into a sharp, scorpion-like tail spike and in Carcinosoma it was flattened, ending in an expanded and segmented structure unseen in other eurypterids.

== History of research ==
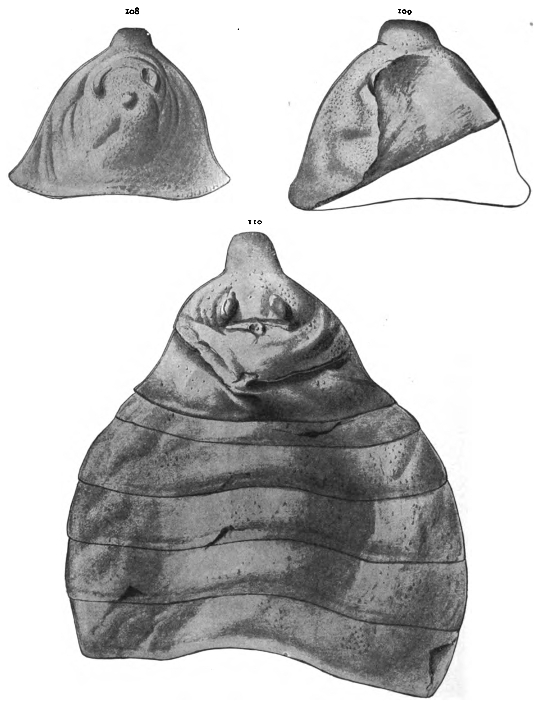
Carapaces of Rhinocarcinosoma, as figured by John Mason Clarke and Rudolf Ruedemann in 1912

The earliest carcinosomatid species to be described was Carcinosoma punctatum, first described under the name Pterygotus punctatus by John William Salter in 1859. The earliest genus later seen as a carcinosomatid to be described was Eusarcus (and its type species E. scorpionis), described by August R. Grote and William Henry Pitt in 1875 based on fossils recovered from the Pridoli-age Buffalo Waterlime of New York State. The description of the genus was lacking and seemingly based only on the outline and shape of the fossil, which led Henry Woodward to refer E. scorpionis to Eurypterus on the grounds that it was similar in shape to Eurypterus punctatus (Pterygotus punctatus having been reclassified as a species of Eurypterus). Unbeknownst to Grote and Pitt, Eusarcus had already been named as a genus of extant (currently living) laniatorid harvestmen of the family Gonyleptidae, in 1833 and as such constituted a preoccupied name. The name being preoccupied went unnoticed until the 1930s. Also described in the late 19th century was the genus Eurysoma, named alongside its type species, E. newlini, by Edward Waller Claypole in 1890. When Claypole discovered later in 1890 that the name was preoccupied by a genus of modern beetles, he replaced the name Eurysoma with the name Carcinosoma.

In 1912, John Mason Clarke and Rudolf Ruedemann declared that the differences between Eusarcus and all related forms of eurypterids were so great that it was "entirely evident" that Eusarcus was distinct from other eurypterids. Clarke and Ruedemann referred several new species to Eusarcus, including new species that would later be seen as species of the genus Rhinocarcinosoma, and also concluded that Eusarcus was sufficiently similar to Carcinosoma to be synonymised. Because Eusarcus had been named earlier than Carcinosoma, the taxonomical laws of priority dictated that Eusarcus would be the name of the taxon.

Eusarcus was finally recognised as a preoccupied name by Leif Størmer in 1934. Størmer substituted the name for the next oldest available non-preoccupied synonym, Carcinosoma. Størmer also introduced the family Carcinosomatidae, initially under the name 'Carcinosomidae', in 1934, to contain the four genera Carcinosoma, Mixopterus, Echinognathus and Megalograptus. The family was amended by Erik N. Kjellesvig-Waering in Størmer's 1955 Treatise on Invertebrate Paleontology, with the name changed to the correct Carcinosomatidae and the genera other than Carcinosoma transferred to their own families (Mixopterus to the Mixopteridae and Megalograptus and Echinognathus to the Megalograptidae). In 1942, Embrik Strand proposed another replacement name for Eusarcus, Eusarcana, despite the matter having been dealt with by Størmer eight years prior. Rhinocarcinosoma was split off from Carcinosoma in 1962 by Nestor Ivanovich Novozhilov, based on its carapace being different from that of other Carcinosoma.

Comparison of the sizes of the three largest species of the genera Carcinosoma, Eusarcana and Rhinocarcinosoma and a human

When revising the carcinosomatids in 1964, Kenneth Edward Caster and Erik N. Kjellesvig-Waering recognised Eusarcus and Carcinosoma to be distinct genera, determining the 1912 synonymisation to have been erroneous. Since Eusarcus was preoccupied, Caster and Kjellesvig-Waering, likely unaware of Strand's Eusarcana, coined the replacement name Paracarcinosoma for the species previously referred to Eusarcus. Also in 1964, Caster and Kjellesvig-Waering named the new genus Eocarcinosoma to account for Ordovician specimens of Eusarcus/Paracarcinosoma. Though most of those specimens have since been identified as pseudofossils, the type specimen of Eocarcinosoma is an authentic fossil and the earliest record of the family. The known geographical range of the carcinosomatids was considerably extended with the discovery of Rhinocarcinosoma fossils in Vietnam in the late 20th century, named as the species R. dosonensis in 2002.

Though Paracarcinosoma was frequently used by later researchers, Eusarcana, named earlier, was recognised by Jason A. Dunlop and James Lamsdell in 2012 as the valid replacement name of Eusarcus, transferring the species assigned to Paracarcinosoma to that genus and designating Paracarcinosoma as a junior synonym. A 2015 phylogenetic analysis by Lamsdell and colleagues recovered Holmipterus, a problematic eurypterid genus of uncertain affinities, as a basal carcinosomatid. The position of Holmipterus, on account of incomplete fossil material and an apparent combination of traits from different families, is far from certain within the eurypterid family tree and its fossils may even represent two different genera, mistakenly grouped together.

== Classification ==
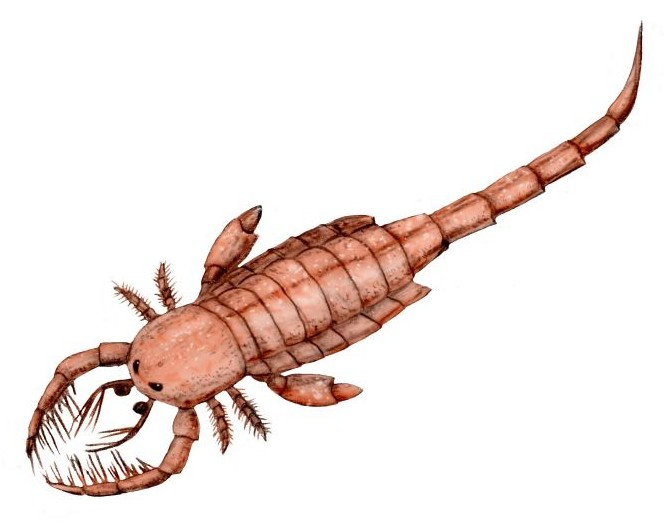
Mixopterids were the closest relatives of the carcinosomatids

The carcinosomatids are classified as part of the superfamily Carcinosomatoidea, within the infraorder Diploperculata. The Carcinosomatoidea also contains the families Mixopteridae and Megalograptidae. Carcinosomatidae was previously, from 1989 to the early 2000s, grouped with the family Hughmilleriidae in the superfamily 'Hughmillerioidea', on account of the spined limbs and all limbs, with the exception of the swimming paddles, being of a consistent type. The Hughmilleriidae is today regarded as basal members of the superfamily Pterygotioidea.

The internal phylogeny of the Carcinosomatoidea is poorly resolved (unclear). The first cladogram below follows a 2007 study by eurypterid researcher O. Erik Tetlie, which was in turn based on results from various phylogenetic analyses on eurypterids conducted between 2004 and 2007, whereas the second cladogram follows a 2015 study by James Lamsdell and colleagues. Both cladograms have been simplified to only display the Carcinosomatoidea. Tetlie (2007) recovered the Carcinosomatidae as a paraphyletic grouping, accounting for basal members of the Carcinosomatoidea, whereas Lamsdell et al. (2015) recovered the carcinosomatids as a monophyletic group.

Tetlie (2007)

- Carcinosomatoidea
  - - Carcinosoma newlini
    - - - Eusarcana scorpionis
        - Rhinocarcinosoma vaningeni
      - - Carcinosoma scoticus
        - Carcinosoma scorpiodes
        - - Mixopterus multispinosus
          - - Mixopterus simonsoni
            - Mixopterus kiaeri

Lamsdell et al. (2015)

- Carcinosomatoidea
  - - Megalograptidae
    - - Mixopteridae
      - Carcinosomatidae
        - Holmipterus suecicus
        - Rhinocarcinosoma vaningeni
        - - - Carcinosoma newlini
            - Carcinosoma libertyi
          - - Eusarcana acrocephalus
            - Eusarcana scorpionis

== Palaeoecology ==
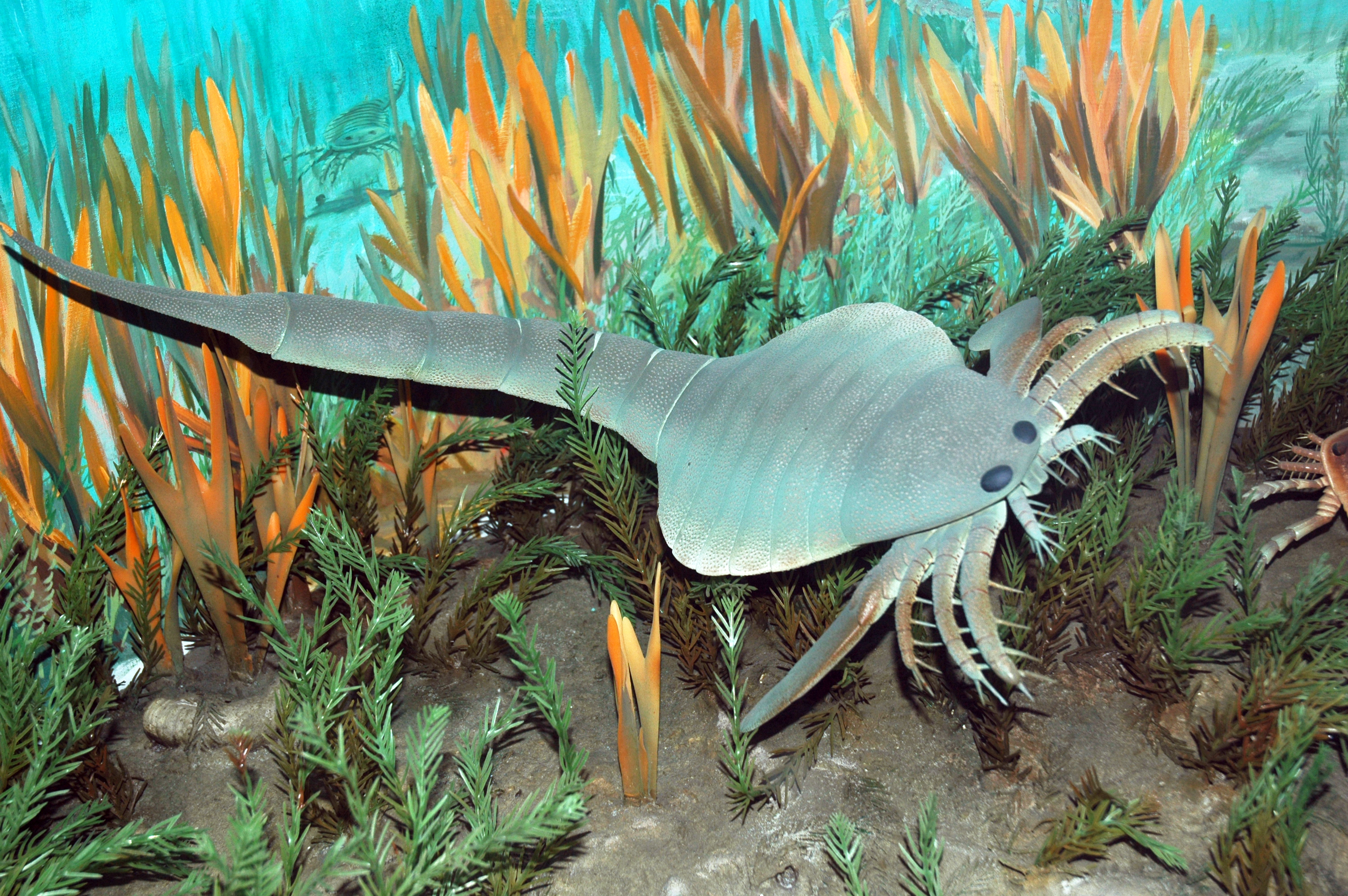
Model of a Eusarcana on a Silurian seafloor

Carcinosomatid eurypterids were among the most marine eurypterids, known from deposits that were once reefs, some in lagoonal settings, and deeper waters. This is in sharp contrast to their closest relatives, the mixopterids, which are not known from deeper waters. The only other eurypterid family known from deeper waters are the pterygotids, which had a similar distribution to the carcinosomatids, albeit more successful. Based on the distribution of the pterygotids, it is possible that carcinosomatids ranged worldwide. They are, alongside the pterygotids, the only eurypterid family known from the southern continent of Gondwana in the Silurian and Devonian. The only carcinosomatid genus known from non-marine deposits is Rhinocarcinosoma (though it is also known marine deposits), which has been found in fluvial (river) and lacustrine (lake) settings as well.

Because of their bodies not being as streamlined as those of many other swimming eurypterids, and on account of the unique morphologies of their telsons, it is considered likely that the carcinosomatids were not very active swimmers, probably adopting a more nektobenthic (swimming near the bottom) lifestyle. This lifestyle is especially exemplified in Rhinocarcinosoma, where the shovel-like protrusion at the front of its carapace may have been used for digging, or "mud-grubbing", and the swimming paddles were reduced in size compared to those of other carcinosomatids. Given their size, carcinosomatids may have been top predators or scavengers, digging for food or perhaps even burrowing and lying in wait as ambush predators. They may have fed on worms, other arthropods, brachiopods and fish, using their forelimbs to push food into their mouths.

== See also ==
- List of eurypterid genera
- Timeline of eurypterid research
- Megalograptidae
- Mixopteridae
