= Holmipterus =

Holmipterus Temporal range: Early Wenlock, 433.4 Ma
- Restoration of the pretelson and telson of H. suecicus, showing the cercal blades, following Kjellesvig-Waering (1979)

Scientific classification
- Kingdom: Animalia
- Phylum: Arthropoda
- Subphylum: Chelicerata
- Order: †Eurypterida
- Family: †Carcinosomatidae
- Genus: †Holmipterus; Kjellesvig-Waering, 1979

Type species
- †Holmipterus suecicus Kjellesvig-Waering, 1979

Extinct genus of arthropods

Holmipterus is a problematic genus of eurypterid, an extinct group of aquatic arthropods. The type and only species of Holmipterus, H. suecicus, is known from deposits of Middle Silurian age in the Sweden. The generic name honours Gerhard Holm, a renowned Swedish palaeontologist specialising in arthropods and crustaceans, and the species name suecicus is Latin for 'Swedish'.

Although Holmipterus was a large eurypterid and is known from multiple, albeit partial and fragmentary, specimens, it has proven difficult to determine where it fits in the eurypterid family tree. This is due to the fossil material referred to Holmipterus combining traits seen in different eurypterid groups, such as the Carcinosomatidae and Megalograptidae, and has some distinctive features, such as a telson (the posteriormost division of the body) with two articulating 'cercal blades', forming an organ capable of grasping. Though often classified either as a carcinosomatid or megalograptid, Holmipterus has also been classified as a genus of uncertain affinity within the Eurypterina suborder, or within the entire Eurypterida order. It is possible that the original 1979 description of Holmipterus suecicus reconstructed the telson inaccurately, and/or mistakenly combined fossil material actually belonging to two different genera.

== Description ==
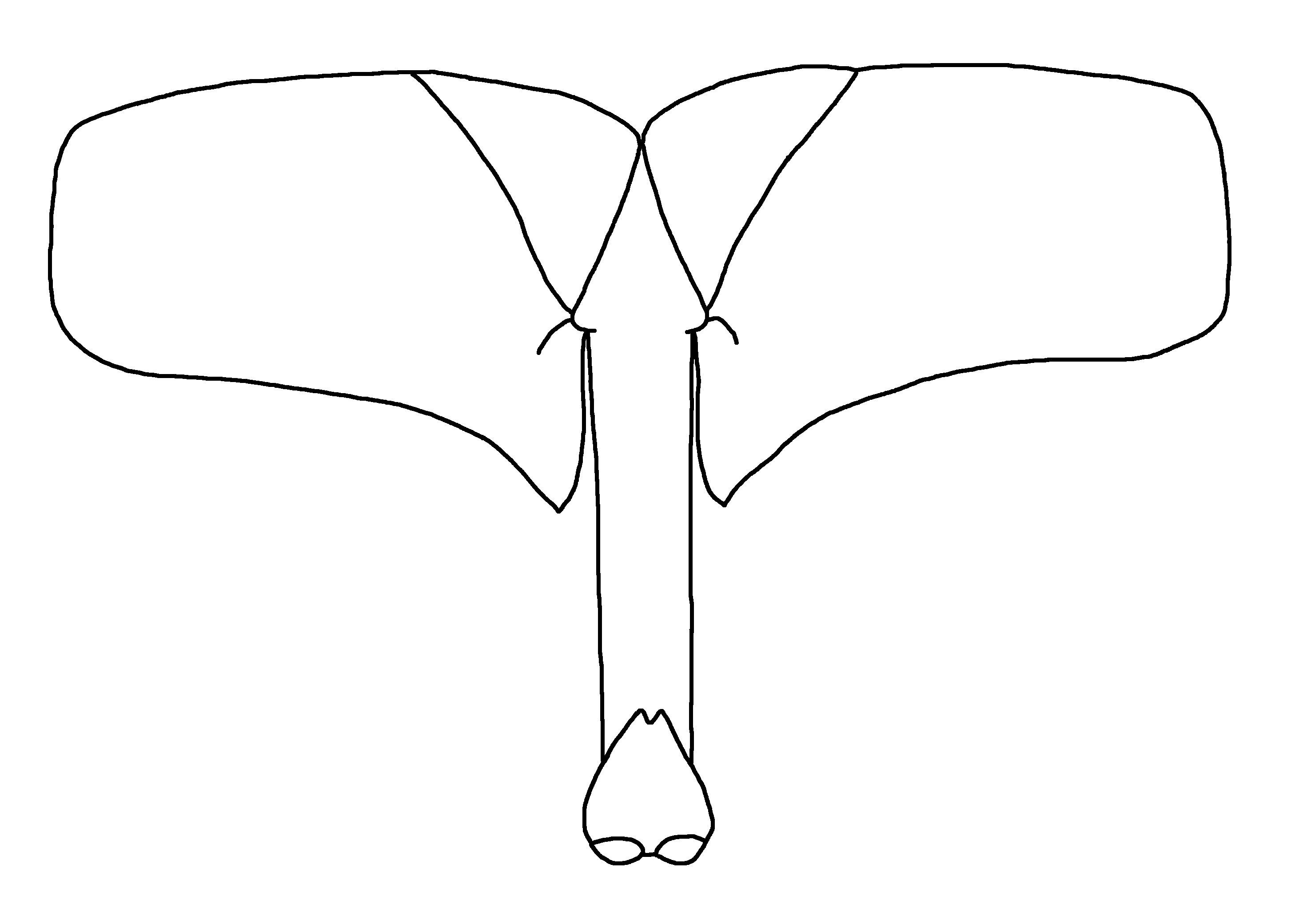
Operculum with type A genital appendage of H. suecicus

Although the precise size of Holmipterus is uncertain, the size of its fossils means that it must have been a relatively large eurypterid. Estimates based on the specimen indicates a length of around one metre. The most distinctive feature of Holmipterus was its telson (the posteriormost division of its body), which was unique among the eurypterids. Per the description, the pretelson (the segment immediately preceding telson) not only supports a spike-shaped and thin, yet robust, telson, but also two articulating 'cercal blades', meaning that the pretelson-telson assemblage could function as a 'formidable grasping weapon'. As (other) Carcinosomatoid eurypterids could, it is possible that Holmipterus could push its tail up "overhead", similar to a scorpion. The telson itself was curved downwards and had a serrated and flat platform near the base. The most complete telson found measured 8.65 centimetres (3.4 in) in length and was 1.46 centimetres (0.57 in) wide at the widest part of the serrated platform. Larger, less complete specimens are known, including a telson which was 1.82 centimetres (0.72 in) wide at the same point.

The telson of Holmipterus was similar to that of the eurypterid Megalograptus. Although the description was based on multiple specimens, given that no other eurypterid preserves articulating cercal blades, other than Megalograptus, and the fragmentary or partial nature of most of the fossil material, the accuracy of the description in regards to the reconstruction of the telson, in particular the cercal blades, has been questioned.

The chelicerae (frontal appendages) had four joints, with a long, narrow and falcate (with a curvature similar to that of the sickle) chelae (claws) 12.4 mm (0.49 in) long. The hand was about as broad as long, with a socket for the articulation of the condyle (round prominence at the end of a bone) of the 4th joint. It was 11.5 mm (0.45 in) long and 11.9 mm (0.47 in) wide. The walking legs are only known by two joints which have large, curved spines, one on each side. These walking legs are characteristic of the group Carcinosomatidae in which the legs were flattened and with the venter (abdomen) turned anteriorly. They were different from the highly differentiated legs of Megalograptus. The spines of the walking legs were striated with narrow and longitudinal ridges along the back of the curved part. The swimming legs are known for a paddle retaining the sixth and seventh segments. The triangular lobe of the sixth joint was very long with linear scales along most of the posterior border which grade into serrated scales at the distal end. The seventh joint was large and finely serrated along the anterior edge and increasingly thick along the distal end. The eighth joint was a small triangular spine. An epimera (the part of a segment next to an articulation of an appendage) of the first tergite whose edge slopes back proves that the entire mesosoma was very tumid, as in the carcinosomatids. It is possible that the original description of Holmipterus is in error and that the fossil material actually belongs to two different genera.

== History of research ==
Fossils of Holmipterus have been found at the 'Vattenfallet' site in the southern outskirts of Visby on the island of Gotland in Sweden, in deposits of Early Wenlock (Middle Silurian) age. Though they were first figured by Gerhard Holm, a renowned Swedish palaeontologist specialising in arthropods and crustaceans, in the early 20th century, Holm never released or published these figures. Holmipterus suecicus was described in 1979 by Erik N. Kjellesvig-Waering, with the generic name honouring Holm and the species name suecicus being Latin for 'Swedish'. Erik N. Kjellesvig-Waering based the creation of the new genus mainly on the highly distinct telson, but also included some partial and fragmentary specimens consisting of other body parts, such as the appendages and the main body, without comment as to why. Whether all specimens should be accommodated within one genus has been questioned by some later researchers.

== Classification ==
The pretelson of Holmipterus was rounded in its cross-section, which suggests that the genus belonged to one of the three families in the superfamily Carcinosomatoidea: Megalograptidae, Mixopteridae or Carcinosomatidae. In the original 1979 description, Kjellesvig-Waering assigned Holmipterus to the family Megalograptidae, but noted that "There is little doubt in my mind that Holmipterus is so different from Megalograptus that when more specimens of the former are known, it will be best to separate them into different families."

In 1989, Victor P. Tollerton referred the genus, though noted that this was uncertain, to the Carcinosomatidae based on the fragmentary fossils of the leg and the incomplete swimming paddle. Tollerton noted that he believed Kjellesvig-Waering's original description to be in error, especially in regards to the reconstruction of the telson (particularly the cercal blades) and that it was likely that the original fossil material actually belonged to two different genera. In a 2007 study, O. Erik Tetlie noted that Holmipterus as a megalograptid was a "very questionable" classification and listed it as a genus with uncertain affinity within the Eurypterina suborder. In 2009, James C. Lamsdell and Simon J. Braddy classified Holmipterus as a megalograptid, but in 2015, Lamsdell and colleagues recovered Holmipterus as a basal carcinosomatid in a phylogenetic analysis. The cladogram below follows the analysis by Lamsdell et al. (2015).

- Carcinosomatoidea
  - - Megalograptidae
    - - Mixopteridae
      - Carcinosomatidae
        - Holmipterus suecicus
        - Rhinocarcinosoma vaningeni
        - - - Carcinosoma newlini
            - Carcinosoma libertyi
          - - Eusarcana acrocephalus
            - Eusarcana scorpionis

The Summary List of Fossil Spiders and Their Relatives, a document compiled by Jason A. Dunlop, David Penney and Denise Jekel, classified Holmipterus as Eurypterida incertae sedis in its 2015 and 2018 editions, indicating an uncertain taxonomic position within the Eurypterida as a whole.

== Palaeoecology ==
The deposits in which Holmipterus was discovered was once a reef environment that supported a diverse fauna and flora. The presence of fossilised algae in the deposits indicate that the environment was within the photic zone, and the presence of dasycladaceaean algae indicate that the depth of the sea never reached more than 100 metres (330 ft). The fossils referred to Holmipterus suecicus were recovered alongside fossils of four other eurypterid species: Eurypterus serratus, Dolichopterus gotlandicus, Erettopterus serricaudatus and Erettopterus carinatus. Alongside the other eurypterids, a large number of other organisms have been recovered, including the aforementioned algae, sponges, foraminiferans, chitinozoans, melanosclerites, corals, polychaetes, monoplacophorans, chitons, gastropods, bivalves, rostroconchs, cephalopods, trilobites, phyllocarids, ostracodes, bryozoans, brachiopods, tentaculitans, machaeridians, graptolites, echinoderms and agnathans. In total, almost five hundred different fossil species are known from the site.

== See also ==
- List of eurypterid genera
- Timeline of eurypterid research
