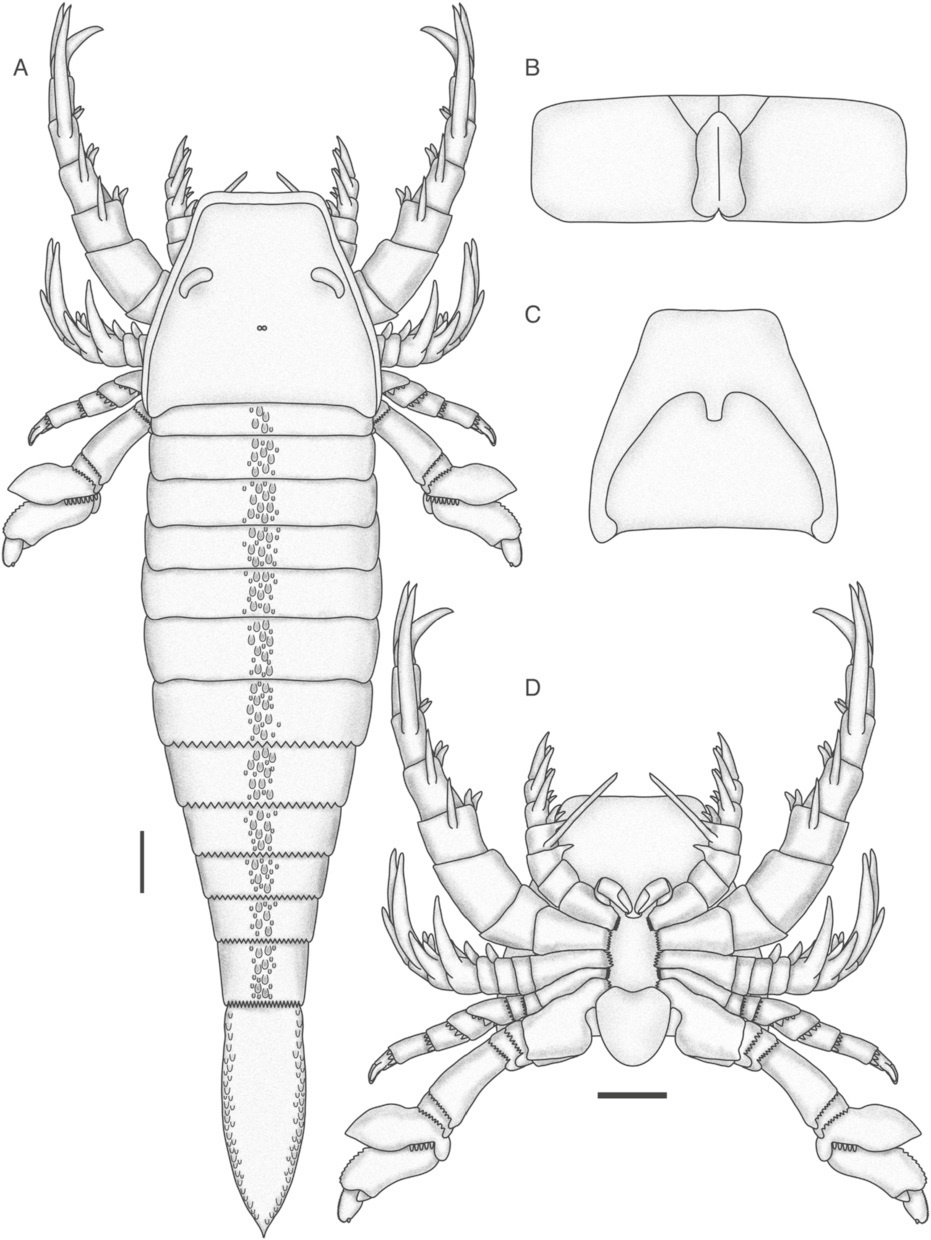
- Reconstruction of Pentecopterus decorahensis, showing a dorsal view (a), a genital operculum (b), a ventral view of carapace (c) and a ventral view of prosoma (d).

Scientific classification
- Kingdom: Animalia
- Phylum: Arthropoda
- Subphylum: Chelicerata
- Order: †Eurypterida
- Family: †Megalograptidae
- Genus: †Pentecopterus; Lamsdell et al., 2015

Type species
- †Pentecopterus decorahensis Lamsdell et al., 2015

= Pentecopterus =

Pentecopterus Temporal range: Darriwilian, 467.3–458.4 Ma

Extinct genus of arthropods

Pentecopterus is a genus of eurypterid, an extinct group of aquatic arthropods. Fossils have been registered from the Darriwilian age of the Middle Ordovician period, as early as 467.3 million years ago. The genus contains only one species, P. decorahensis, that was previously considered the oldest known eurypterid, surpassing all other Ordovician eurypterids known at the time, such as Brachypterus, in age by almost 9 million years; however, newer discoveries have yielded evidence for eurypterids that were older still (?Carcinosoma aurorae dated back to the Tremadocian). The generic name derives from the penteconter, a warship from ancient Greece, and the suffix -pterus, which means "wing" and is often used in other genus of eurypterids. The specific name refers to Decorah, Iowa, where Pentecopterus was discovered.

The genus is classified as part of the Megalograptidae family of eurypterids, a family differentiated from other eurypterids by the possession of two or more pairs of spines per podomere on prosomal appendage IV, a reduction of almost all spines and the large exoskeletons with ovate to triangular scales. It is estimated that Pentecopterus had a length of 1.7 metres (5 ft 7 in), turning it into one of the largest eurypterids or arthropods ever discovered. However, Pentecopterus was overtaken by other eurypterids such as Jaekelopterus rhenaniae, the largest known arthropod with 2.5 metres (8 ft 2 in).

A replica of the eurypterid was created for the National Geographic's "The Strange Truth" program. The project had the help of James Lamsdell, one of the paleontologists who contributed to the description of Pentecopterus, who provided information and two illustrations. When it was finished, it was taken to the impact site where the original fossils were discovered.

== Description ==
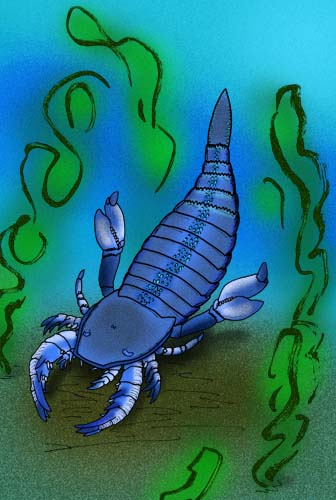
Life restoration of P. decorahensis.

Pentecopterus is among the largest known arthropods, with the largest specimens having an estimated length of 1.7 metres (5 ft 7 in). With this size, it exceeds all other genera of the Megalograptidae. While fragmentary tergites have been suggested to indicate a length of 2 metres (6 ft 7 in) for Megalograptus shideleri, they actually indicate a length of at most 56 cm (22 in). Most Pentecopterus specimens would have had a total length of 75–100 cm (30–39 in).

The large amount of fragmentary specimens recovered of Pentecopterus, including juveniles and exuviae specimens, have allowed an almost complete description of the external morphology. Pentecopterus is diagnosed as a megalograptid retaining a single pair of spines on the third podomere of the third prosomal appendages, a short appendage V with a serrated distal margin of podomeres; prosomal ventral plates widening anteriorly, posterolateral pretelson lacking expansion and xiphos-like shaped telson, with a margin laterally ornamented with scales. The prosomal ventral plate is of Erieopterus-type, that is, it consists of a single plate that covers the anterior and lateral portion of the ventral carapace. The appendages are attached to the soft ventral integument of the plate. The general outline of the carapace was quadrate with an elongate trapezoidal outline.

== History of research ==
Most of the fossils of the Winneshiek Shale of Decorah, where the fossils of Pentecopterus have been found, were recovered in 2010 from the upper 4 m section of the aforementioned site in Iowa. Other samples were collected from blocks eroded during flooding, which are assumed to have been sourced from the uppermost 2–3 m. The total number of fossils found is over 5,000, of which around 6.6% belong to eurypterids. Among the material eurypterid is the holotype of Pentecopterus, SUI 139941, which consists of a prosomal ventral plate and proximal podomeres of prosomal appendage II, in addition to multiple paratypes and additional material, all housed in the University of Iowa Paleontology Repository.

The genus was named by James C. Lamsdell, Derek E. G. Briggs, Huaibao P. Liu, Brian J. Witzke and Robert M. McKay in 2015 and the type species is Pentecopterus decorahensis. It is the only eurypterid discovered in Iowa other than Mycterops whitei, a species whose assignment to Mycterops is doubtful. The genus is named after the penteconter, an early galley (ship) from ancient Greece and one of the first true warships, due to some similarities in shape and that the taxon represents an early predator. The suffix -pterus means "wing" and is commonly applied to eurypterid genera. The specific name decorahensis refers to Decorah, Iowa, where the fossils were discovered.

== Classification ==
The size of P. decorahensis compared to a human.

Pentecopterus is classified within the family Megalograptidae in the monotypic superfamily Megalograptoidea. Pentecopterus shares with the other megalograptids a series of characteristics such as the randomly-oriented armature on the swollen podomeres of appendage IV and the narrow gnathobase bearing multiple rows of small teeth on the coxa of appendage V. It also shares with Megalograptus the rows of enlarged scales running down the center of the opisthosomal tergites, however, these differ from those of Megalograptus because they are not situated on pronounced ridges. It is separated from the other megalograptids by the presence of only one pair of spines on the third podomere of appendage III, a single terminal spine on each prosomal appendage, and the absence of dense cuticular ornamentation. Pentecopterus also lacks the cercal blades that occur in Megalograptus, where they have been interpreted as functioning as a biological rudder, like the pterygotid telson. This suggests that Pentecopterus was less able to swim than Megalograptus. Further, Pentecopterus has some features unique among the eurypterids, notably the shape of its carapace and the unusual shape of the sixth podomere of appendage VI. Pentecopterus also possesses lateral scales on the telson, something otherwise only seen in pterygotid eurypterids. This feature likely arose through convergent evolution.

The cladogram below is simplified from a study by Lamsdell et al. (2015), showing the phylogenetic positions of the genera within Megalograptidae.

- Megalograptidae
  - - Echinognathus clevelandi
    - - - Megalograptus williamsae
        - - Megalograptus ohioensis
          - Megalograptus welchi
  - - Pentecopterus decorahensis

== Paleoecology ==
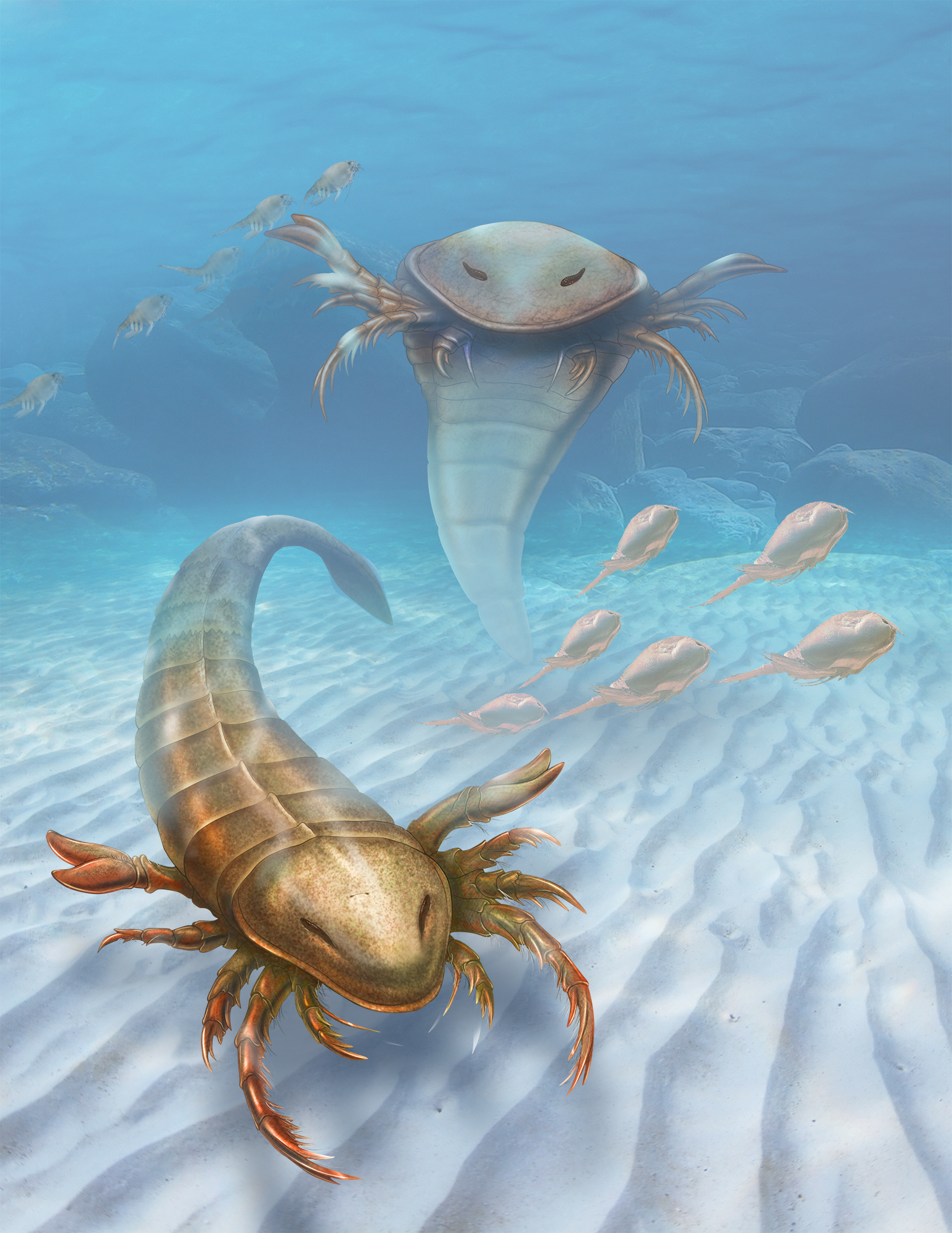
A pair of P. decorahensis in their habitat illustrated by Patrick J. Lynch.

Pentecopterus is known from Middle Ordovician deposits in the Winneshiek Shale of Iowa dated to the Darriwilian (467.3 mya). The Winneshiek Shale is an 18–27 m thick greenish brown to dark grey laminated sandy shale that crops out only in one locality which is mostly submerged by the Upper Iowa River near Decorah. Bore hole data indicate that the total thickness of the Winneshiek Shale is about 18 m at the outcrop locality, but only the upper 4 m was systematically collected during the excavation. In these 4 m, most of the Pentecopterus fossils were collected. This shale is confined to a circular basin about 5.6 km in diameter in the Decorah area that probably originated from a meteorite impact. Palaeogeographic and paleoenvironmental studies suggest that this crater was located in marginal to nearshore marine conditions with little oxygen, possibly in a brackish water environment within the tropical southern Laurentia. The Winneshiek fauna is very different from the shelly marine fossil fauna, which indicates that this environment was inhospitable to the typical marine taxa. This fauna was composed of conodonts, arthropods, possible jawless fishes and algae. It was likely an apex predator.

== See also ==
- List of eurypterid genera
