= Kenneth Edward Caster =

American paleontologist (1908–1992)

- Born: 26 January 1908; New Albany, Pennsylvania
- Died: 18 May 1992 (aged 84); Cincinnati, Ohio
- Education: Cornell University
- Awards: Guggenheim Fellowships (1943, 1954, & 1955); Orville A. Derby Medal (1952); Fulbright Fellowships (1955 & one quarter 1964); Gondwana Medal (1956); Paleontological Society Medal (1976)
- Scientific career
- Workplaces: University of Cincinnati
- Thesis: Stratigraphy and Paleontology of Northwestern Pennsylvania, Pt. 1: Stratigraphy
- Doctoral advisor: Gilbert Dennison Harris

Kenneth Edward Caster (1908–1992) was an American geologist and invertebrate paleontologist. He gained an international reputation for his research on fossil echinoderms and arthropods and the use of the facies concept in stratigraphy. He made important contributions on fossil echinoderms to the Treatise on Invertebrate Paleontology.

== Biography ==
Growing up in Ithaca, New York, Kenneth E. Caster was a Boy Scout, influenced by the Boy Scout leaders, James Chester Bradley and Ephraim Laurence Palmer, both of whom were professors at Cornell University. There Caster graduated in 1929 with a B.A. in zoology, in 1931 with an M.S. thesis on Eocene mollusks and foraminifers of Angola, and in 1933 with a Ph.D. thesis on stratigraphy. At Cornell he was from 1928 to 1930 an assistant in entomology, from 1929 to 1930 an assistant in geology, from 1930 to 1932 an instructor in paleontology, and from 1932 to 1935 an instructor in geology. He married Anneliese "Annie" Sophie Charlotte Schloh (1910–1995) on June 18, 1933, in Queens, New York City. She graduated from Cornell University in 1931. From 1935 to 1936 he taught biology as an assistant head of the department of science at the Wadsworth Normal and Training School located in Geneseo, New York, which is about 115 kilometers away from Ithaca, New York.

In September 1936 Kenneth Caster and his wife moved to Cincinnati, where he was employed at the University of Cincinnati. At the University of Cincinnati Museum, he was a curator of paleontology from 1936 to 1940. In the University of Cincinnati's department of geology, he was from 1936 to 1940 an assistant professor, from 1940 to 1952 an associate professor, and from 1952 to 1978 a full professor, retiring as professor emeritus in 1979. He and his students thoroughly investigated the geology and paleontology of Ohio. During his academic career, he supervised 30 master's theses and 25 doctoral dissertations. He did research in geology and paleontology on four continents and published some papers in German and some in Portuguese.

In 1943 Kenneth Caster was awarded a Guggenheim Fellowship for the academic year 1943–1944 for the purpose of a field study of the Paleozoic strata of the Andes Mountains in Colombia and Venezuela. During an extended leave of absence from the University of Cincinnati, he served from 1945 to 1948 as a visiting professor and head of the University of São Paulo's department of geology and paleontology. In 1947 he was also a visiting professor at Colombia's Escuela Nacional de Minas, Medellín. Following his years in Brazil, he also visited Uruguay, Argentina, and Chile. With the support of two Guggenheim Fellowships, he did research during the academic year 1954–1955 in South Africa and during the academic year 1955–1956 in New Zealand and Australia. For the academic year 1955–1956 he was a Fulbright Visiting professor at the University of Tasmania. With another Fulbright Fellowship for a few months in 1964 in Germany, he gave lectures on paleontology.

Caster was a pioneer of ichnology in North America. In 1938 and 1939 he published two papers debunking the hypothesis of fossil tracks made by vertebrates in the Upper Devonian and presented evidence that the fossil tracks were actually made by animals similar to horseshoe crabs. His research on invertebrate paleontology spanned geological time from the Cambrian to the Cretaceous and included fossils from 5 phyla: cephalopods and bivalves (Mollusca), eurypterids (Arthropoda), sponges (Porifera), jellyfish (Cnidaria), and Brachiopoda. His research in the Southern Hemisphere convinced him the validity of plate tectonics. According to Stephen Jay Gould, in the early 1960s Caster seemed to be the only major paleontologist who openly supported the theory of continental drift.

Caster's Southern Hemisphere research earned him in 1952 the Orville A. Derby Medal at the Brazilian Geological Survey Centennial and in 1956 the Gondwana Medal of the Geological Survey of India. For the academic year 1959–1960 he was the president of the Paleontological Society. In 1975 his former students honored him with a Festschrift volume. During his long career he was the author or coauthor of over 100 scientific publications, earning him in 1976 the Paleontological Society Medal. In 1939 he discovered fossils belonging to an extinct species of glass sponge. He named the species Titusvillia drakei. In 1993 an elaborate ceremony dedicated Titusville's historical marker commemorating the discovery. Some of the fossils collected by Kenneth E. Caster are in the Invertebrate Paleontology Collection of the Cincinnati Museum Center.

In his research he was assisted by his wife Annie. She was a geologist and illustrated many of his papers. She also illustrated Nevin Fennemen's two-volume work Physiography of western United States (1931, McGraw-Hill) and Physiography of eastern United States (1938, McGraw-Hill). Kenneth and Annie Caster gave generous help to amateur paleontologists in the Cincinnati area, which has a great abundance of well-preserved fossils from the Late Ordovician. A group called the "Dry Dredgers" was founded in April 1942 on the basis of an evening course that he taught during the late 1930s and early 1940s. In 1982, Kenneth Caster published a paper on the amateur paleontologists who flourished in the Cincinnati area near the end of the 19th century.

== See also ==
- Carcinosomatidae
- Cincta
- Chasmataspis
- Echinognathus
- Eocarcinosoma
- Megalograptus
- Timeline of eurypterid research

== Selected publications ==
- Caster, Kenneth E. (1938). "A Restudy of the Tracks of Paramphibius". Journal of Paleontology. 12 (1): 3–60. JSTOR 1298395.
- Caster, Kenneth E. (1939). "Siliceous Sponges from Mississippian and Devonian Strata of the Penn-York Embayment". Journal of Paleontology. 13 (1): 1–20. JSTOR 1298616.
- Oehser, Paul Henry, ed. (1941). "The age and relations of Colombian Devonian strata by Kenneth E. Caster". Proceedings of the eighth American scientific congress held in Washington May 10-18, 1940. pp. 27–67.
- Caster, Kenneth E. (1942). "The Paleontological Collections at the University of Cincinnati". Science. 95 (2470): 454–455. Bibcode:1942Sci....95..454C. doi:10.1126/science.95.2470.454. PMID 17736881.[https://www.science.org/doi/10.1126/science.95.2470.455 p. 455)
- Cooper, G. A.; Butts, C.; Caster, K. E.; Chadwick, G. H.; Goldring, W.; Kindle, E. M.; Kirk, E.; Merriam, C. W.; Swartz, F. M.; Warren, P. S.; Warthin, A. S.; Willard, B. (1942). "Correlation of the Devonian sedimentary formations of North America". Geological Society of America Bulletin. 53 (12_1): 1729–1793. Bibcode:1942GSAB...53.1729C. doi:10.1130/GSAB-53-1729.
- Caster, K. E. (1944). "Limuloid trails from the Upper Triassic (Chinle) of the Petrified Forest National Monument, Arizona". American Journal of Science. 242 (2): 74–84. Bibcode:1944AmJS..242...74C. doi:10.2475/ajs.242.2.74.
- Caster, K. E.; Kjellesvig-Waering, Erik N. (1953). "Melbournopterus, a new Silurian eurypterid from Australia" (PDF). Journal of Paleontology. 27 (1): 153–156.
- Caster, Kenneth E.; Kjellesvig-Waering, Erik N. (1956). "Some Notes on the Genus Dolichopterus Hall". Journal of Paleontology. 30 (1): 19–28. JSTOR 1300372.
- Brooks, H. K.; Caster, Kenneth E. (1956). "Pseudoarctolepis sharpi, n. Gen., n. Sp. (Phyllocarida), from the Wheeler Shale (Middle Cambrian) of Utah". Journal of Paleontology. 30 (1): 9–14. JSTOR 1300370.
- Durham, J. W.; Caster, K. E. (1963). "Helicoplacoidea: A New Class of Echinoderms". Science. 140 (3568): 820–822. Bibcode:1963Sci...140..820D. doi:10.1126/science.140.3568.820. PMID 17746435. S2CID 33443660.
- Caster, Kenneth E. (1971). "Reviewed work: Les Echinodermes Carpoïdes de l'Ordovicien Inférieur de la Montagne noire (France), G. Ubaghs". Journal of Paleontology. 45 (5): 919–921. JSTOR 1302794.
- Caster, Kenneth E. (1983). "A new Silurian carpoid echinoderm from Tasmania and a revision of the Allanicytidiidae". Alcheringa: An Australasian Journal of Palaeontology. 7 (4): 321–335. Bibcode:1983Alch....7..321C. doi:10.1080/03115518308619615.
- Boucot, A. J.; Caster, Kenneth E. (1984). "First Occurrence of Scaphiocoelia (Brachiopoda; Terebratulida) in the Early Devonian of the Paraná Basin, Brazil". Journal of Paleontology. 58 (6): 1354–1359. JSTOR 1304883.
