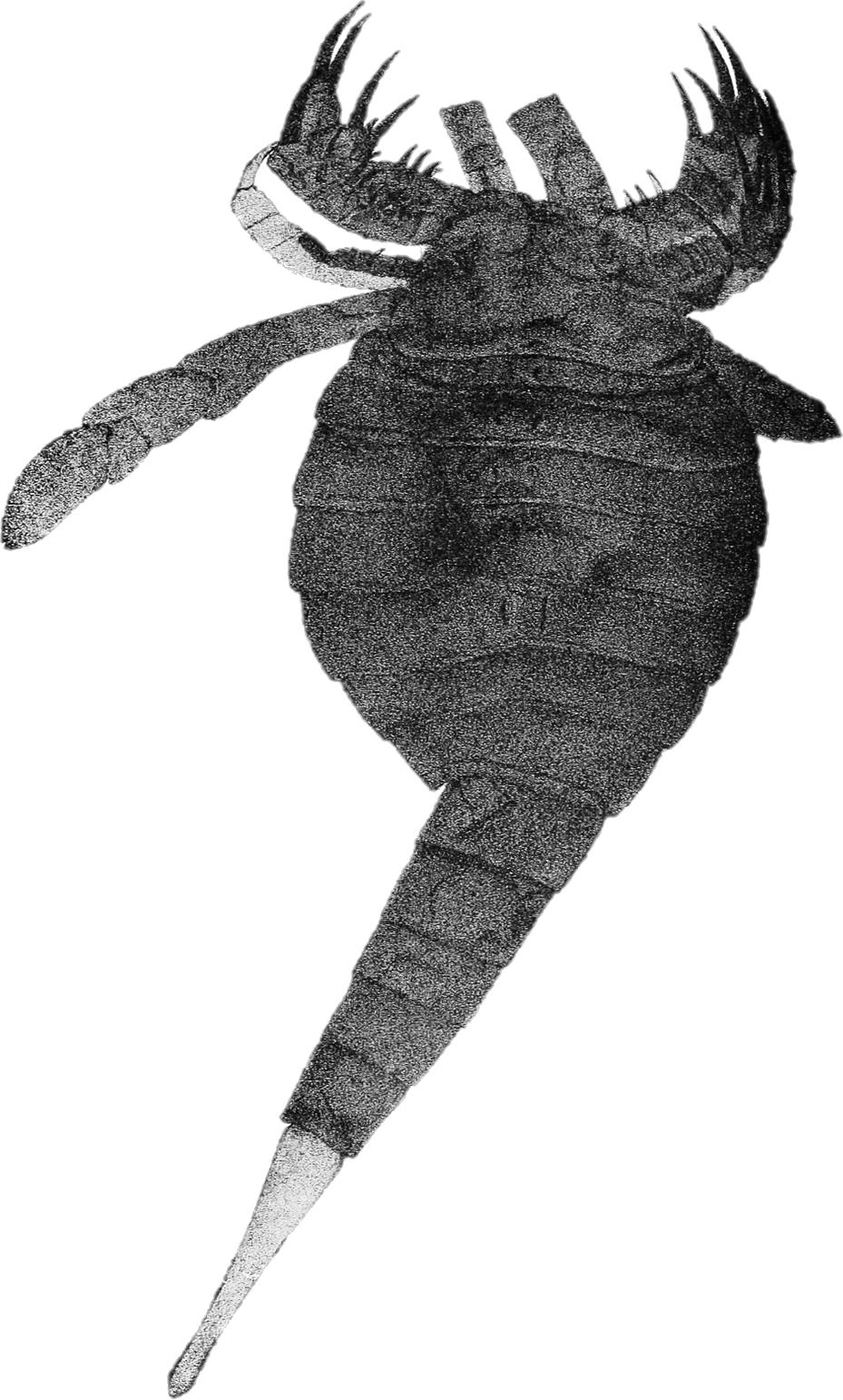
- Fossil of C. scorpioides.

Scientific classification
- Kingdom: Animalia
- Phylum: Arthropoda
- Subphylum: Chelicerata
- Order: †Eurypterida
- Superfamily: †Carcinosomatoidea
- Family: †Carcinosomatidae
- Genus: †Cruinnopterus; Lamsdell, 2025

Type species
- †Cruinnopterus scorpioides (Woodward, 1868)

Other species
- †C. scotica (Laurie, 1899)

Synonyms
- Carcinosoma obesus; Carcinosoma scorpioides; Carcinosoma scoticus; Eusarcana obesus; Pterygotus raniceps

= Cruinnopterus =

Cruinnopterus Temporal range: Llandovery–Wenlock

Extinct genus of sea scorpions

Cruinnopterus is a genus of eurypterid, an extinct group of aquatic arthropods. The genus contains two species, the type species C. scorpioides from the Llandovery epoch, and the younger C. scotica, from the Wenlock epoch. Fossils are mainly known from Scotland, but have also been found in Ontario, Canada.

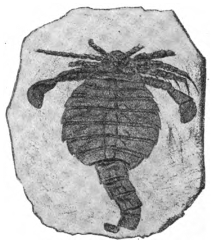
"Eusarcana obesus", found to be a junior synonym of C. scorpioides, and a juvenile specimen

Cruinnopterus differs from other carcinosomatids in the structure of its prosomal appendages, which in appearance are roughly intermediate between those of Carcinosoma and the more derived Lanarkopterus. Both C. scorpioides and C. scotica also do not have a constriction of the preabdomen, a feature seen in species of Carcinosoma.

== See also ==
- List of eurypterid genera
