= Merostomichnites =

Merostomichnites Temporal range: Silurian

Trace fossil classification
- Kingdom: Animalia
- Phylum: Arthropoda
- Subphylum: Chelicerata
- Order: †Eurypterida
- Ichnogenus: †Merostomichnites; Packard, 1990

Ichnogenus of arthropods

Merostomichnites is an ichnofossil genus, interpreted as a eurypterid trace. Traces produced by this large eurypterid were described from the Silurian and Lower Ordovician, and has been found in Portugal and Norway. The eurypterid trail was found by Hanken and Dr. J. Miller in 1971. The tracks found in Norway were likely made by Mixopterus kiaeri.

== See also ==
- List of eurypterid genera
