= Melanosclerite =

Melanosclerite Temporal range: Lower Cambrian – Frasnian

Scientific classification
- Domain: Eukaryota
- Kingdom: Animalia
- Phylum: Cnidaria (?)
- Order: †Melanoscleritoitidea; Eisenack, 1963
- Family: †Melanoscleritoitidae; Eisenack, 1942

Group of problematic fossils

The Melanosclerites are a group of problematic microfossils obtained by palynological processing.

== Morphology ==
The form-taxon contains a wide array of rod-like fossils, 100 μm to some mm long, that culminate in a broad bulbous 'head', often separated from the stalk by a constriction. The bulbous end may bear broad 'prongs', giving the appearance of the end of a human femur where the prongs are paired, although the prongs often occur in higher number – five, six, a dozen – with some resemblance to Namacalathus.

== Affinity ==
The affinity of melanosclerites is uncertain; algal has been proposed, but hydrozoan (cnidarian) is preferred, though not conclusively established. Melanoscleritoites Eisenack, 1963 is interpreted as a hydrozoan, with other taxa not attributable to that particular class, on the basis of a broad morphological similarity – though the distinguishing features are far from unequivocal, and the preservation of the material raises some taphonomic problems. The composition resembles that of chitinozoans, scolecodonts, graptolites, and fungi – though at least one species of extant cubomedusan hydroid does produce a similarity resilient "chitinous" 'wall'.

== Occurrence ==
They have been reported in shallow marine sandstones and limestones, as well as upper slope and open marine sediments, in strata from the Lower Cambrian to Upper Devonian.

Taxa include:

- Eichbaumia Schallreuter, 1981
  - Eichbaumia incus Schallreuter, 1981
- Melanoarbustum Górka, 1971
  - Melanoarbustum balticum Górka, 1971
- Melanoclava Eisenack, 1942
  - Melanoclava betaotda Eisenack, 1942
- Melanocyathus Eisenack, 1942
  - Melanocyathus dentatus Eisenack, 1942
- Melanoporella Górka, 1971
  - Melanoporella polonica Górka, 1971
  - Melanoporella bulla
  - Melanoporella clava Schallreuter, 1981
- Melanorhachis Eisenack, 1942
  - Melanorhachis regularis Eisenack, 1942
- Melanoscleritoites Eisenack, 1963
- Melanosteus Eisenack, 1942
  - Melanosteus acutus Eisenack, 1942
- Melanostylus Eisenack, 1963
  - Melanostylus coronifer Eisenack, 1963
- Menola Schallreuter, 1981
  - Menola os Schallreuter, 1981
- Mirachitina Eisenack, 1963
  - Mirachitina quadrupedis Eisenack, 1963
- Semenola Schallreuter, 1981
  - Semenola semen Schallreuter, 1981
