= Titusvillia =

Scientific classification
- Kingdom: Animalia
- Phylum: Porifera
- Class: Hexactinellida
- Order: †Lyssakida
- Family: †Titusvilliidae
- Genus: †Titusvillia; Caster, 1939
- Species: †T. drakei

Binomial name
- †Titusvillia drakei Caster, 1939

Extinct genus of sponges

Titusvillia is an extinct genus of colonial glass sponges that existed during the carboniferous period around 300 million years ago. It is represented by a single species, Titusvillia drakei.

== Taxonomy ==
It is uncertain if taxa in the clade Silicarea are a separate phylum, or contained within the phylum Porifera.
