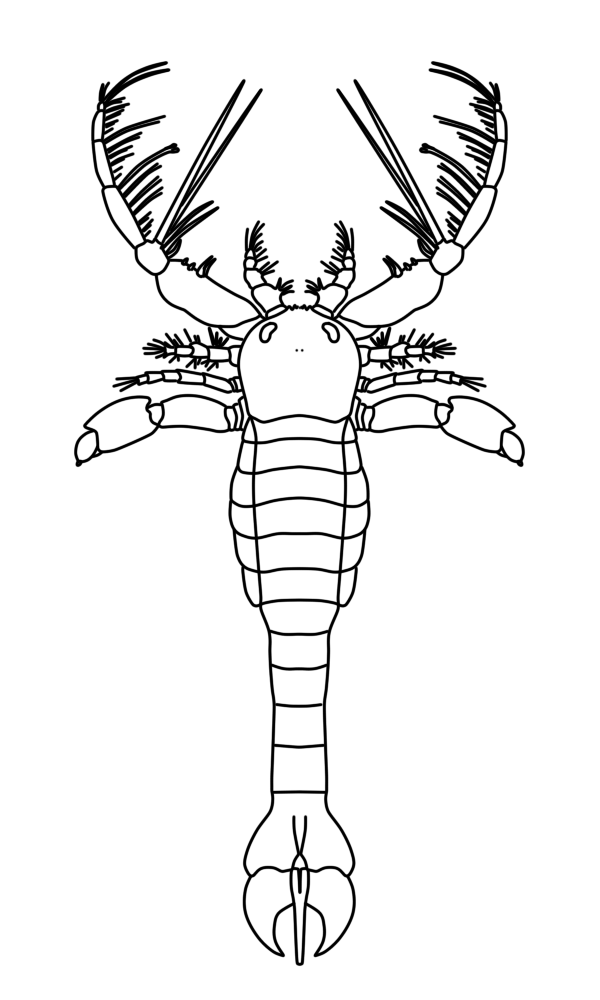
- Megalograptus

Scientific classification
- Kingdom: Animalia
- Phylum: Arthropoda
- Subphylum: Chelicerata
- Order: †Eurypterida
- Infraorder: †Diploperculata
- Superfamily: †Carcinosomatoidea
- Family: †Megalograptidae; Caster & Kjellesvig-Waering, 1955

Genera
- †Megalograptus; †Echinognathus; †Pentecopterus

= Megalograptidae =

Megalograptidae Temporal range: Middle Ordovician - Late Ordovician, 467.3–443.8 Ma

Family of arthropods (fossil)

Megalograptidae are a family of eurypterids, an extinct group of aquatic chelicerate arthropods commonly known as "sea scorpions".

The megalograptids were likely the first major successful group of eurypterids, evidenced by a Late Ordovician radiation. All known members of the Megalograptidea are from the Late Ordovician of Laurentia with the exception of the large Pentecopterus from the Middle Ordovician.

== Description ==
Megalograptids are characterized by large exoskeletons with ovate to triangular scales. The prosoma (head) is subquadrate, with a tonguelike anterior process bearing marginal spines, and compound eyes on the top front of the head. The chelicerae (claws in front of the mouth) are small and short. The first and third pairs of walking legs are short, with diverging or closely spaced spines. The second pair of walking legs is enormously developed, with long paired spines. The fourth pair of walking legs are nearly spineless. The preabdomen, the front portion of the body, is narrow with axial furrows, while the postabdomen is moderately narrow with broad, flat and curved appendages on the last body segment. The telson is short and lanceolate.

== Classification ==
The Megalograptidae are thought to be relatively primitive (between the genus Onychopterella and the Eurypteroidea) because they lack the synapomorphy of all more derived swimming eurypterines; namely, the modified distal margin of the sixth podomere of the swimming leg. Though such a position has never been recovered in phylogenetic analyses and is primarily based on this missing characteristic (along with other primitive characters), the clade might instead be placed between the Eurypteroidea and the Mixopteroidea. Indeed, the sixth podomere in the swimming leg resembles the reduced podomere found in the Mixopteridae.

== Genera ==
Family Megalograptidae Caster & Kjellesvig-Waering, 1955

- Megalograptus Miller, 1874
- Echinognathus Walcott, 1882
- Pentecopterus Lamsdell et al., 2015

== See also ==
- List of eurypterids
