= Rudolf Ruedemann =

American paleontologist

Rudolf Ruedemann (October 16, 1864–June 18, 1956) was a German American paleontologist, widely known as an expert in graptolites, enigmatic fossil animals. He worked at the New York State Museum for over 40 years, including a decade as State Paleontologist of New York. and was elected to the U.S. National Academy of Sciences in 1928. Born in Georgenthal, Germany, he was educated in Europe, earning a PhD in 1887 from the University of Jena (Ph.D., 1887), and a second doctorate in 1889 from the University of Strasbourg where he was an assistant in geology from 1887 to 1892. He emigrated to the United States in 1892 and taught at the high schools of Lowville and Dolgeville, New York for several years before joining the State Museum in 1899, where he worked for the remainder of his career. Although his primary interests were in graptolites he also made contributions to other areas of invertebrate paleontology, describing new species of fossil corals, eurypterids ("sea scorpions"), trilobites, and cephalopods.

He was married with a daughter and six sons, and retired in 1937.
