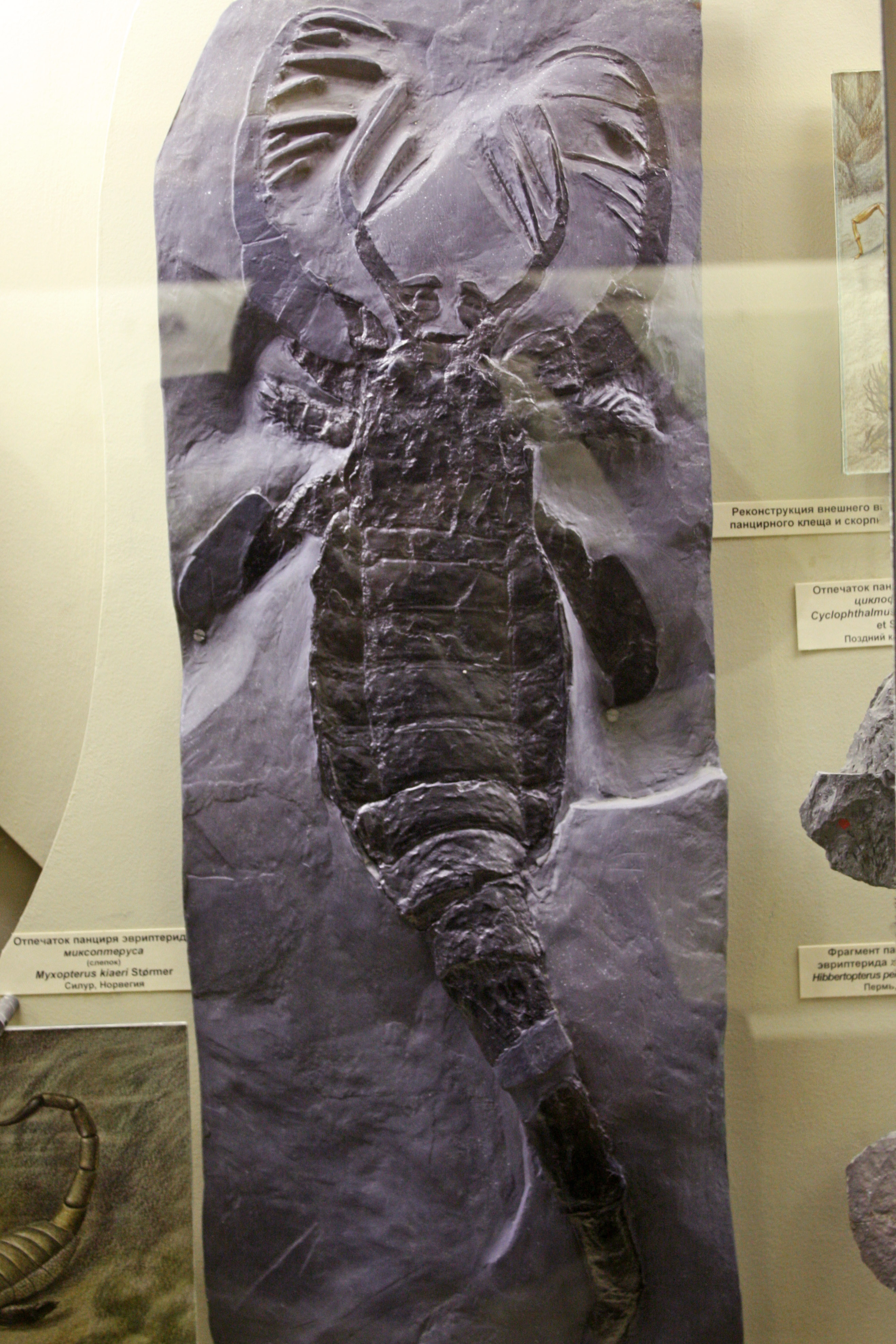
- Fossil of M. kiaeri exhibited at the Moscow Paleontological Museum.

Scientific classification
- Kingdom: Animalia
- Phylum: Arthropoda
- Subphylum: Chelicerata
- Order: †Eurypterida
- Superfamily: †Carcinosomatoidea
- Family: †Mixopteridae; Caster & Kjellesvig-Waering, 1955
- Genus: †Mixopterus; Ruedemann, 1921

Type species
- †Mixopterus multispinosus Ruedemann, 1921

Species
- †M. kiaeri Størmer, 1934; †M. multispinosus Ruedemann, 1921; †M. simonsoni Schmidt, 1883

= Mixopterus =

Mixopterus Temporal range: Late Silurian, 426.2–416 Ma

Extinct genus of arthropods

Mixopterus is a genus of eurypterid, an extinct group of aquatic arthropods. Fossils of Mixopterus have been discovered in deposits from Late Silurian age, and have been referred to several different species. Fossils have been recovered from two continents; Europe and North America. Mixopterus is the sole known representative of the eurypterid family Mixopteridae.

== Description ==
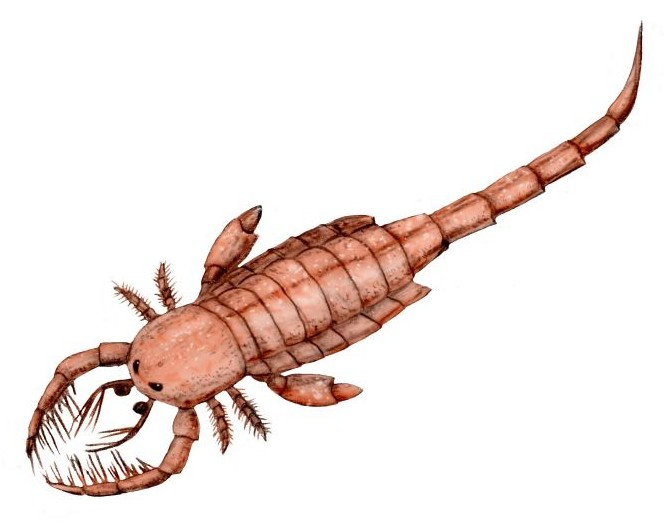
Life restoration of M. kiaeri.

Mixopterus was a medium-sized predatory eurypterid. The largest species, M. simonsoni, reached lengths of 75 cm (29.5 in). It was characterised by a robust exoskeleton with scattered tubercles or semicircular scales. The prosoma (head) was subquadrate, protruding antemedially. The chelicerae (claws in front of the mouth) were small. The two first pairs of legs of Mixopterus (appendages II and III) were highly specialized and not used for walking, instead being highly developed with long paired spines. The two following pairs (appendages IV and V) were moderately sized and typically spiniferous walking legs. The last legs, (VI), form a pair of swimming legs characteristic of the Eurypterida.

The preabdomen, the front portion of the body, was narrow with axial furrows, while the postabdomen was narrow. The telson was a curved spine. By thrusting and pushing the tail, the telson spine would be capable of stinging prey in between the front legs. The structure of the tail of indicates that Mixopterus would be able to move on land, but such movement would likely be difficult because of its weight. Respiration would not be an issue, since moist gills would be well concealed above the ventral plates. Mixopterus might have buried itself in the sand to wait for prey, as the swimming legs were very well-adapted for digging. The frontal legs and foremost portion of the prosoma, including the eyes, would have been kept above the substrate. When a prey was sufficiently close, the frontal appendages would be clasped together, almost forming a cage.

== Paleobiology ==
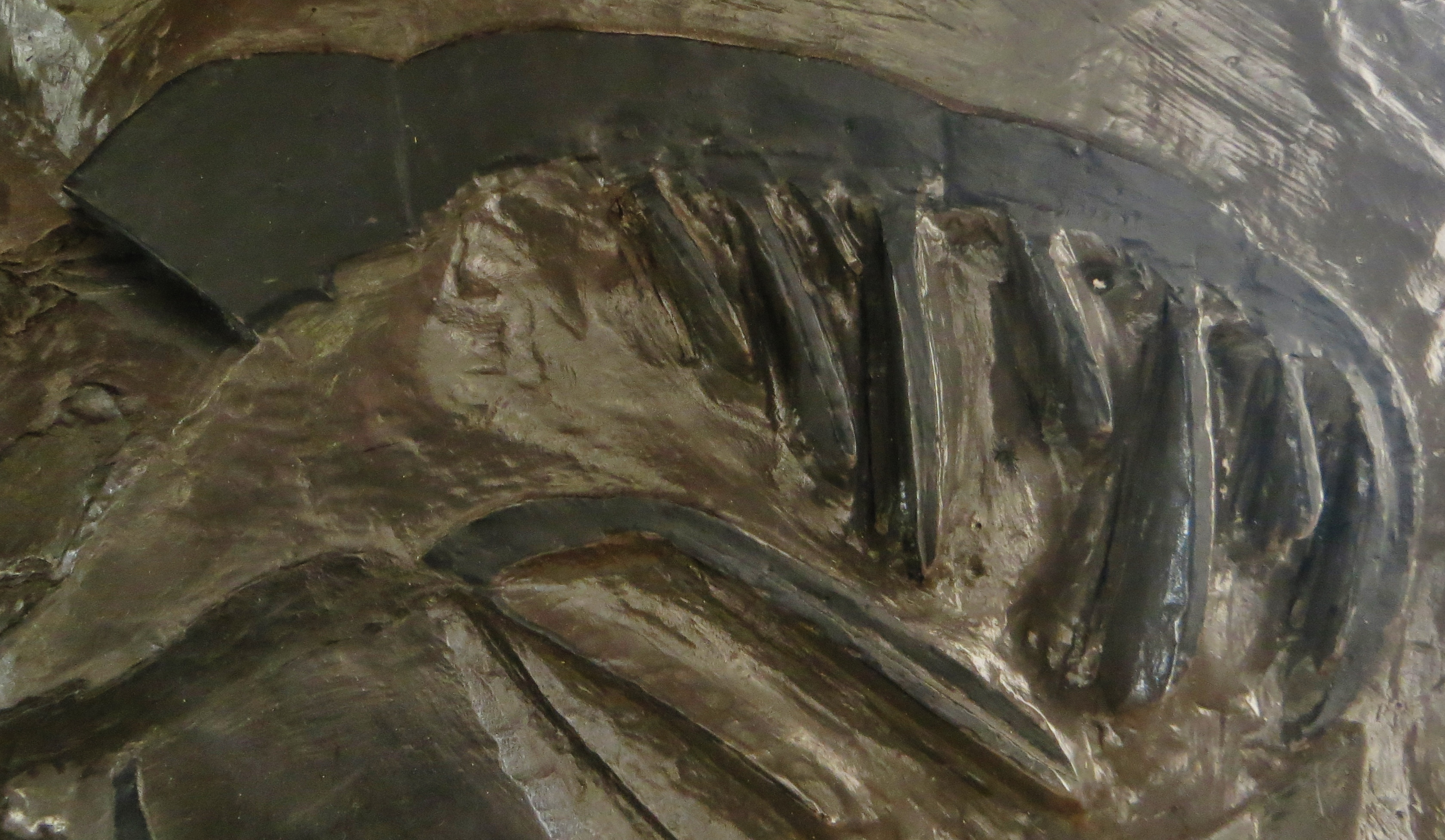
Frontal appendage of M. kiaeri with preserved spines.

=== Locomotion ===
Eurypterids with swimming legs were capable of both walking on the bottom of bodies of water or swimming through them. Unlike some highly derived eurypterines, Mixopterus is not thought to have been a good swimmer and it likely kept near the bottom. During swimming, the prosomal legs (appendages IV and V) were probably positioned backwards to produce minor lateral strokes. The swimming legs were likely used as flaps for moving vertically. It might have been able to push itself forward with rapid strokes of the ventral plates, but this is considered unlikely.

Mixopterus likely walked on the bottom with a gait similar to most insects. The two heavy and specialized frontal appendages, held above the bottom, would balance the weight of the long abdomen. The spread appendages would give a decent foothold, perhaps adjustable by raising the tail. On land, the raised tail would act as balance for the body. This was more important on land, as the weight of the body is larger without water.

=== Reproduction ===
Mixopterus preserves a long ventro-medially placed genital appendage. Mating in Mixopterus would likely be similar to that in horseshoe crabs. There is a presumed clasping organ on appendage II shaped as a flat and round lobee with a blade-shaped flat spine behind, overall similar to the clasping organs of Limulus. The male could then attach itself to the lateral corners of the last prosomal segment, and direct its long genital appendage to the point where the eggs were stored by the female.

== Species ==
Size comparison of the three species of Mixopterus

Mixopterus contains three valid species, with some others that historically have been assigned to it being recovered as outside of the genus. The species currently seen as valid species of the genus are:

- Mixopterus kiaeri Størmer, 1934 - Ringerike, Norway (Silurian)
- Mixopterus multispinosus Clarke & Ruedemann, 1912 - New York (Silurian)
- Mixopterus simonsoni Schmidt, 1883 - Saaremaa, Estonia (Silurian)

Invalid or reassigned species are listed below:

- Mixopterus dolichoschelus Peach and Horne, 1899 - Lanarkshire and Ayrshire, Scotland (Silurian), reclassified as its own genus, Lanarkopterus.

== Ichnology ==
Tracks attributed to Mixopterus have been discovered in fossil deposits in Ringerike, Norway. The tracks, referred to the ichnogenus Merostomichnites, were made by an arthropod in which only three pairs of legs took part in the gait, the last pair being swimming legs.

Swimming legs that constitute the last limbs of the prosoma are present in eurypterine eurypterids, out of which the only reasonably large taxa present in the silurian deposits of Ringerike are Mixopterus kiaeri and Erettopterus holmi. With its slender and spineless walking legs and short genital appendage, Erettopterus could not have produced the tracks, though they match the size and morphology of M. kiaeri rather well. The great morphological similarities as well as the relative abundance of M. kiaeri in the region prompted Hanken and Størmer (1975) to refer the tracks to Mixopterus.

== See also ==
- List of eurypterid genera
- Pterygotioidea
- Carcinosomatoidea
