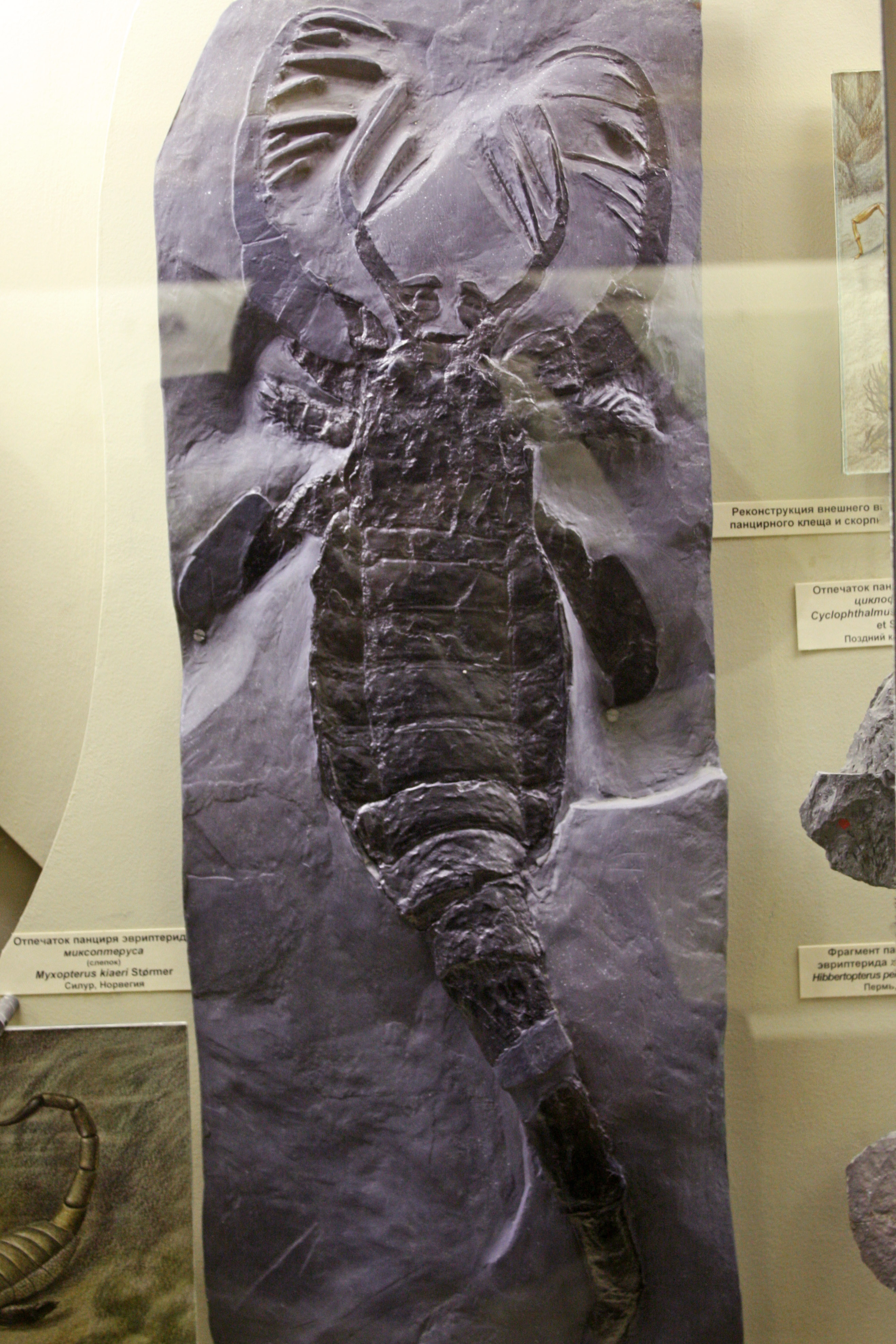
- Fossil of Mixopterus kiaeri exhibited at the Moscow Paleontological Museum.

Scientific classification
- Kingdom: Animalia
- Phylum: Arthropoda
- Subphylum: Chelicerata
- Order: †Eurypterida
- Infraorder: †Diploperculata
- Superfamily: †Carcinosomatoidea; Størmer, 1934

Families
- †Carcinosomatidae; †Lanarkopteridae; †Megalograptidae; †Mixopteridae

Synonyms
- Megalograptoidea Caster & Kjellesvig-Waering, 1955; Mixopteroidea Caster & Kjellesvig-Waering, 1955

= Carcinosomatoidea =

Carcinosomatoidea Temporal range: Middle Ordovician - Early Devonian, 467.3–412.3 Ma

Extinct superfamily of arthropods

Carcinosomatoidea is an extinct superfamily of eurypterids, an extinct group of chelicerate arthropods commonly known as "sea scorpions". It is one of the superfamilies classified as part of the suborder Eurypterina.

Some carcinosomatoid genera have been suggested to have been fully marine as opposed to living in near-shore brackish or hypersaline environments.

The majority of carcinosomatoid taxa are known from the paleocontinents of Laurentia, Baltica and Avalonia. Isolated and fragmentary fossils from the Late Silurian of Vietnam and the Czech Republic show that the terranes of Annamia and Perunica were within the geographical range of the carcinosomatoids. Only a few basal carcinosomatoids (e.g. Carcinosoma and Paracarcinosoma) have been found in deeper waters whilst the more derived forms, such as Mixopterus and Lanarkopterus have not. Basal carcinosomatoids (Carcinosomatidae) are likely responsible for the fossil remains in Vietnam and the Czech Republic and may have had a distribution similar to the cosmopolitan distribution of the pterygotioids, though they were not as common nor as successful.

== Classification ==
The Carcinosomatoidea have historically had a poorly resolved internal phylogeny, though can be easily recognised by scorpion-like appearance and heavily spinose appendages. Numerous characteristics support a close relationship to the Eurypteroidea. Although some carinosomatoids have historically been argued to be more basal, phylogenetic analyses recover Carcinosomatoidea as a monophyletic group.
