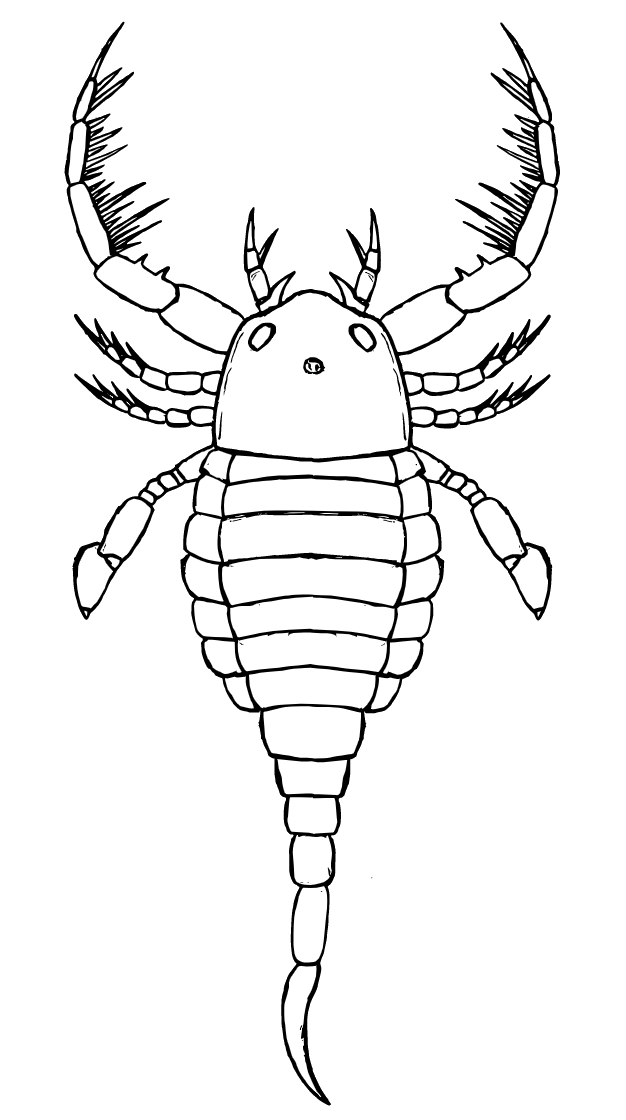
- Reconstruction of T. xiushanensis

Scientific classification
- Kingdom: Animalia
- Phylum: Arthropoda
- Subphylum: Chelicerata
- Order: †Eurypterida
- Superfamily: †Carcinosomatoidea
- Family: †Lanarkopteridae
- Genus: †Terropterus; Wang et al., 2021
- Species: †T. xiushanensis

Binomial name
- †Terropterus xiushanensis Wang et al., 2021

= Terropterus =

Terropterus Temporal range: Llandovery, 443.8–433.4 Ma

Extinct genus of arthropods

Terropterus is a genus of eurypterid, an extinct group of aquatic arthropods. The type and only species of Terropterus, T. xiushanensis, is known from deposits of Early Silurian age in China.

Terropterus was the earliest known and largest lanarkopterid eurypterid. Fossil specimens referred to T. xiushanensis are estimated to have reached up to 40 centimeters (15.7 in) in length, but other fossils, either representing older T. xiushanensis or a second species of Terropterus, demonstrate that members of the genus could reach upwards of at least 100 centimeters (3.3 ft) in length. Terropterus is the only lanarkopterid known from the ancient southern continent of Gondwana, with the other lanarkopterid, Lanarkopterus, only being known from what was once the northern continent of Laurussia. The discovery of Terropterus significantly expanded the known geographical and temporal ranges of the group.

The deposits in which fossils of Terropterus were discovered were once a marine environment. Fossils of several other groups are known from the same deposits, including trilobites, brachiopods, gastropods and other eurypterids. Due to its large size and its predatory adaptations, including large and spiny forward-facing appendages, Terropterus was likely the apex predator of its marine ecosystem.

== Description ==
Terropterus belonged to the family Lanarkopteridae, a group of eurypterids characterized by a superficially scorpion-like appearance and highly specialized and enlarged spiny forward-facing appendages, with the third pair of appendages of the group being particularly enlarged. The largest specimens referred to T. xiushanensis would in life have measured 40 centimeters (15.7 in) in length. Incomplete larger specimens from another locality, representing either older T. xiushanensis or possibly a second species of Terropterus, are estimated to have reached 100 centimeters (3.3 ft) in length. Given that relatively few specimens are known, it is possible that the larger Terropterus specimens were also not fully grown, and that adult Terropterus were even larger. At 100 centimeters in length, Terropterus was the largest lanarkopterid, much longer than Lanarkopterus (10 centimeters, 3.9 in, long).

Terropterus can be distinguished by the unique arrangement and the relative length of the spines on its third pair of appendages. The fourth podomere (leg segment) of this appendage had two spines, with the succeeding podomeres each having three long (every spine being of more or less the same length) spines arranged in an even manner. These three long spines on each podomere are also interlaced with additional shorter to moderately long spines. The preceding second pair of appendages were short and had several pairs of spines at their distal (furthest from the body) ends. The fourth and fifth pair of appendages had long and thin spines at the end of the podomeres, smaller than, but similar to, the third pair of appendages. In these limbs, the spines ran almost in parallel to the direction of the limbs. In addition to the features of the third appendage, additional features that distinguish Terropterus from its closest relatives are the shape of its coxae (base segment of the legs) and the proportional length of its podomeres.

== History of research ==
Map of the sites where the Terropterus fossils were discovered

Terropterus xiushanensis was described in 2021 by Han Wang, Jason Dunlop, Zhikun Gai, Xiaojie Lei, Edmund A. Jarzembowski and Bo Wang, based on fossils recovered from Llandovery-age (Early Silurian) deposits in the Xiushan Formation in Xiushan, South China. Several fossils were assigned to the new genus and species, including a telson (last segment of the body), a genital operculum (a structure on the underside of the body), including the genital appendage (the reproductive organ), as well as several prosomal (attached to the prosoma; head) appendages and coxae. A fossil preserving the second to sixth pair of appendages, enumerated NIGP 174785, was designated as the holotype specimen, with the other fossils designated as paratypes.

In addition to the fossils referred to T. xiushanensis, Wang and colleagues also described two larger, but more incomplete fossil specimens from Llandovery-age deposits (nearly of the exact same age as the Xiushan deposits) in the Fentou Formation in Wuhan, Central China. These fossils included a portion of the preabdomen (portion of the body preceding the abdomen), a carapace (head plate) and parts of the great third appendage. Because the spine patterns of the appendage and the proportions of the joints in the limb are more or less the same as in Xiushan fossils, they were referred, tentatively, to ‘Terropterus sp.’. Wang and colleagues noted that it was difficult to determine whether these fossils represent a different second species of Terropterus, or (since they were larger) an older individual of T. xiushanensis. Differences to the other fossils were noted to be much larger size as well as the spines on the appendage being proportionally longer and arranged more sparsely.

Prior to the discovery of Terropterus, only one lanarkopterid genus was known, Lanarkopterus, from Europe. In Lanarkopterus's time, Europe was part of the northern continent Laurussia. This meant that the morphological variety, evolutionary history and the geographical range of the group was relatively poorly known. The discovery of Terropterus, the only lanarkopterid known from the southern continent of Gondwana, as well as the oldest representative of the family, not only expanded knowledge on the morphological variety within the group but also extended the known temporal and geographical range. In particular, the discovery of Terropterus, and the possibility of finding more fossil material in the future, was noted by Wang and colleagues as indicating that the group may have had a more cosmopolitan (worldwide) distribution than previously assumed.

== Classification ==
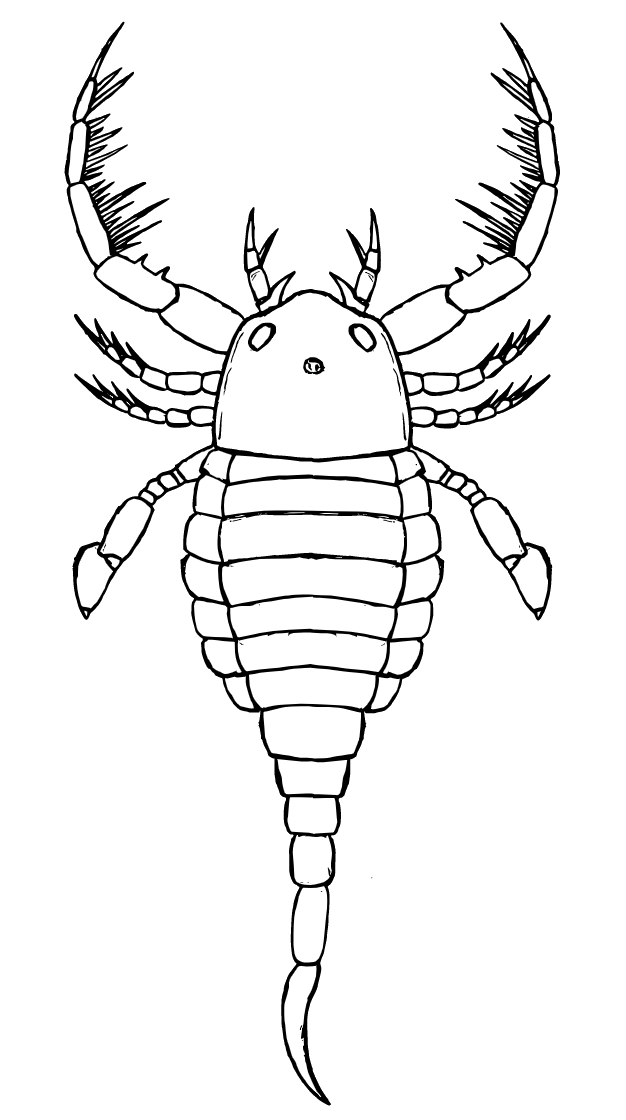
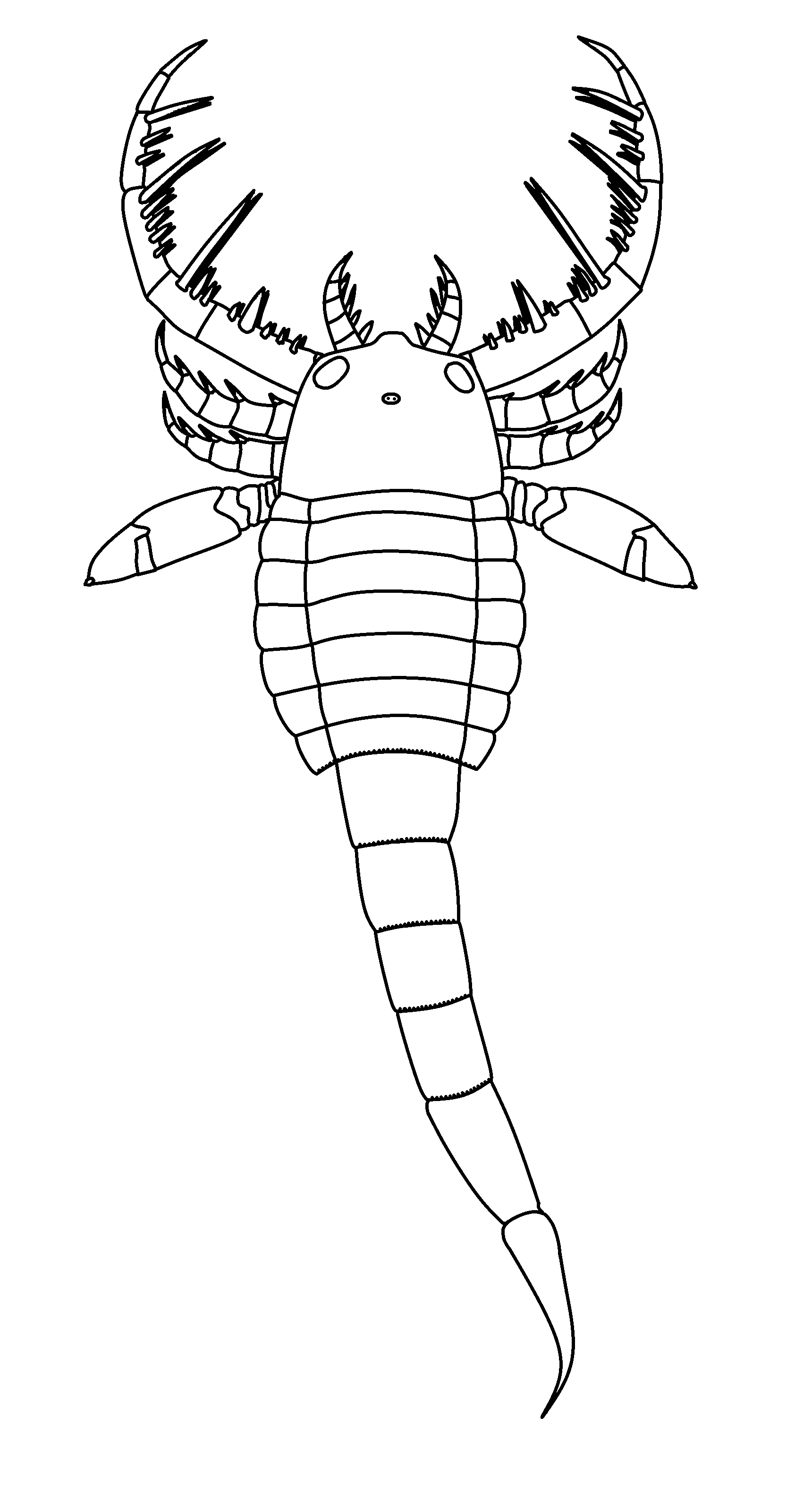
T. xiushanensis (left) compared to the closely related Lanarkopterus dolichoschelus (right)

Wang et al. classified Terropterus within the Mixopteridae, a family part of the Carcinosomatoidea superfamily. The specialized and spiny third appendages of Terropterus are known from both the Mixopteridae and the closely related Megalograptidae. Terropterus could confidently be placed in within the Mixopteridae due to its styliform (in this case scorpion-like) telson and the morphology of its fourth and fifth pair of appendages, which were of Hughmilleria-type, characteristic of the mixopterids. In the phylogenetic analysis by Wang and colleagues, Terropterus xiushanensis was recovered as the sister taxon of Lanarkopterus dolichoschelus, consistent with what was expected from its morphology. The cladogram below is adapted from a previous 2015 phylogenetic analysis by James Lamsdell and colleagues, noted by Wang and colleagues to be "largely congruent" with their results, with the addition of Terropterus in the position determined by Wang and colleagues.

- Carcinosomatoidea
  - - Megalograptidae
      - Pentecopterus decorahensis
      - - Echinognathus clevelandi
        - - Megalograptus williamsae
          - - Megalograptus ohioensis
            - Megalograptus welchi
    - - Mixopteridae
        - - Terropterus xiushanensis
          - Lanarkopterus dolichoschelus
        - - Mixopterus kiaeri
          - Mixopterus multispinosus
      - Carcinosomatidae
        - Holmipterus suecicus
        - Rhinocarcinosoma vaningeni
        - - - Carcinosoma newlini
            - Carcinosoma libertyi
          - - Eusarcana acrocephalus
            - Eusarcana scorpionis

In his 2025 eurypterid monograph, James Lamsdell classified Terropterus and Lanarkopterus in the distinct family Lanarkopteridae, closely related to the Mixopteridae (which per Lamsdell contains just Mixopterus).

== Paleoecology ==
Mixopterids such as Terropterus are believed to have been predatory animals. Their large and forward-facing appendages were presumably used to capture prey. Among modern arthropods, these appendages can be compared to the so-called "catching baskets" of the arachnids in the order Amblypygi, also formed by spiny appendages. Given the variety in the morphology of the large and spiny third appendage, not only within the Mixopteridae but also within the Carcinosomatoidea at large, it is possible that the arrangement and size of the spines and podomeres reflect different hunting strategies, or different sizes of prey animals. Because of its large size, large spiny appendages and a telson potentially capable of stinging prey and injecting venom (as possibly inferred from other mixopterid fossils), Terropterus is likely to have been the apex predator of its marine ecosystem. Other animals whose fossils have been preserved in the lower member (early Silurian portion) of the Xiushan Formation include the trilobite Luojiashania, the gastropods Coelozone and Hormotoma, the brachiopods Eospirifer, Leptostrophia, Nalivkinia and Nucleospira, as well as fragmentary remains of another eurypterid, of the Pterygotidae family.

== See also ==
- List of eurypterid genera
- Timeline of eurypterid research
