= Animals of Devonian Michigan =

Fossils of many types of water-dwelling animals from the Devonian period are found in deposits in the U.S. state of Michigan. Among the more commonly occurring specimens are bryozoans, corals, crinoids, and brachiopods. Also found, but not so commonly, are armored fish called placoderms, snails, sharks, stromatolites, trilobites and blastoids.

== Bryozoans ==
Bryozoans (moss animals) are a type of marine fossil commonly found in Michigan. They are often found in conjunction with corals, crinoids, and brachiopods, being extremely common in many places. Bryozoans vary in size greatly, from a few millimetres to several feet tall. In life they were filter feeders and competed with corals and crinoids for feeding space. Bryozoans came in three types: branching, encrusting, and fan-like bryozoans, and all are found in Michigan. By far the most common of these three types were branching bryozoans, which can be found by the hundreds at almost any Devonian marine site. These types are named for their slender, branch like shape and how they grow together in small forest-like groups. Encrusting bryozoans are also very common animals and are often found with brachiopods. Encrusting bryozoans get their name because they live on the shells and calcite skeletons of dead sea animals. When they attached themselves to the dead animals they would form a mat-like colony on the said animal. Then they would filter feed from the animals position in the water. Fan-like Bryozoans are the least common of the bryozoan types found in Michigan. They are found most often in association with crinoids and are common components of hash fossils. They are named for the broad, fan-like shape. They grew in abundance in reefs.

== Crinoids ==
Crinoids are among the most fascinating fossils found in Devonian Michigan deposits. Crinoids are filter-feeding echinoderms that evolved in the Ordovician period, they were extremely common during the Devonian Period. They grew from only a few inches tall to several feet tall, allowing the animal to take advantage of water filtered by no other animals. Crinoids were made of several parts, each played its own role in the crinoid's life.

The stem of the crinoid is made up of many disks stacked like poker chips to support the ball and arms of the crinoid. A crinoid disk laid horizontally is of circular form with many lines pointing inward to a small hole which would have carried nutrients and waste to and from the different parts of the crinoid. Disks are the most commonly preserved part of the crinoid, and can be found in the hundreds in hash fossils. They also can be found individually in many places, such as the Burkholder Road Site. The disks were made of hard calcite, which has formed most of today's limestone. Disks can also be found in groups called columns. Complete stems are sometimes found.

Crinoid “anchors” were the parts of the crinoid stem that attached the crinoid to a hard surface, such as a rock, to allow the animal to out-compete other filter-feeding animals in its ecosystem. A crinoid would have several anchors that were also made of disks. These are not rare, but are not commonly found in crinoid deposits.

Crinoid “arms” are long organs that came out of the crinoid ball. They filtered food particles from the water and are the rarest part of the crinoid. They looked like feathery arms, and they are the reason that crinoid are often called sea lilies. These arms were extremely delicate, and as a result they were rarely preserved.

The crinoid ball was a large cup shaped, calcite plated cup that held all of the crinoids organs. It was located at the top of the crinoid's stem, and some crinoid balls were adorned with spikes. Crinoid arms grew out of the crinoid ball. In a well-preserved specimen it is possible to see the spots where its feeding arms were attached. It is also possible to see the spot where the stem attached to the crinoid ball. Complete crinoid balls with tentacle attachments are very rare to find, but in some deposits many occur together. These deposits are usually limestone that was formed by very silty sediments, which makes it very soft (compared with some limestone, which is almost cement). The inside of a fossil crinoid usually consists of calcite crystals, because their skeletons were made of calcite. To be certain, one can look at the crystals under a microscope: if they are all in the shape of a rhombus, then they are calcite. Sometimes a crinoid is found that has been split in half, and specimens of this type are used in making jewelry pieces. When crinoid balls are found, they are usually in large compact groups.

Some species of crinoids possessed spikes that grew out of the crinoid ball. Spikes are rarely found in any deposits, due to how fragile they are. There are many possible explanations for why some crinoids possessed spikes: one of the most popular of these is that they served as a defense against predators.

== Corals ==
Corals were the most common animals found in Devonian Michigan. There were three types of coral found in Devonian Michigan: branching, colony, and solitary corals. These corals are found as fossils in almost every fossil site in Michigan. This is because the Devonian was a time of great reefs, which covered most of the world's oceans. Corals were a crucial element for these reefs, especially the Rugose corals. The extinction at the end of the Devonian destroyed the sponge reefs where they thrived, and major reef building did not resume until the Mesozoic. Rugose corals are the types of corals that grew as an isolated individual were extremely common in Devonian reefs. They made a horn-shaped skeleton out of calcite, adding a new layer every year. This makes it possible to determine the age of the coral when it died and the growth rate of the corals. They had several fleshy tentacles that captured small creatures, much like sea anemones. They had a varied growth range, from less than an inch to about a foot long. Finding large corals is hard because it takes decades for them to reach a foot long. These corals evolved during the Ordovician period and were common up until the Permian period, when they became extinct. This type of coral was one of the main reef builders of the Devonian, and was a crucial part of these ancient reefs. Colony or Tabulate corals are corals that consist of hundreds of individuals packed into one mass. They were generally filter feeders, and grew to very large sizes. A common example of a colony coral is Hexagonaria, more commonly called the Petoskey stone, is the state stone of Michigan. Its name refers to the hexagonal shape of each of its corallites. These corals are very easy to identify. There are also many different kinds of Favosites corals. One type is commonly called Honeycomb Coral, because of the small hexagonal corallites which look like honeycomb. These corals are quite common, and are found in many areas of Michigan.

Branching corals are the least common of all the types of corals found in Devonian Michigan deposits. Some types of Favosites grow in branching form (F.alpenensis, F.norwoodensis). (These can easily be confused with another completely different family of fossils called bryozoans. Bryozoans are not corals. See Bryozoan entry above).) Some other branching coral types are usually small, and are often found growing on brachiopods, like Aulocystus and Trachypora, and can be found at many fossil sites. They gain their name due to the fact they grew on stalks with branches. It is possible to find a branching coral in life position, although this is quite uncommon.

== Snails ==
Gastropods, or snails, are uncommon in Michigan's Devonian deposits. Usually all that is found are pieces of the shell, but it is possible to find complete specimens. Most of Michigan's fossil snails are small, but some grew to the size of a human head. It is also possible to find the gastropod Platyceras attached to a crinoid or brachiopod, indicating that they may have fed on their waste. Many of these gastropods fed on algae, and are often found in association with corals, crinoids, and bryozoans. The most frequent finds of gastropods in Michigan are at Burkholder Road ditch.

== Fish ==
The Devonian period is called the age of fishes. Large armored fish called Placoderms ruled the seas, and sharks were on the prowl for the first time. All that remains today are the armor plates, and the occasional body fossil of these fish. Remains of fossil placoderms in Michigan are rare, but the area between Alpena and Rogers City has yielded some pieces of armor. They usually look like flat blue flakes, but can be hard to distinguish from brachiopod pieces. To discern fish from brachiopod, one should look at the armor under a microscope: if striations or muscle scars are seen, this indicates a brachiopod. Unfortunately, not much work has been done on the fossil placoderms of Michigan.

Acanthodians are a type of ancient fish dating back the late Silurian period, often being called spiny sharks. Although they are not true sharks, they had spines on all of their fins, an important defensive adaptation. They were some of the first fish to evolve jaws, and their fossils are extremely rare. They are nearly impossible to find anywhere, and are not very well understood. They became extinct at the end of the Permian period, and outlasted the Placoderms and most other jaw-less fish.

== Sharks ==
Sharks first appeared in the mid Devonian period, and are extremely rare to find anywhere. A variety of teeth from these sharks, some long and sharp, and others flat, can be seen in the collection of Alma College. They were found in Ohio in the late 19th century. Also found from these primitive sharks are spines from their fins, which were probably used for defense. These sharks probably fed on fish, gastropods, brachiopods, and ammonoids.

== Stromatolites ==
Stromatolites are some of the oldest animals known. They can be found from Devonian deposits in the Lower Peninsula, and Stromatolites in the Upper Peninsula near Houghton are found in Precambrian deposits. They originated in the Archean, and thrived. A protective layer of slime kept them safe from the sun's rays, and they started releasing oxygen into the atmosphere. Stromatolites are formed in shallow water by the trapping, binding, and cementation of sedimentary grains by bio-films of microorganisms, especially cyanobacteria (blue green algae). These are usually found as large pieces of mounds, either as layers or as bumps on the rock surface. The bumps are on the outer layer of the animal while the layers are growth lines from the inside of the animal. Fossil stromatolites are found mostly in the northern area of the Lower Peninsula in Alpena. Living stromatolites are found in Shark Bay, Australia.

== Brachiopods ==
Brachiopods are shelled creatures that were quite common in the Devonian Period, in fact, these creatures were the dominant shelled creatures of the Paleozoic. There are currently 523 species living, but this is nothing compared to the 60,000 species known from the Paleozoic. They were composed of two halves that were fused at a hinge line. They were attached to the seafloor by a fleshy stalk. While common, brachiopods can be quite beautiful fossils when found complete, this is uncommon in brachiopods like Mucrosprifer, which are almost never found complete. Brachiopods were filter feeders, using a Lophophore to create a current to trap food particles. Many types of brachiopods can be found, these include the winged Mucrospirifer, Atrypa, Strophodonta, Cyrtina, Megastrophia, and Athrysis. They are often found in association with corals, crinoids, and bryozoans. Brachiopods were probably preyed upon by sharks, placoderms, ammonoids, straight cephalopods, and gastropods. Evidence for this predation comes from marks found on the shells of some specimens and the teeth of some animals.

== Straight-shelled cephalopods ==
These are some of the more primitive forms of shelled cephalopods. During the Ordovician these animals grew to huge sizes, some reaching the size of telephone poles. By the Devonian they had grown smaller, although they were still voracious predators. Some of these animals can be found in Michigan, but are pretty rare. They preyed on smaller shelled invertebrates, using their powerful tentacles and beak to crush the shells of their prey. They are named for their shells, which are shaped like long ice cream cones. Most of the specimens from Michigan are only a few inches to a foot long, but the occasional longer specimen can be found. Ammonoids are extremely rare fossils, and are it is even rarer to find a complete one. Even though their descendants were extremely successful during the Mesozoic Era, they and the Ammonites became extinct in the Cretaceous–Paleogene extinction event. They first evolved in the Devonian period, and soon became quite successful. They were cephalopods, and hunted mainly small shelled creatures, using their tentacles to pull their prey to their hard beak.

== Trilobites ==
Trilobites are an extinct group of ancient marine Arthropods that lived from the early Cambrian period (roughly 541 mya) to the great Permian extinction (252 mya). The name trilobite refers to the three lobes every trilobite body has: the axial lobe, running down the center of the animal, and the pleural lobes, located on either side of the axial lobe. The body is divided into three further parts, the Cephalon (head), the Thorax (body), and the Pygidium (tail). Trilobites are some of the only animals in the fossil record that can be found with eyes, this is due to the fact that the lenses in their eyes were covered with calcite. In fact, it is believed that trilobites bore the first eyes. Trilobites were extremely successful, occupying many ecological niches: such as scavengers and filter feeders. While their closest modern relative is perhaps the horseshoe crab, they bear close resemblance to the modern woodlouse. Much like many of today's arthropods, trilobites shed their exoskeleton periodically, meaning that one trilobite could leave several fossils of itself. Collecting trilobites requires extreme patience, as most specimens are incomplete pieces of molted exoskeleton. What is usually found from a trilobite is the tail or thorax, head pieces being less common. This is especially true for trilobites like Phacops, who split their cephalon open when molting. Trilobites were at their most successful during the Cambrian period, which is aptly named the age of trilobites. After that, they slowly started to decline. During the Ordovician period many new predators, such as the sea scorpions and large nautiloids evolved. To cope, trilobites started enrolling themselves for protection, along with growing vicious spines that would deter predators. They flourished during the Silurian, with 19 different families. Toward the end of this period they started to decline again, most likely because of the appearance of jawed fish. The trilobites experienced a rapid decline during the Devonian period, now falling prey to a host of well evolved predators. This included the sea scorpions, nautiloids, early sharks, placoderms, and acanthodians. No longer did enrolling protect them, many families became extinct very quickly. Trilobite numbers were declining even further during the Carboniferous and Permian periods, but they were not able to survive the great extinction which killed nearly all life on the planet.

== Blastoids ==
Blastoids are small marine echinoderms that originated in Ordovician period and became extinct at the end of the Permian. They were never as diverse as their cousins, the crinoids. They were very similar in anatomy to crinoids, having a stem attached to the seafloor while a head held their internal organs. Their head is what makes them easy to distinguish from crinoids, with a five pointed “star” on their theca. At the top of the head there were five small holes, through which food would be ingested and waste products discharged. While common in the early Carboniferous, blastoids are extremely rare in Michigan, occasionally they have been found at the Burkholder in Alpena.
