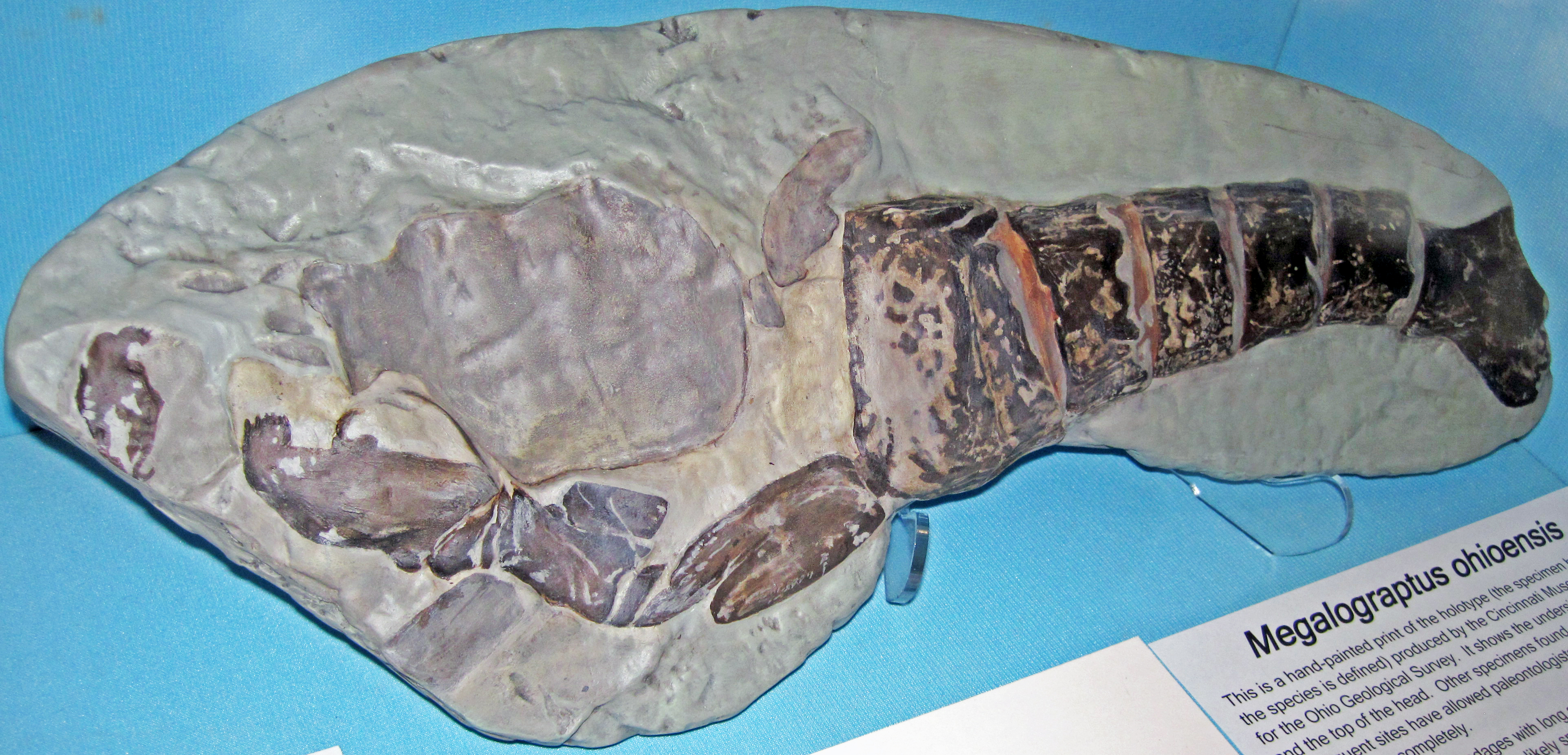
- Replica of the M. ohioensis holotype, Orton Geology Museum

Scientific classification
- Kingdom: Animalia
- Phylum: Arthropoda
- Subphylum: Chelicerata
- Order: †Eurypterida
- Superfamily: †Carcinosomatoidea
- Family: †Megalograptidae
- Genus: †Megalograptus; Miller, 1874

Type species
- †Megalograptus welchi Miller, 1874

Species
- †M. alveolatus (Shuler, 1915); †M. ohioensis (Caster & Kjellesvig-Waering, 1955); †M. shideleri (Caster & Kjellesvig-Waering, 1964); †M. welchi (Miller, 1874); †M. williamsae (Caster & Kjellesvig-Waering, 1964)

= Megalograptus =

Megalograptus Temporal range: Katian, 453–445.2 Ma

Extinct genus of arthropods

Megalograptus is a genus of eurypterid, an extinct group of aquatic arthropods. Fossils of Megalograptus have been recovered in deposits of Katian (Late Ordovician) age in North America. The genus contains five species: M. alveolatus, M. ohioensis, M. shideleri, M. welchi and M. williamsae, all based on fossil material found in the United States. Fossils unassigned to any particular species have also been found in Canada. The generic name translates to "great writing" and originates from the mistaken original belief that Megalograptus was a type of graptolite, often given names ending with -graptus (meaning 'writing').

Megalograptus was a large predatory megalograptid eurypterid, with the largest and best known species, M. ohioensis, reaching body lengths of 78 centimeters (2 ft 7 in). Some species were substantially smaller, with the smallest, belonging to a hitherto undetermined species, only growing to about 10 cm (3.9 in) in length. Morphologically, Megalograptus was highly distinct. The two most distinctive features of Megalograptus were its massive and spined forward-facing appendages, far larger than similar structures in other eurypterids, and its telson (the last division of the body). The sharp spike-shaped telson of Megalograptus was not venomous, but it was specialized in that it was surrounded by unique cercal blades, capable of grasping. Certain fossils of three different species, M. ohioensis, M. shideleri and M. williamsae, are so well-preserved that researchers have been able to infer the coloration they might have possessed in life. All three were deduced to have been brown and black in color, with M. ohioensis being darker than the others.

First described by Samuel Almond Miller in 1874, based on fragmentary fossil remains of the species M. welchi, Megalograptus being a graptolite was not formally questioned until 1908, when Rudolf Ruedemann recognized the fossils as eurypterid remains. Megalograptus was noted as being similar to Echinognathus by August Foerste in 1912 and the two genera have been considered closely related since then, and have been grouped together in the Megalograptidae since 1955. In 2015, the genus Pentecopterus was also assigned to the family. Kenneth E. Caster and Erik N. Kjellesvig-Waering revised Megalograptus in 1955, owing to the discovery of more complete fossil material of the new species M. ohioensis. Caster and Kjellesvig-Waering conducted further work on Megalograptus over the following years. In 1964, they named the species M. shideleri and M. williamsae and reclassified the fragmentary eurypterid Ctenopterus alveolatus as a species of Megalograptus.

Megalograptus lived in near-shore marine environments, where it used its large appendages, and possibly its telson and cercal blades, to capture prey. Possible coprolites (fossilized dung) are known from M. ohioensis, which contain fossil trilobite fragments as well as fragments of M. ohioensis itself. This suggests that Megalograptus might have been cannibalistic at times, like many modern chelicerates.

== Description ==
=== Size ===
The size of the largest and smallest specimens of M. ohioensis, the largest and best known species of Megalograptus, compared to a human

Megalograptus was a genus of large megalograptids. The largest species was M. ohioensis, which ranged in length from 49 to 78 centimeters (1 ft 7 in to 2 ft 7 in). M. ohioensis was the second largest megalograptid and the second largest eurypterid of the Ordovician period, smaller only than the related Pentecopterus, which could grow to 170 cm (5 ft 7 in). Previous estimates have placed the size of some species of Megalograptus as substantially larger, with the type species M. welchi once believed to have reached lengths of 150 cm (4 ft 11 in) in length. According to a 2009 study by James Lamsdell and Simon J. Braddy, such estimates are dubious as they are based on ornamentation in incomplete fossils. In the case of M. shideleri, once estimated to have reached lengths of 200 cm (6 ft 7 in), the size estimate was based only on two fragmentary tergites (upper portions of body segments), wherein the dimensions of the ornamental scales were unusually large, interpreted as suggesting a giant body size. The fact that scales can vary in size across the bodies of megalograptid eurypterids and that one of the relevant tergites of M. shideleri was not longer than 3 cm (1.2 in) suggests that this species did not reach lengths of more than 56 cm (1 ft 10 in). The length of the species M. alveolatus is uncertain, but it was much smaller than M. ohioensis, and M. williamsae grew to about 50 cm (1 ft 8 in). The smallest known species of Megalograptus was an as yet undescribed Canadian species which only grew to 10 cm (3.9 in) in length.

=== Morphology ===
Megalograptus was morphologically unique and easily distinguishable from other eurypterids. The carapace (head plate) of Megalograptus was vaguely quadratic in shape and flattened, lacking a marginal rim, which was present in some other eurypterids. At the front of the carapace there was a downturn and six small downward-facing spikes, possibly an adaptation for digging in the mud. The compound eyes of Megalograptus were medium-sized and reniform (kidney-shaped), located close to the edge of the carapace. The ocelli (simple eyes located more centrally) were small. Some of the appendages of Megalograptus unusually had one more joint than was common in eurypterids.

Among the appendages, the third pair (counting the simple chelicerae, pincers or mouth parts, as the first pair) are the most notable. In Megalograptus these were massive structures, covered in pairs of great spines, only comparable to the same structures in Mixopterus, another eurypterid. The appendages of Megalograptus, about 3.5 times the length of the carapace, were significantly larger than those of Mixopterus. On the fourth joint of the appendages, one pair of spines end in bulbous structures, rather than sharp points, and were perhaps sensory. This third pair, presumably used for seizing and constraining prey, had notable flexibility, indicating that its hypertrophied spines would have been used to hold prey and bring them to chelicerae and the coxal gnathobases, so that the second pair then could rip the immobilized prey.

The fourth pair of appendages were short and spiny, but the fifth pair, immediately preceding the swimming paddles (placed on the sixth and final pair of appendages), were completely spineless. This unusual limb is similar to the same appendage in the distantly related genus Eurypterus, where it has been interpreted as a balancing organ. The third joint of the swimming paddles of Megalograptus bent the appendages forwards, a rare feature in the eurypterids, otherwise mostly known from the distantly related genus Dolichopterus. The wide swimming paddles of Megalograptus were formed from the sixth joint of the appendage. The seventh joint, which in many genera formed a major part of the paddle, was reduced to a relatively small structure. The eighth joint, not preserved in any known Megalograptus fossil material, is indicated as existing by attachment points in the seventh joint, which also indicate that it was significantly smaller than in other eurypterids.

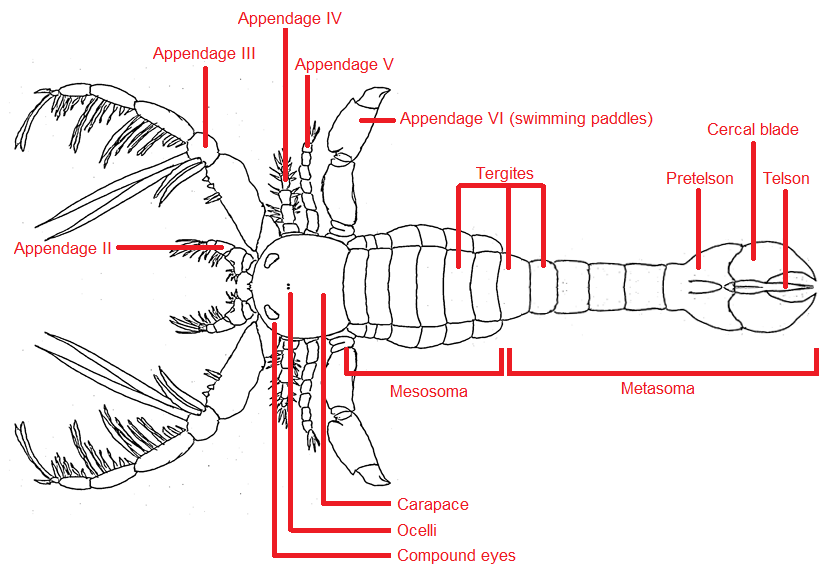
Anatomical diagram of the upper side of M. ohioensis, featuring some of the body parts mentioned in the text

The mesosoma of Megalograptus (the first six segments after the head) was distinctly similar to the same segments in modern scorpions and different from the mesosomas of other eurypterids. The body contracted after the last segment of the mesosoma, rather than after the first segment of the metasoma (the last six segments), which was otherwise typical for eurypterids. In most eurypterids, the mesosoma was widest at the fourth or fifth segment, but in Megalograptus it was widest at the third. The first segment of the mesosoma was considerably shorter than the succeeding segments, which were otherwise approximately of the same length. The last few segments of the body were slightly longer than the preceding segments. The metastoma (a large plate located on the underside of the body) of Megalograptus was roughly egg-shaped, unusually wide and broadly subtriangular (almost triangular) in shape, differentiating it from the same structure in all other eurypterids, where it was usually cordate (heart-shaped).

The most unusual feature of Megalograptus was the structure formed by the telson (the last division of the body) and the immediately preceding segment (the pretelson). Megalograptus had, alongside the sharp and stout telson spike, two paired and rounded blade-formed lobes, the so-called cercal blades. These were attached beneath the telson, directly to the pretelson. The blades were capable of articulation, in effect forming a large grasping organ. In other eurypterids, the telson tends to be an undivided structure in the shape of a paddle or spike, meaning that the cercal blades distinguish Megalograptus from nearly all other eurypterids. Cercal blades are only known from one other eurypterid, Holmipterus, and are lacking in the basal ("primitive") megalograptid Pentecopterus. Taken together with the telson, the telson–pretelson assemblage of Megalograptus forms a flattened structure, superficially similar to the flattened telsons of many genera in the superfamily Pterygotioidea.

Megalograptus was ornamented with small scales of irregular size across its body. On the carapace, they were flat and disc-like and scattered without any obvious pattern. On the fifth pair of appendages, the scales were more elongated. On the main body, the scales were rounded, raised and nearly elliptical in shape. Many of the scales on the carapace, the fifth pair of appendages, the mesosoma and metasoma and some on the appendages had holes in their center, suggesting that they once supported bristles (stiff hairs). In life, Megalograptus may have had an almost hirsute (hairy) appearance.

=== Coloration ===
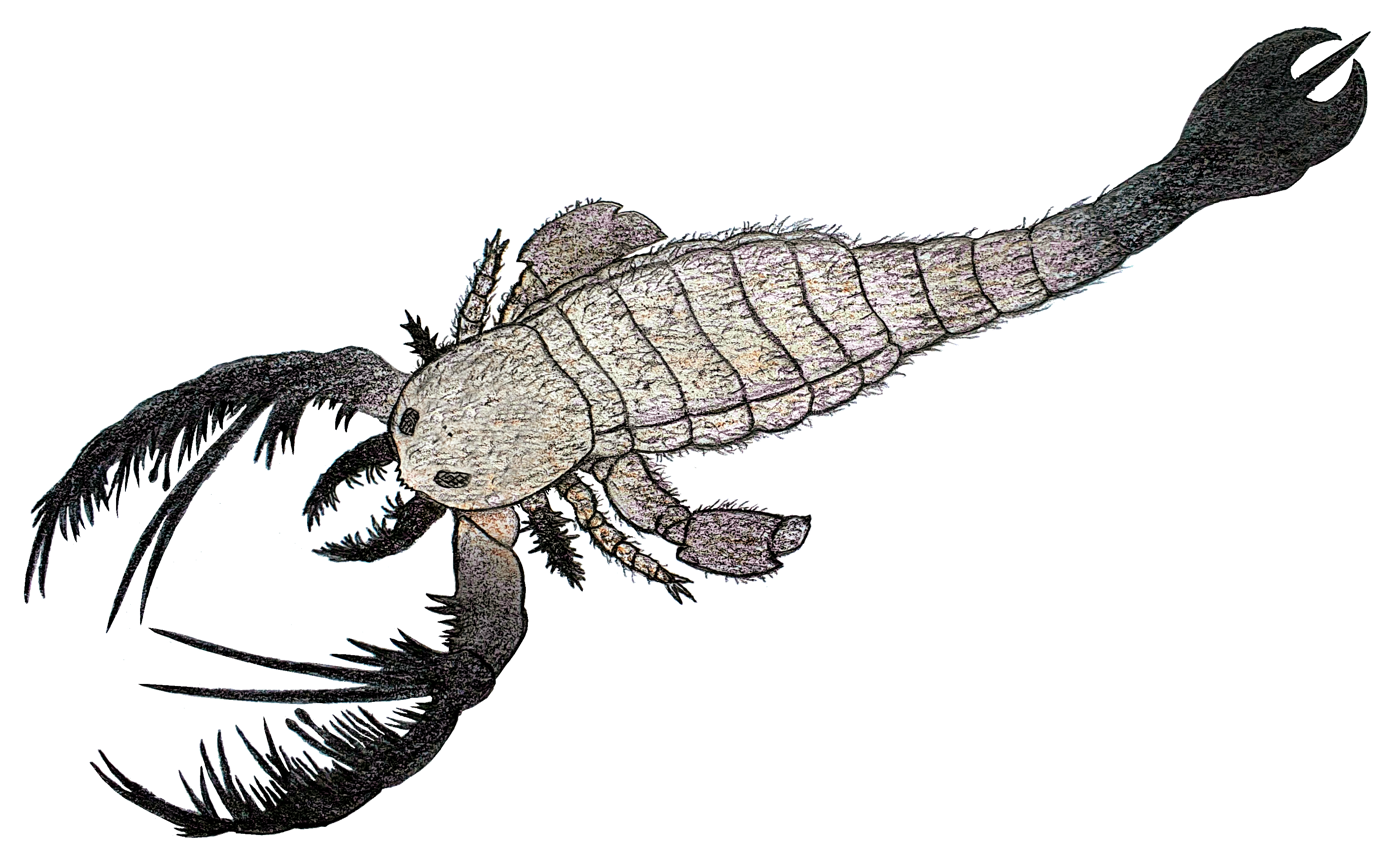
M. ohioensis, depicted with bristles and its inferred dark brown and black life coloration, per its 1964 description by Caster and Kjellesvig-Waering.

In the 1964 description of M. ohioensis, M. shideleri and M. williamsae, Kenneth E. Caster and Erik N. Kjellesvig-Waering made inferences of the life coloration of the species based on a collection of well-preserved specimens. In some fossils of M. shideleri, the fossils retained their original coloration, with no replacement having taken place (meaning that mineralization during fossilization did not distort the original color scheme of the fossils). M. shideleri was brown, with scales varying in color from dark brown to black and the integument (the scales) was a lighter brown color. A similar, but darker, brown and black color scheme has been inferred for M. ohioensis, and its fossils being better preserved allows for more detailed examination. M. williamsae also had a similar color scheme, with its tergites indicating black scales against light brown integument. The colors of Megalograptus inferred by Caster and Kjellesvig-Waering are similar to those inferred by Kjellesvig-Waering of Carcinosoma newlini, another eurypterid also inferred to have been brown and black, in 1958.

According to Caster and Kjellesvig-Waering, M. ohioensis was mostly dark brown, with some black elements. Though no obvious integument pattern has been determined, most of the body, including the head, had dark brown integument, contrasted by black scales. The coxae (base segments of the appendages) were dark brown, with black scales and black gnathobases ("tooth plates" surrounding the mouth). As such, the appendages began as dark brown in color, but quickly darkened towards their ends. Most of the appendages of larger specimens, including the spiny and large forelimbs, were almost entirely black in color and with black spines, although in smaller specimens, the appendages were typically lighter in color. Connective tissue in the appendages was pale brown in color. The appendage immediately preceding the swimming paddles was not entirely black, instead just darkening to a very dark brown. The metastoma was dark brown, with black scales, postules (small elevations) and mucrones (tiny spines). The telson of M. ohioensis, as well as much of the preceding segment, was entirely black in color.

== History of research ==
=== Type material ===
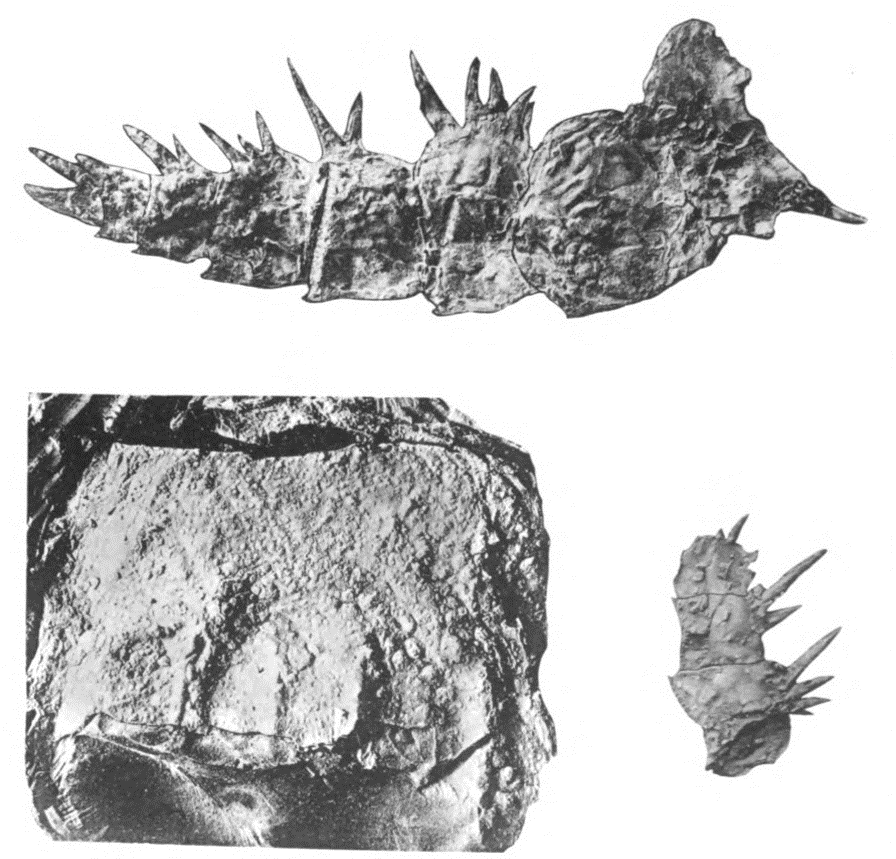
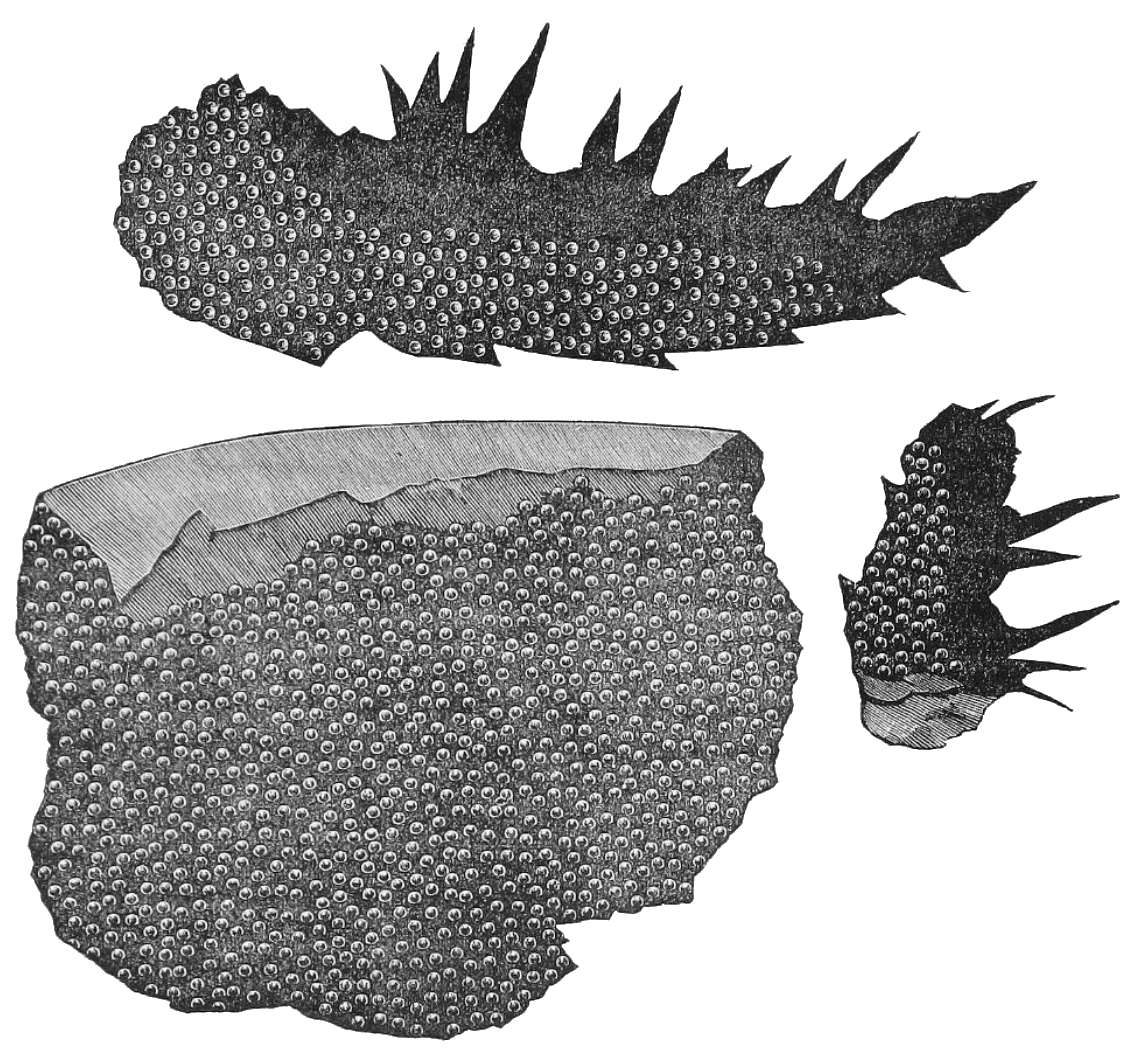
The M. welchi type material; a "walking leg" (top), a fragmentary "walking leg" (bottom right) and a postabdominal segment (bottom left) (left) and the same fossils illustrated by Miller in 1874 as remains of a graptolite, covered in "polyp cells" (right)

Fossils of Megalograptus were first described by Samuel Almond Miller in 1874. Miller mistakenly believed the fossil material, consisting of a postabdominal (segments 8–12) tergite and two fragments of an appendage, was the integument of a graptolite (a member of Graptolithina, a group of colonial pterobranchs), and gave it the name Megalograptus, meaning "great writing" (deriving from the Greek megale, "great", and graptos, "writing", commonly used for graptolite fossils). One reason for Miller's mistaken identification is that the exact outline of the fossils was unclear because they were not properly cleaned yet.

The fragmentary fossils of M. welchi were initially recovered by L. B. Welch, whom the species name welchi honors, near Liberty, Ohio, in rocks of Katian (Late Ordovician) age of the Elkhorn Formation. With the exception of the type material, M. welchi is only fragmentarily known. It is probable that more fossils could have been uncovered if it had been immediately recognized as a large eurypterid. By the time it was recognized as such and the fossils were deemed to be of interest, further work at the fossil site had irreversibly damaged what remained of the eurypterid fossils.

The status of Megalograptus as a graptolite was first questioned in 1908 by Rudolf Ruedemann, who was researching Ordovician graptolites. Ruedemann instead recognized the remains of M. welchi as eurypterid fossils. That same year, Ruedemann's suspicions were confirmed in discussions with August Foerste and Edward Oscar Ulrich, who also agreed that the fossils were of a eurypterid. Foerste was invited to contribute with his understanding of Megalograptus to Ruedemann's and John Mason Clarke's 1912 monograph The Eurypterida of New York. He recognized Megalograptus as similar to the eurypterid Echinognathus clevelandi, assuming them to either be related or of the same genus. The features uniting the two were noted to be the spines of the appendages, the scaly ornamentation and the longitudinal ridges of the preserved segment. Foerste also noted that the fossils of M. welchi were not morphologically distinct enough from other eurypterids to differentiate it, with its earlier age instead serving as the main distinction of the genus and species.

=== Additional fossils ===
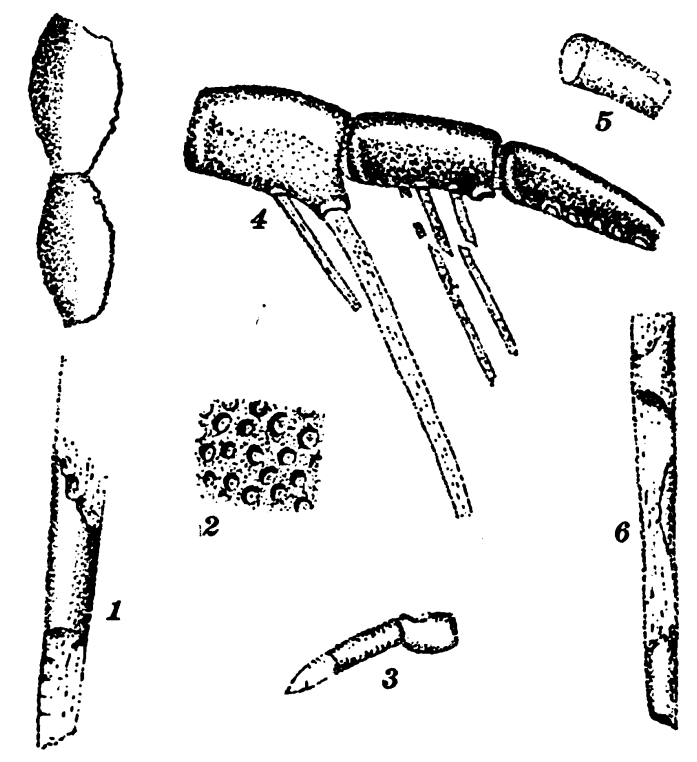
The fragmentary fossil type material of M. alveolatus, originally assigned to the genus Ctenopterus

Megalograptus was considerably revised in 1955 by Caster and Kjellesvig-Waering in Leif Størmer's 1955 Treatise on Invertebrate Paleontology, from which the modern understanding of the genus originates. The revision was made possible with the discovery of new fossil material, consisting of what at the time was the best preserved Ordovician eurypterid fossil material discovered. These fossils, found in deposits of Katian age alongside the Ohio River road (U.S. Route 52), approximately 14.5 kilometres (9.0 mi) north of Manchester, Ohio, were assigned to a new species, M. ohioensis. The type material of M. welchi was compared to the new fossils by Caster and Kjellesvig-Waering, though only in the "walking legs" (i.e. the second to fifth pair of appendages) given that they were the only body part preserved for both M. welchi and M. ohioensis. While recognized as being of the same genus, Caster and Kjellesvig-Waering also noted differences, supporting the species distinction of M. welchi and M. ohioensis, including the leg of M. welchi being stouter, with thicker and shorter spines, and some differences in the joints (in M. welchi, the second joint had spines, which it did not in M. ohioensis, and in M. welchi, the spine-shaped ultimate joint was blunt and thick, whereas it was slender in M. ohioensis).

In 1964, Caster and Kjellesvig-Waering named two new species of Megalograptus based on additional fossil material from the Katian of Ohio: M. shideleri and M. williamsae. M. shideleri was named based on fragmentary fossil specimens originally found by William H. Shideler in the Saluda Formation near Oxford, Ohio, and in Indiana. The species is named in his honor. M. shideleri differs from M. ohioensis in that its gnathobases have fewer denticles and a much more developed second tooth. The M. shideleri fossils could not be compared to the type material of M. welchi as there is no overlap in the preserved body parts. M. williamsae was named based on a cercal blade, alongside fragments of tergites and appendages, discovered in the Waynesville Formation, near Clarksville, Ohio, by Carrie Williams, whom the species name honors. M. williamsae differs from M. ohioensis in its cercal blades, with a slightly different pattern of scales and longer, narrower and sharper end points, rather than the more acute, hooked and stouter end points in M. ohioensis.

The species M. alveolatus was originally named as a species of the very distantly related Ctenopterus by Ellis W. Shuler in 1915, based on fossil fragments, including of the appendages and the telson spike, collected in Late Ordovician deposits along Walker Mountain in Virginia belonging to the Bays Formation. It was the first eurypterid to be described from Virginia. The species name alveolatus refers to the pronounced development of the alveolar processes (pits) around the spines. Because of the fragmentary state of its fossils, M. alveolatus has had a complex taxonomic history. Although Kjellesvig-Waering initially believed that it might have been a species of Mixopterus, tentatively designating it as "Mixopterus (?) alveolatus", Caster and Kjellesvig-Waering assigned the species to Megalograptus in 1964, arguing that the morphology of the appendage described by Shuler in 1915 demonstrated that the fossils undoubtedly belonged to Megalograptus. M. alveolatus was kept as a distinct species on account of the third joint of the appendage being proportionally larger than the same joint in M. ohioensis.

In addition to the five described species assigned to the genus, there may be as many as four distinct undescribed species of Megalograptus. Caster and Kjellesvig-Waering noted in 1964 that there were very fragmentary eurypterid fossils known from the Katian-age deposits of the Whitewater Formation near Oxford, Ohio, referring these specimens to Megalograptus. In 2002, fossils belonging to a small variety of Megalograptus were first reported from Katian-age deposits of the Nicolet River Formation in Quebec, Canada. Megalograptus fossils found in Katian-age deposits in the US state of Georgia and in the Shawangunk Ridge of New York may also represent two distinct new species. Additionally, fossils potentially referrable to Megalograptus have been reported from the Martinsburg Formation of New York and Pennsylvania.

== Classification ==
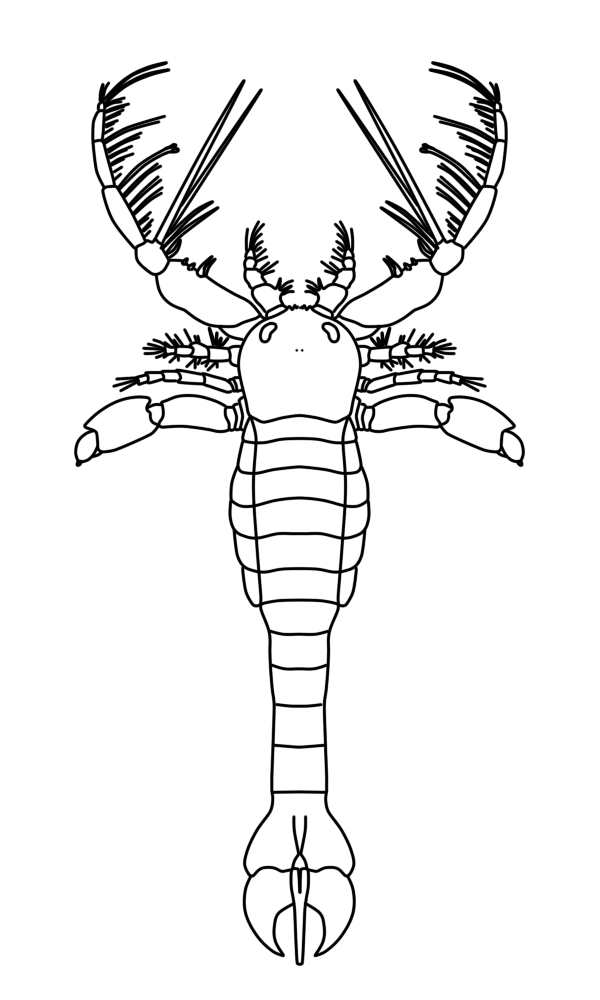
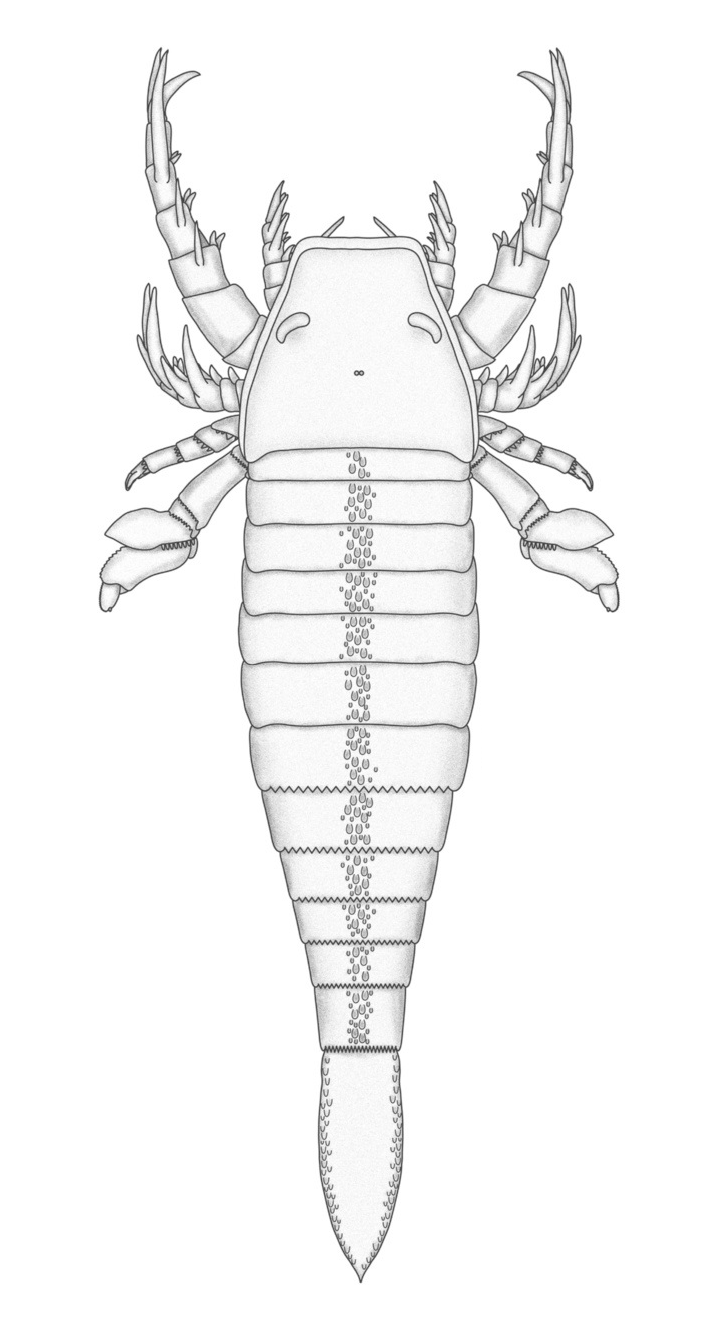
M. ohioensis (left) compared to the earliest and basalmost known member of the Megalograptidae, Pentecopterus decorahensis (right)

Shortly after being recognized as a eurypterid in the early 20th century, Megalograptus was noted by Foerste in 1912 as being similar, and likely closely related, to the genus Echinognathus. In 1934, Størmer classified Megalograptus and Echinognathus, together with the genera Mixopterus and Carcinosoma, into the family Carcinosomatidae. The taxonomy was amended by Erik N. Kjellesvig-Waering in 1955, who transferred Mixopterus to its own family, the Mixopteridae, and placed Megalograptus and Echinognathus in their own family, the Megalograptidae. The Megalograptidae has traditionally been interpreted as closely related to the Mixopteridae. In 1964, Caster and Kjellesvig-Waering placed Megalograptidae, alongside Mixopteridae, Carcinosomatidae and Mycteroptidae, into the superfamily Mixopteracea (later renamed to Mixopteroidea). In 1989, Victor P. Tollerton, perceiving them to be distinct enough, placed the Megalograptidae into their own superfamily, the Megalograptoidea.

In 2004, O. Erik Tetlie determined Megalograptus, and by extension the Megalograptidae, to be taxonomically problematic, perceiving the genus to share several potential synapomorphies (derived, "advanced", traits unique to a clade) with both the Eurypteroidea and the Mixopteroidea (now considered a synonym of Carcinosomatoidea), as well as having a large number of apomorphies (characteristics different from what existed in the ancestor of an organism). Depending on how the analysis was conducted, Megalograptus changed position in the phylogenetic tree, only sometimes being recovered as basal within the Mixopteroidea (if taxa where less than one third of the body was preserved were removed). Tetlie speculated that Megalograptus and its family could be very basal, given their early age, retaining Megalograptoidea as a distinct superfamily, though with a highly uncertain phylogenetic position, either very basal, between the Onychopterelloidea and the Eurypteroidea, or more derived, between the Eurypteroidea and the Mixopteroidea. No phylogenetic analysis ever recovered Megalograptus in these positions and the genus was often excluded from analyses due to its perceived strange mix of features.

The description of Pentecopterus, the only other genus in the Megalograptidae, in 2015 by Lamsdell and colleagues saw the megalograptids again considered to be close relatives of the mixopterids and carcinosomatids. The phylogenetic analysis accompanying the description of the new genus resolved the Megalograptidae as basal within the relatively derived Carcinosomatoidea superfamily, which also includes the Carcinosomatidae and Mixopteridae. The cladogram below is simplified from the study by Lamsdell et al. (2015), collapsed to only display the Carcinosomatoidea.

- Carcinosomatoidea
  - - Megalograptidae
      - Pentecopterus decorahensis
      - - Echinognathus clevelandi
        - - Megalograptus williamsae
          - - Megalograptus ohioensis
            - Megalograptus welchi
    - - Mixopteridae
        - Lanarkopterus dolichoschelus
        - - Mixopterus kiaeri
          - Mixopterus multispinosus
      - Carcinosomatidae
        - Holmipterus suecicus
        - Rhinocarcinosoma vaningeni
        - - - Carcinosoma newlini
            - Carcinosoma libertyi
          - - Eusarcana acrocephalus
            - Eusarcana scorpionis

== Paleoecology ==
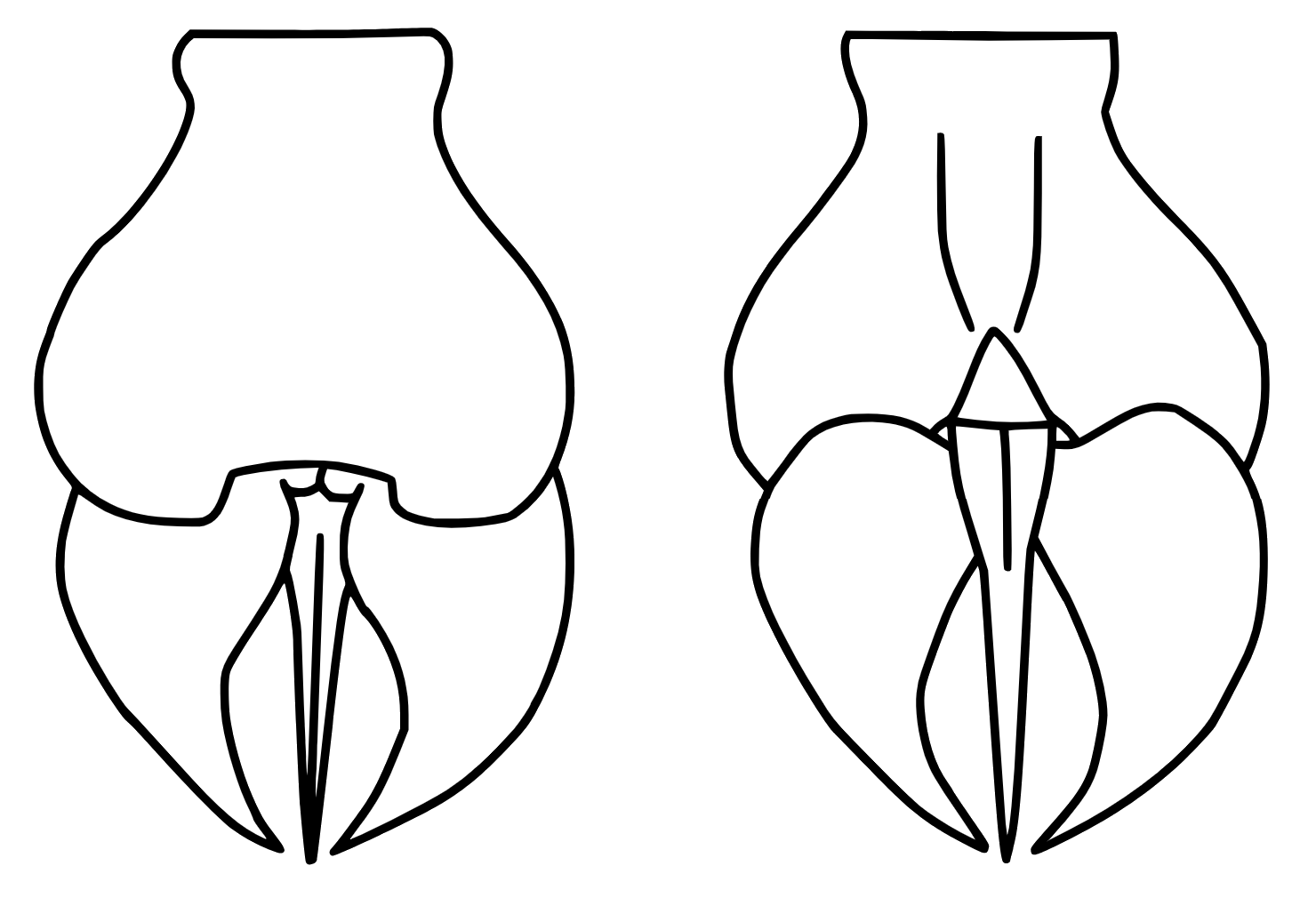
Simplified reconstruction of the telson-pretelson assemblage of M. ohioensis, possibly used for grasping, viewed from below (left) and above (right)

Discovered alongside specimens of M. ohioensis were tube-like structures containing fossil fragments of the trilobite Isotelus and of eurypterids, including M. ohioensis itself, interpreted as coprolites (fossilized dung). Based on its foraging strategy which would have suited for consuming flat organisms, Megalograptus may have hunted pelagic soft-bodied prey such as freshly-molted trilobites, sea jellies, ctenophores, and other nektobenthic taxa; given that it likely didn't have fortified gnathobases, it is considered unlikely that Megalograptus would have been able to crush shelled, bio-mineralized organisms. Because of the large size of the coprolites and the presence of fossil material of M. ohioensis in and around them, it has been suggested that they are coprolites of M. ohioensis itself, thus representing evidence of cannibalism. Because cannibalism is prevalent in modern chelicerates, such as spiders and scorpions (particularly in mating situations), it is possible that eurypterids would have practiced cannibalism as well. Similar coprolites assigned to the eurypterid Lanarkopterus dolichoschelus, also from the Ordovician of Ohio, contain, in addition to remains of jawless fish, fragments of smaller specimens of Lanarkopterus itself. If the coprolites belong to Megalograptus, they also further indicate that the genus had a carnivorous diet. The large spines on its third pair of appendages already indicate that Megalograptus was predatory, as they were presumably used for active prey capture, to grasp prey and move it to the mouth. The third pair of appendages were possibly also used for sensory functions, for combats between males, or for display such that the largest third pair with indication of high fitness level would have attracted females. The cercal blades of Megalograptus are believed to have been a considerable aid when swimming, acting like a biological rudder, but they were also able to articulate and move like a scissor. Given that there are no canals for poison in the telson of Megalograptus, it is possible that they were used almost akin to giant pincers, making the telson and the surrounding structures into a grasping organ, possibly used for defense and during mating.

Megalograptus is known from what were once near-shore marine environments. M. ohioensis occurred alongside a typical Late Ordovician fauna, including trilobites (Isotelus and Flexicalymene), bryozoans, gastropods, pelecypods, brachiopods, ostracods and scolecodonts. The late Ordovician fossils of M. ohioensis, as well as the associated fauna, were found in a rock layer containing remnants of volcanic ash, indicating that the ecosystem in which they lived was destroyed through a volcanic eruption. The fauna co-occurring with M. shideleri was similar, consisting of cephalopods, bryozoans, gastropods and scolecodonts. M. williamsae was recovered in a so-called "trilobite bed", alongside several different trilobite species. The fossils of M. welchi were recovered in a crinoid fossil site otherwise popular with fossil hunters. Other fossil fauna known from the fossil site of M. welchi include the trilobites Ceraurus and Dalmanites, the sponge Brachiospongia and various crinoids, such as Glyptocrinus and Dendrocrinus. M. alveolatus occurred with a typical Late Ordovician fauna, including brachiopods, such as Orthorhynchula, and bivalves, such as Byssonychia.

== See also ==
- List of eurypterid genera
- Timeline of eurypterid research
