= Waldron Shale =

Geologic formation in Indiana, Kentucky, and Mississippi

- Stratigraphic range: Homerian
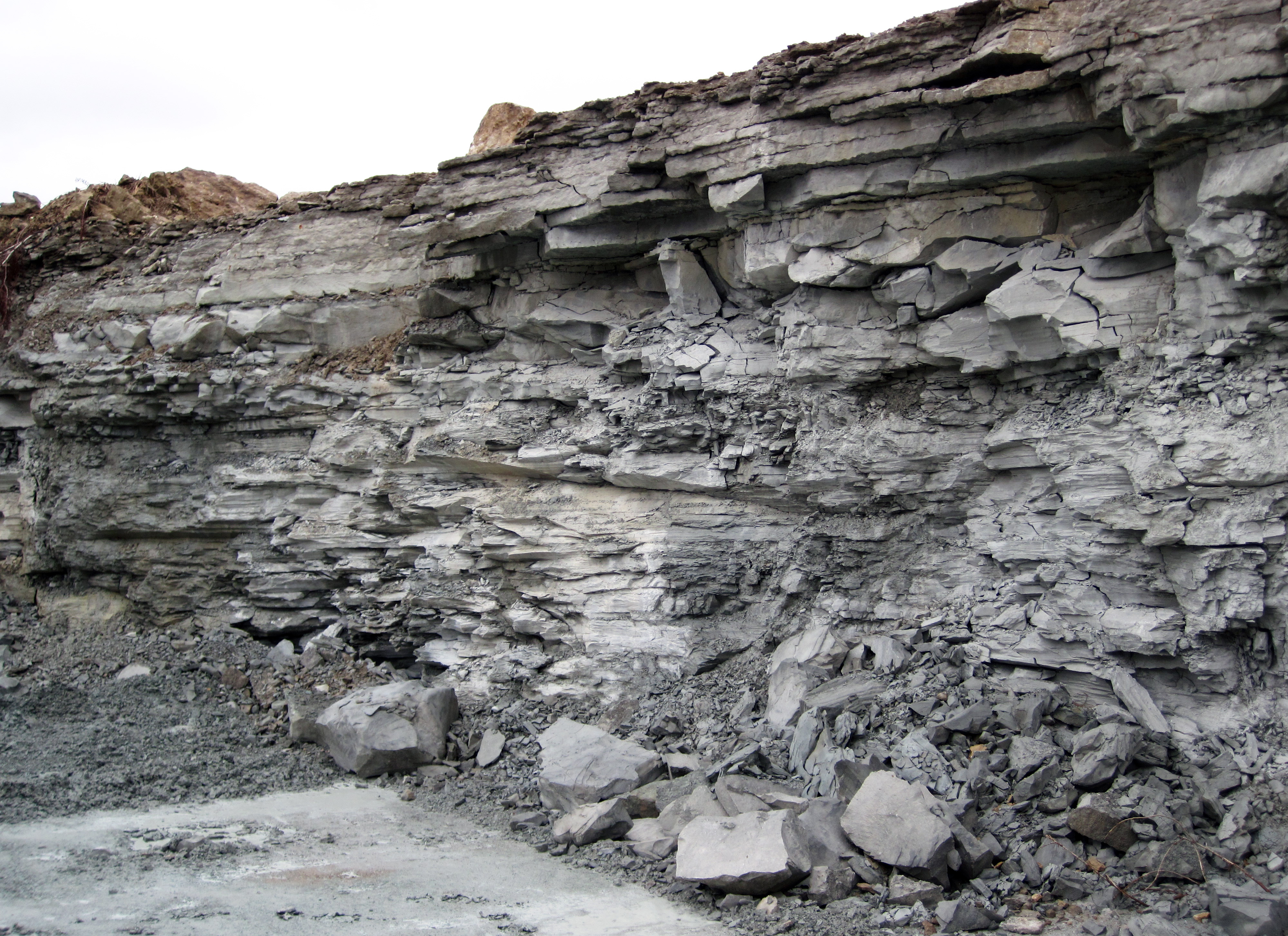
- Waldron Shale (St. Paul Stone Quarry, St. Paul, Indiana)
- Type: Formation
- Underlies: Lego Limestone and Louisville Limestone
- Overlies: Laurel Formation and Salamonie Dolomite

Location
- Country: United States
- Extent: Indiana, Kentucky, and Mississippi

The Waldron Shale is a geologic formation in Indiana. It preserves fossils dating back to the Silurian period. These fossils comprise at least three different benthic communities primarily living in the inter-reef, deep waters that were stable for much of the Wenlockian epoch. Many of these fossils are found most frequently around microbioherms constructed by small encrusting organisms which protected other species from the effects of storms.

This formation was named by Moses N. Elrod, M.D. in 1883. He wrote about in a report about the geology of Decatur County, Indiana.

"The Upper Niagara shale bed, is the calcareous clay, shale and thin strata of limestone overlying the quarry stone, and closing the Niagara period and group. The greater per cent of the mass is carbonate of lime. In Shelby county, they are known as the Waldron beds. In my report on Bartholomew county, I generally called this formation Calcareous shale, which is appropriate so far as chemical composition is concerned, but the presence of another calcareous shale at the base of the Niagara group in this county, not seen in Shelby and Bartholomew, necessitates the use of a more specific term. Following the rule of priority, Waldron being the place where the Upper Niagan bed fossils were first found and studied, I shall refer to it by the name of Waldron shale. In general it is made up of thin laminae of shale, frequently erroneously called slate, with bands of limestone near bottom; and where constantly wet, the shale is replaced by clay. Where exposed to atmospheric influences it weathers to a buff or ochrey-colored friable clay, scarcely distinguishable from the surrounding yellow clay; where protected, the color is uniformly a drab or blue, with occasional streaks of green. The Waldron shale is not uniformly found at all the places where both the Niagara and Corniferous groups outcrop. It was seen only on Clifty creek and Flat Rock, in the west and northwest parts of the county. In thickness, it ranges from ten inches to six feet. At certain places the upper shale is highly fossiliferous, as at St. Paul, and at Hartsville, less than one mile west of the Decatur county line; at some points no fossils could be found, and very few at others."

== See also ==
- List of fossiliferous stratigraphic units in Indiana
