= Dayton Formation =

Geologic formation in Ohio, United States

- Stratigraphic range: Silurian
- Type: Formation
- Underlies: Osgood Shale and Rochester Shale
- Overlies: Brassfield Formation and Cataract Group

Location
- Country: United States
- Extent: Ohio

The Dayton Formation is a geologic formation in Ohio. It dates back to the Silurian.
