= Springfield Dolomite =

Geologic formation in Ohio, United States

- Stratigraphic range: Silurian
- Type: Formation
- Underlies: Cedarville Dolomite
- Overlies: Euphemia Dolomite

Location
- Country: United States
- Extent: Ohio

The Springfield Dolomite is a geologic formation in Ohio. It dates back to the Silurian.
