= Salamonie Dolomite =

Geologic formation in Indiana, United States

- Stratigraphic range: Silurian
- Type: Formation
- Underlies: Pleasant Mills Formation and Waldron Shale
- Overlies: Brassfield Limestone, Cataract Formation, and Sexton Creek Limestone

Location
- Region: Indiana
- Country: United States

The Salamonie Dolomite is a geologic formation in Indiana. It preserves fossils dating back to the Silurian period.

== See also ==
- List of fossiliferous stratigraphic units in Indiana
