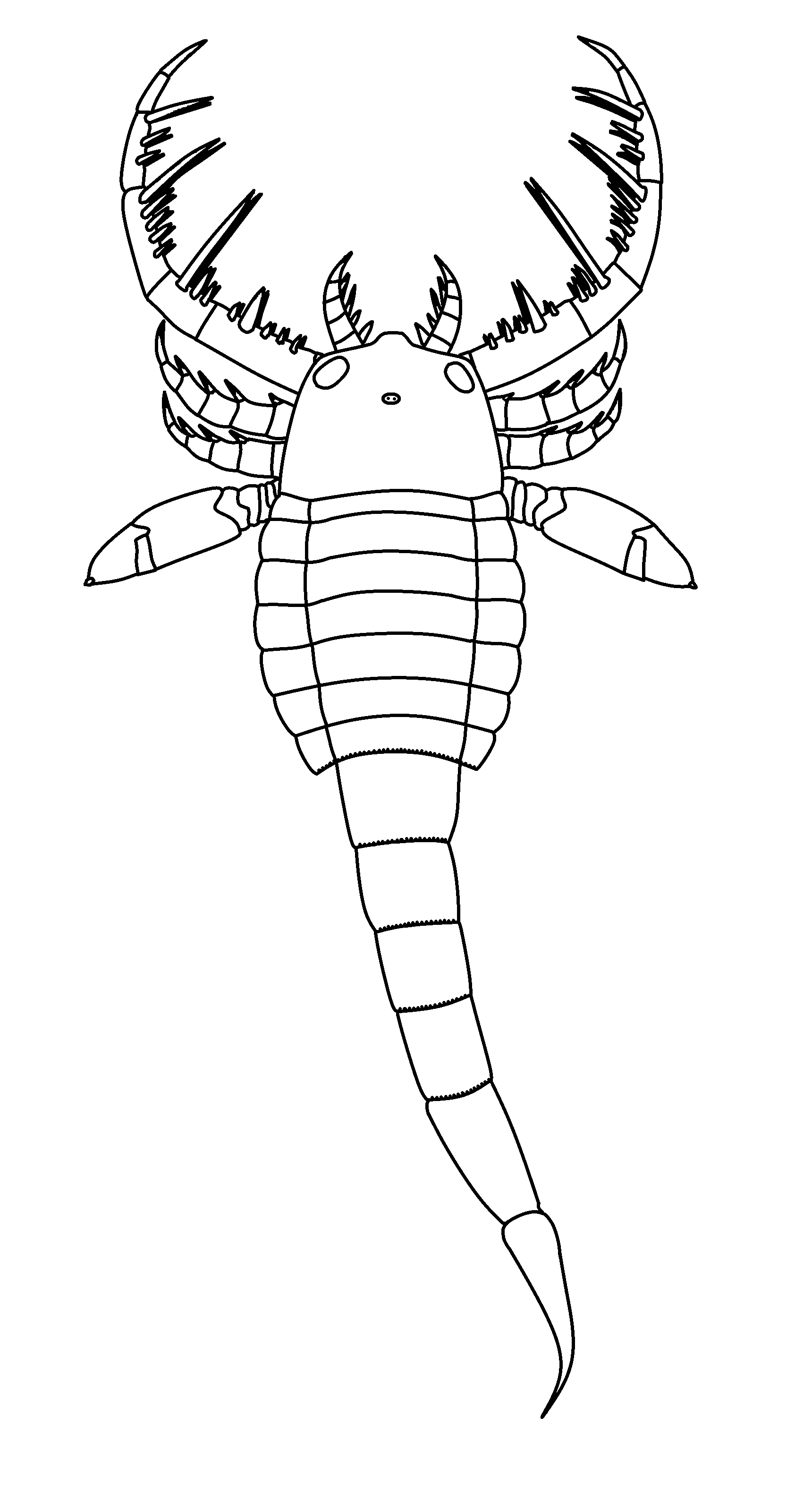
- Lanarkopterus

Scientific classification
- Kingdom: Animalia
- Phylum: Arthropoda
- Subphylum: Chelicerata
- Order: †Eurypterida
- Infraorder: †Diploperculata
- Superfamily: †Carcinosomatoidea
- Family: †Lanarkopteridae; Tollerton, 1989

Genera
- †Lanarkopterus; †Terropterus

= Lanarkopteridae =

Lanarkopteridae Temporal range: Katian–Ludlow

Extinct superfamily of sea scorpions

Lanarkopteridae is an extinct family of eurypterids. The family contains two genera: Lanarkopterus and Terropterus.

Under previous classification schemes, the lanarkopterids were sometimes classified as part of the family Mixopteridae.
