= Xiushan Formation =

Geologic formation in China

- Stratigraphic range: Llandovery
- Type: Geological formation

Location
- Region: Southern China
- Country: China

Type section
- Named for: Xiushan County

The Xiushan Formation is a palaeontological formation located in China. It dates to the Lower Silurian period. Studies of conodonts found in the formation suggests the lower member and main part of the upper member correspond to the Pterospathodus eopennatus Superbiozone, whereas the top of the upper member likely correlates with the Pterospathodus celloni Superbiozone.

== Fossil content ==
=== Cartilaginous fish ===
Cartilaginous fish reported from the Xiushan Formation
Genus	Species	Presence	Material	Notes	Images
Chenolepis	C. asketa	Guizhou.	Scales.	Also known from the Ymogantau Formation.	

=== Jawless fish ===
Jawless fish reported from the Xiushan Formation
Genus	Species	Presence	Material	Notes	Images
Dayongaspis	D. colubra	Maoyanhe Town, Zhangjiajie, Hunan.		A galeaspid.	

=== Invertebrates ===
==== Eurypterids ====
Eurypterids reported from the Xiushan Formation
Genus	Species	Presence	Material	Notes	Images
Terropterus	T. xiushanensis	Xiushan.	Several specimens.	A mixopterid.	

== See also ==
- List of fossil sites
