= Cedarville Dolomite =

Geological formation in Ohio

- Stratigraphic range: Silurian
- Type: Formation
- Underlies: Greenfield Dolomite
- Overlies: Springfield Dolomite

Location
- Country: United States
- Extent: Ohio

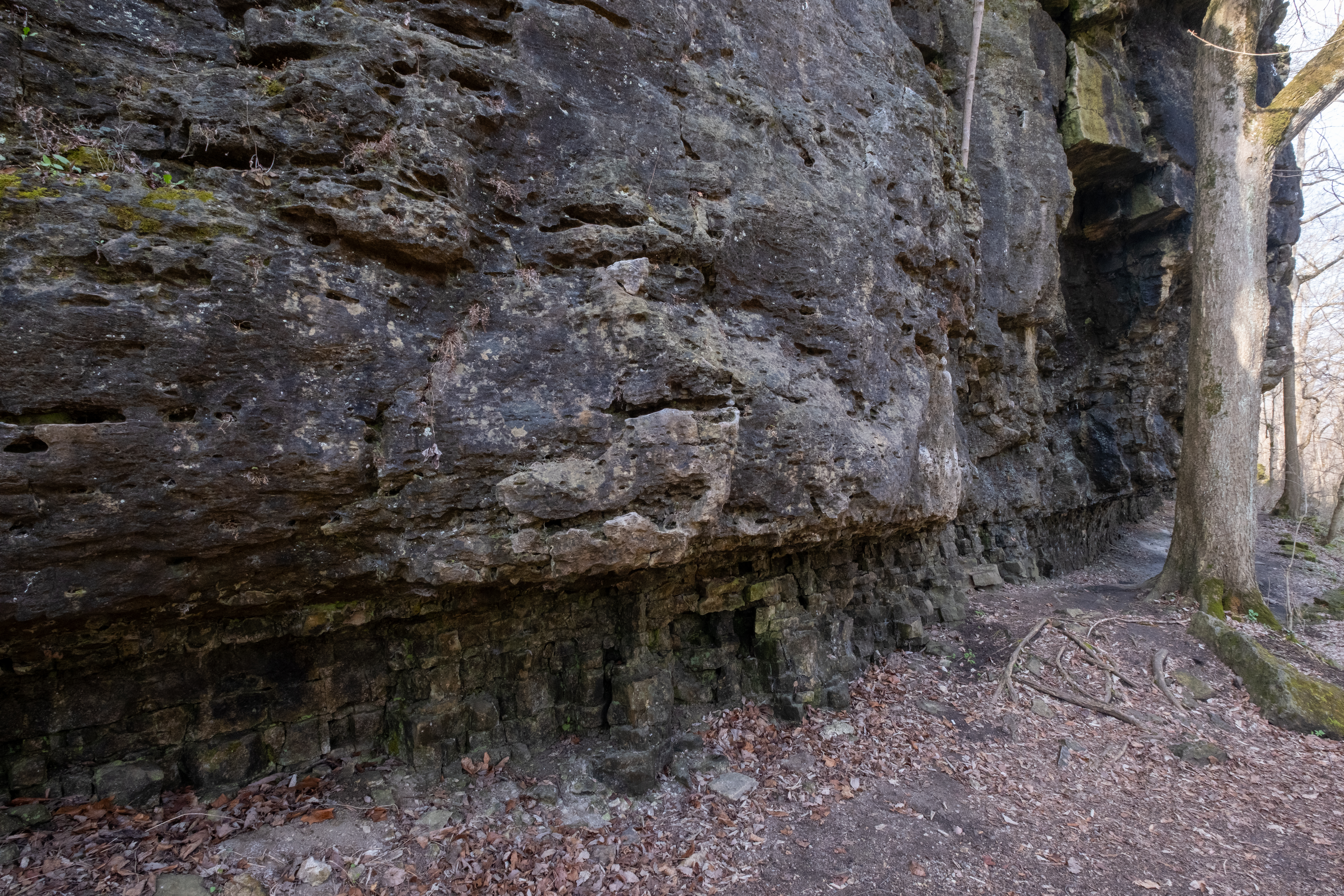
An exposure showing the contact between the Cedarville Dolomite and Springfield Dolomite at Mad River Gorge & Nature Preserve in Clark County, Ohio

The Cedarville Dolomite is a geologic formation in Ohio. It dates back to the Silurian.
