= Osgood Formation =

Geologic formation in Indiana, Kentucky and Ohio

- Stratigraphic range: Sheinwoodian
- Type: Formation
- Underlies: Laurel Limestone
- Overlies: Brassfield Formation and Dayton Formation

Location
- Country: United States
- Extent: Indiana, Kentucky, Mississippi, and Ohio

The Osgood Formation, also known as the Osgood Shale, is a geologic formation in Indiana, Kentucky, and Ohio. It preserves fossils dating back to the Silurian period.

== See also ==
- List of fossiliferous stratigraphic units in Indiana
- List of fossiliferous stratigraphic units in Kentucky
- List of fossiliferous stratigraphic units in Ohio
