= Euphemia Dolomite =

Geologic formation in Ohio

- Stratigraphic range: Silurian
- Type: Formation
- Underlies: Springfield Dolomite
- Overlies: Massie Shale

Location
- Country: United States
- Extent: Ohio

The Euphemia Dolomite is a geologic formation in Ohio. It dates back to the Silurian.
