= Brassfield Formation =

Geologic formation in the United States

- Stratigraphic range: Rhuddanian - TelychianEarly Silurian
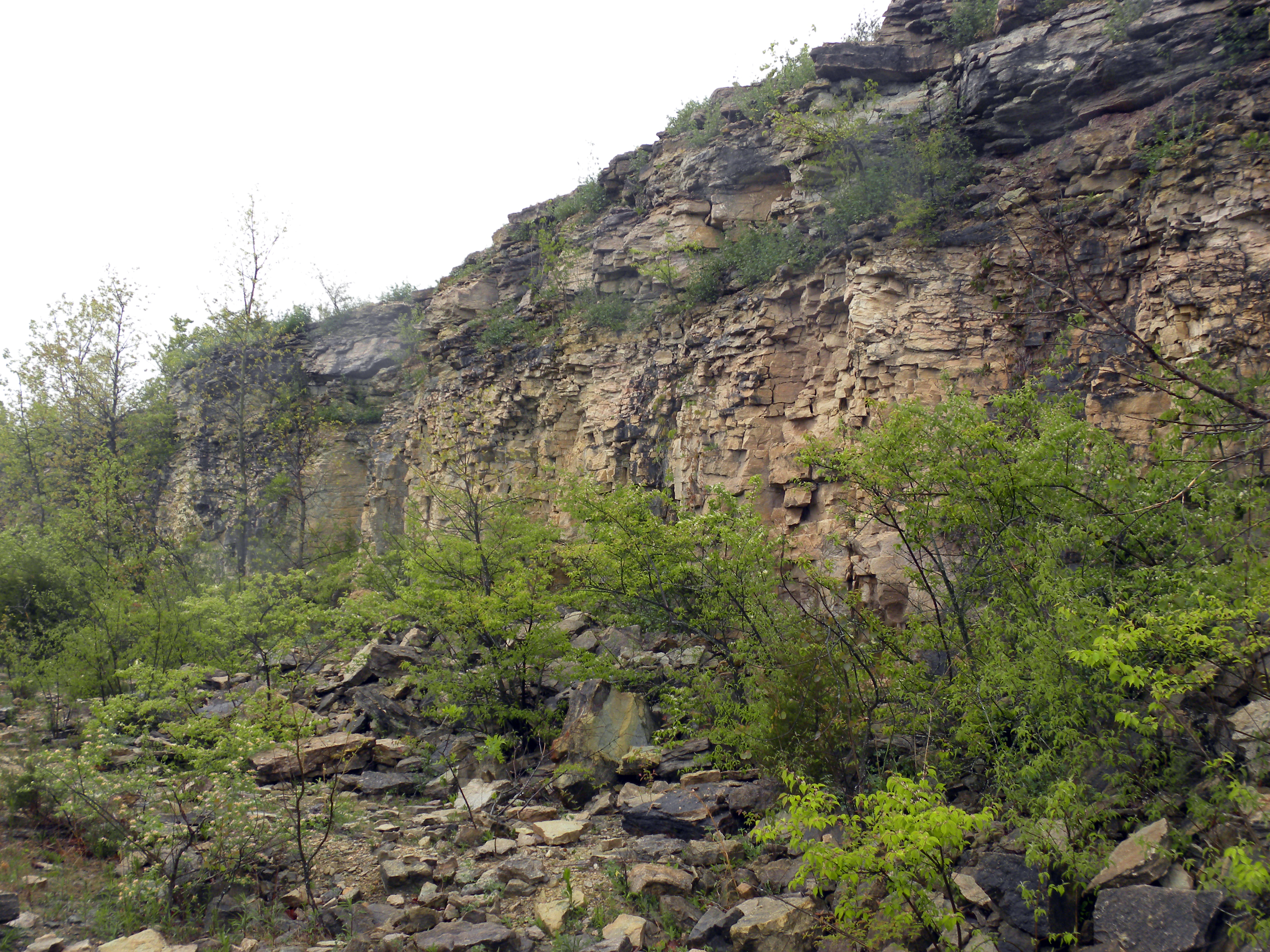
- Brassfield Formation exposed in Oakes Quarry near Fairborn, Ohio.
- Type: Sedimentary
- Underlies: Crab Orchard Formation, Dayton Formation, Osgood Formation, Salamonie Dolomite, and St. Clair Limestone
- Overlies: Brainard Shale, Cason Shale, Drakes Formation, and Whitewater Formation

Lithology
- Primary: Limestone
- Other: dolomite

Location
- Region: East-central USA
- Country: United States
- Extent: Arkansas, Indiana, Kentucky, Ohio, and Tennessee

Type section
- Named for: Brassfield, Kentucky
- Named by: August Frederick Foerste (1906, p. 18, 27)

The Brassfield Formation, named by A.F. Foerste in 1906, is a limestone and dolomite formation exposed in Arkansas, Ohio, Kentucky, Indiana, Tennessee and West Virginia in the United States. It is Early Silurian (Aeronian, Llandoverian) in age and well known for its abundant echinoderms, corals and stromatoporoids. In Ohio, where the unit has escaped dolomitization, the Brassfield is an encrinite biosparite with numerous crinoid species.

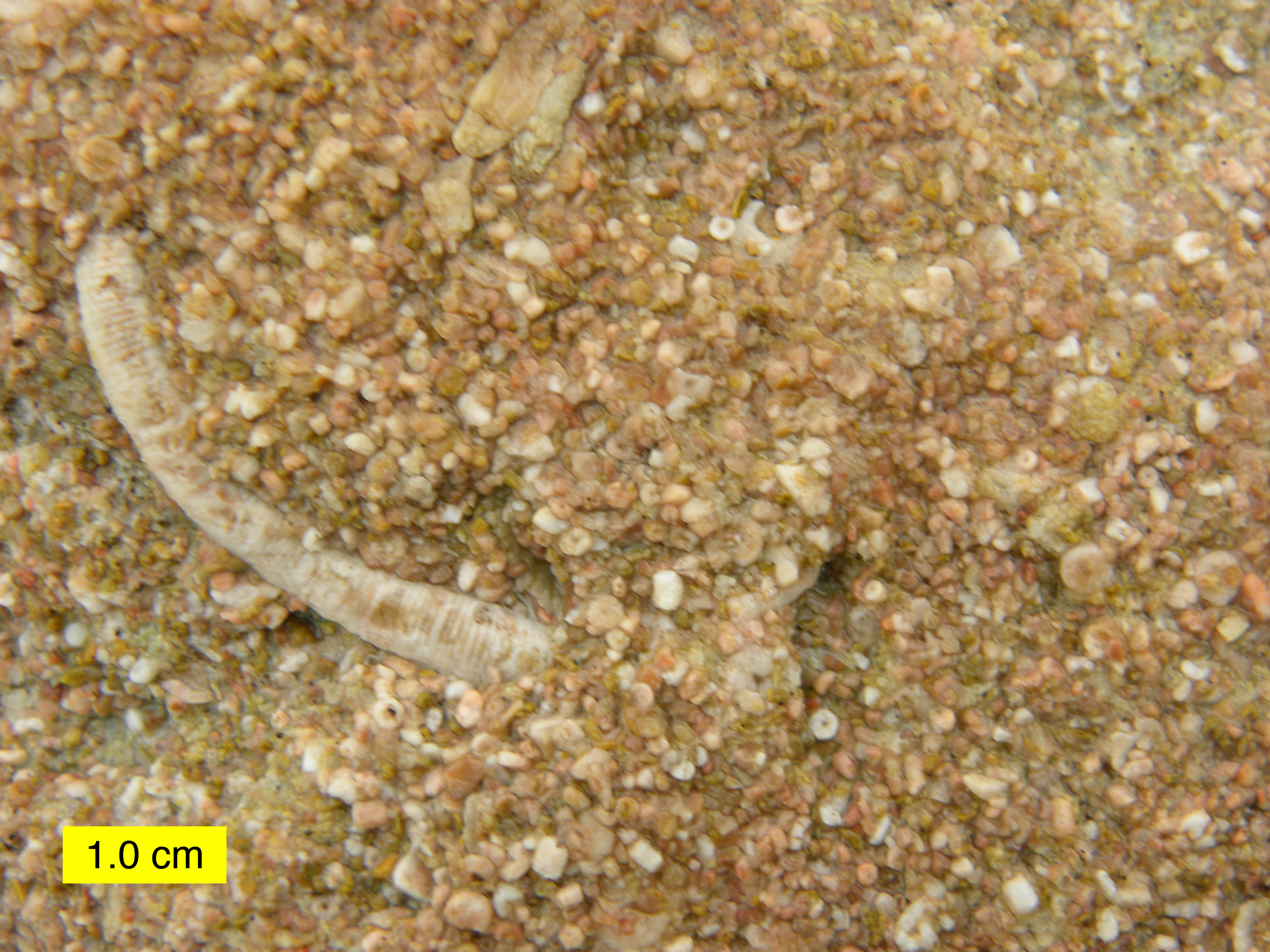
Close view of Brassfield Formation near Fairborn, Ohio, showing grains mainly composed of crinoid fragments.

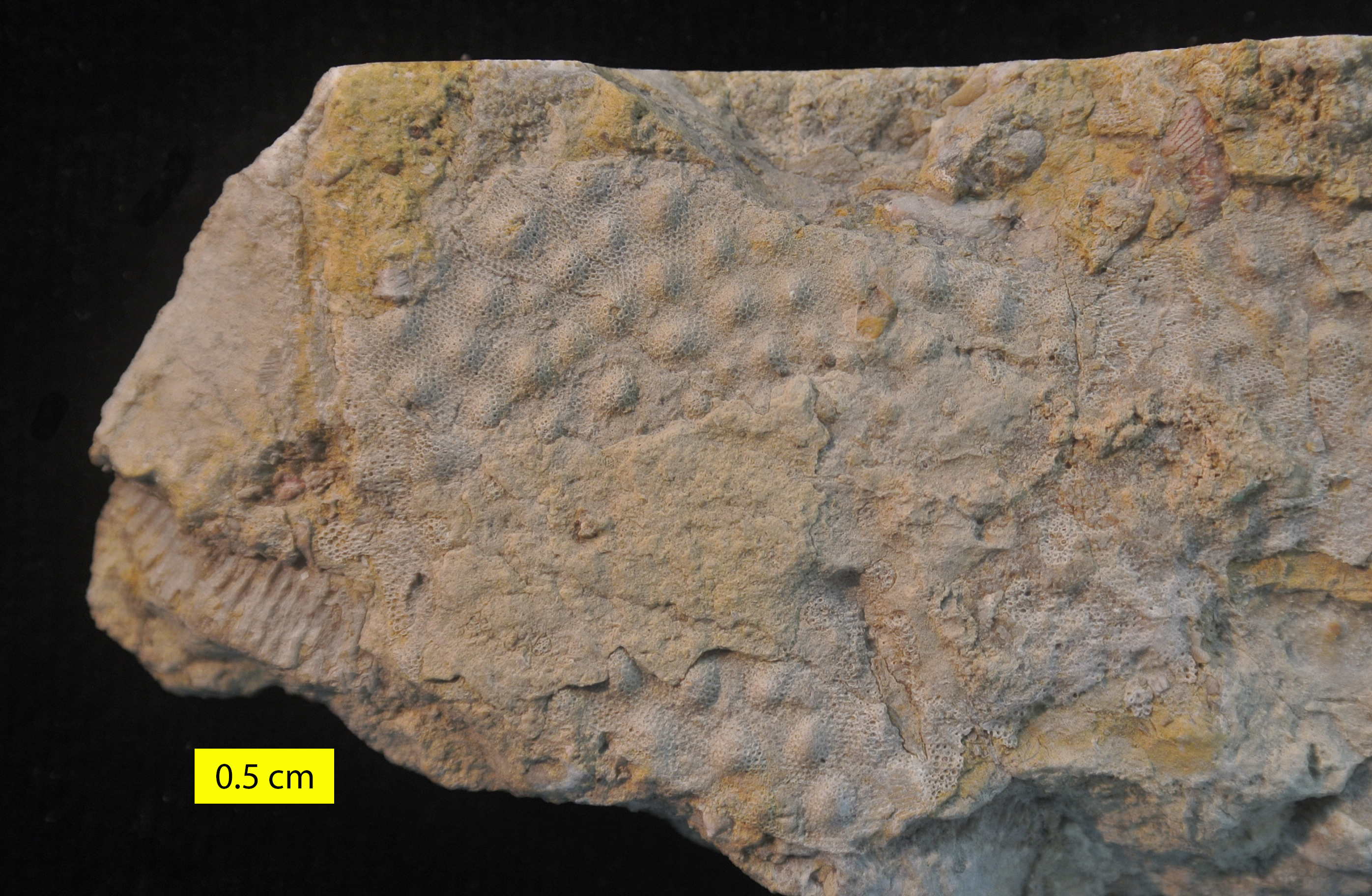
Phaenopora superba, a bryozoan from the Brassfield Formation.

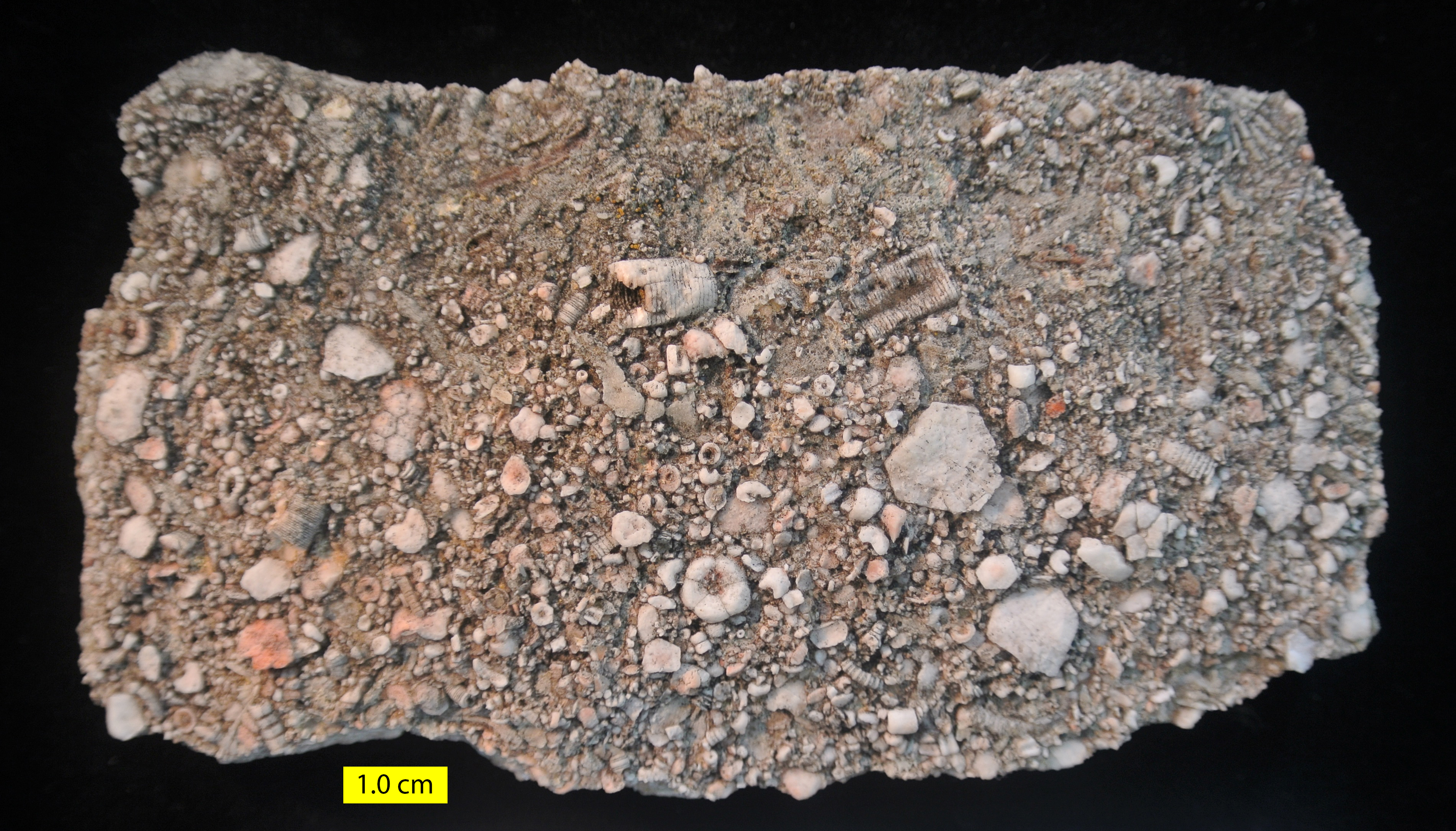
Encrinite from the Brassfield Formation (Silurian) near Fairborn, Ohio.
