= Encrinite =

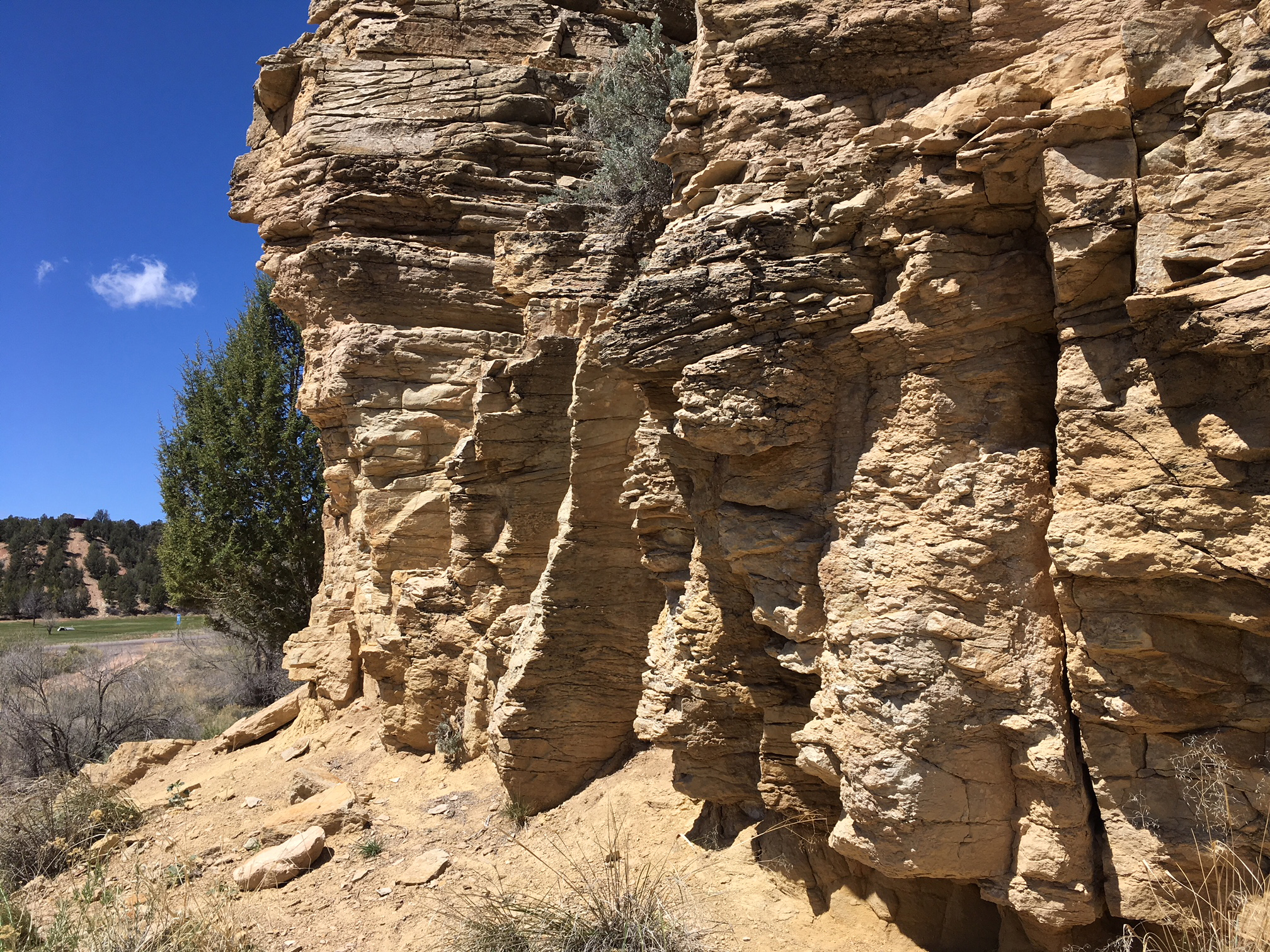
Encrinite within the Carmel Formation (Middle Jurassic) exposed at Mt. Carmel Junction, Utah. This is one of the youngest encrinites.

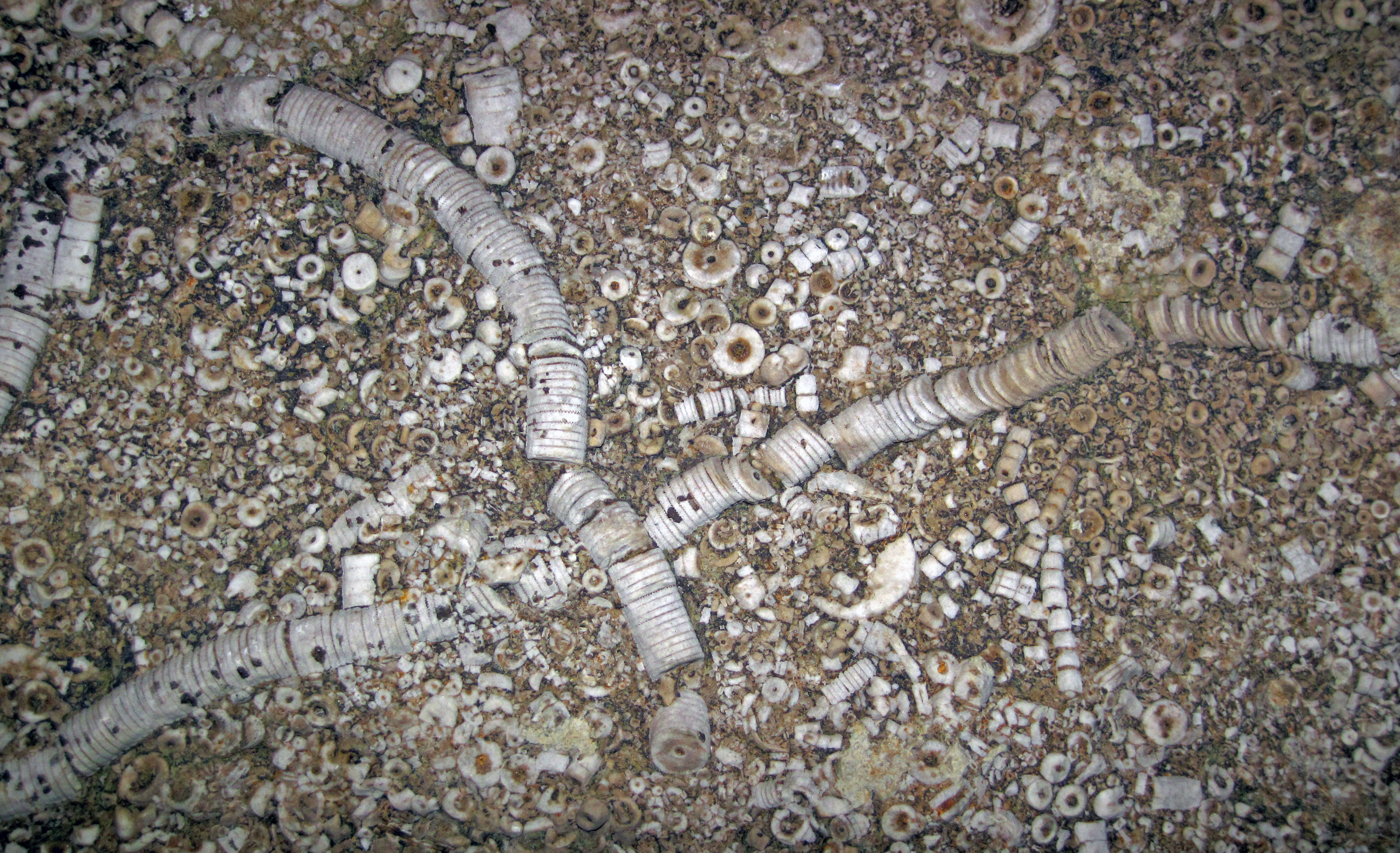
Encrinite (crinoidal limestone) from the Mississippian Ft. Payne Formation of southern Kentucky

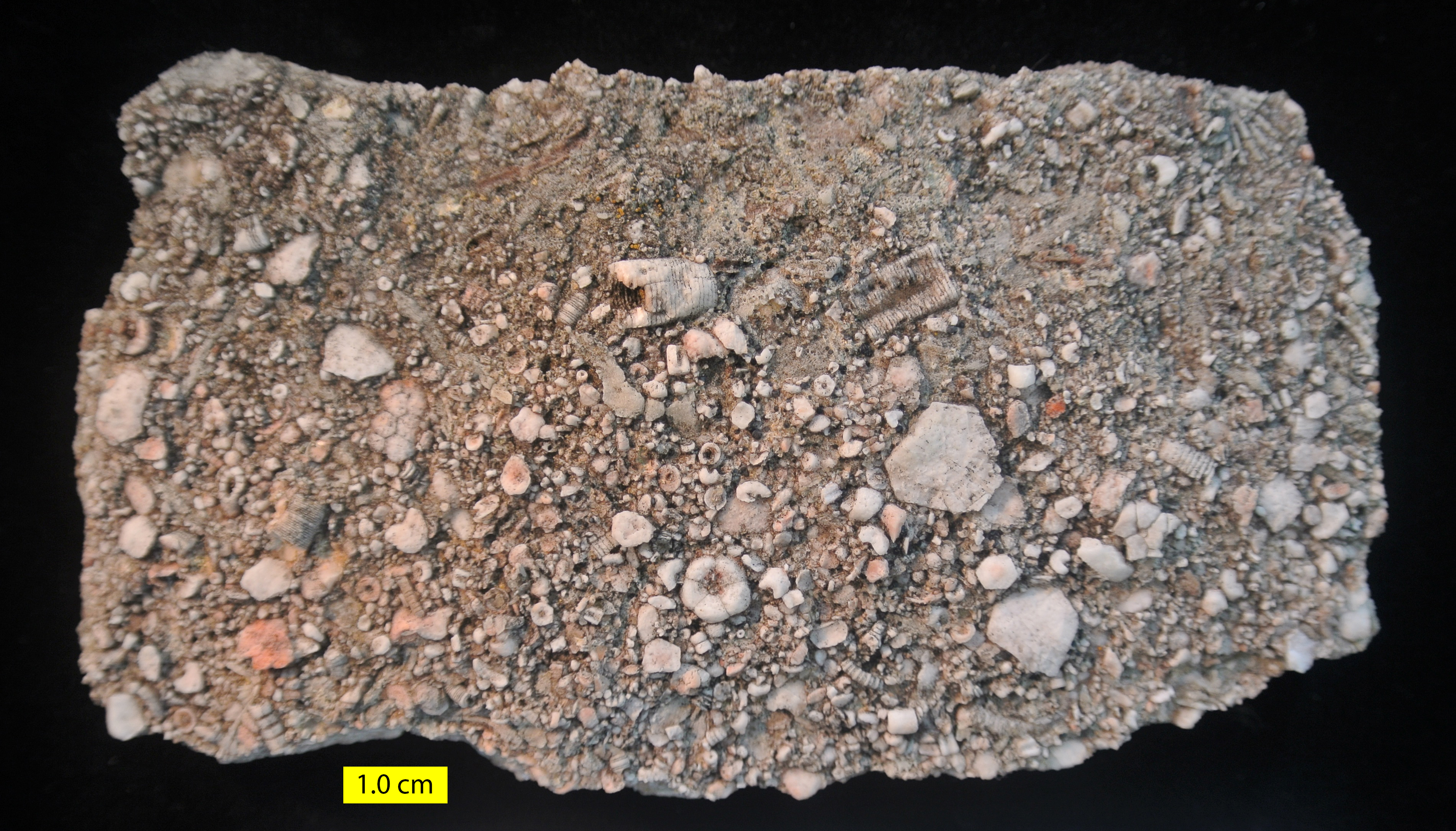
Example encrinite from the Silurian Brassfield Formation of Ohio. Note different sizes of ossicles present.

In its modern usage, which was established by Bissell and Chilingar, an encrinite is a crinoidal limestone containing crinoid ossicles in excess of 50 percent of the bulk of the rock. In terms of Dunham's classification of carbonate sedimentary rocks, it could be either a crinoidal packstone or crinoidal grainstone. In terms of Folk's classification of carbonate sedimentary rocks, an encrinite would be either a crinoidal biomicrite, crinoidal biosparite, crinoidal biomicrudite, or crinoidal biosparudite. In older literature, the word is sometimes used to refer to a crinoid, especially a fossil crinoid belonging to or like one belonging to the genus Encrinus. However, this usage is obsolete.

Ausich regards the term encrinite as being of very limited usefulness in modern sedimentology. Although it certainly describes a specific type of sedimentary rock, it ignores specific characteristics of crinoid-rich limestones, e.g. whether it has a mud matrix or spar cement, that are essential to recognizing their facies and origins. As a result, the term encrinite lacks usefulness in the current classification and nomenclature of sedimentary rocks and is, at best, a relict of the early nomenclatural history of sedimentology.

== Types of encrinites ==
Depending on their areal extent and thickness, the accumulation of encrinites can be subdivided into either "regional encrinites" or "local encrinites". A regional encrinite is an extensive accumulation of limestone that is at least 50% pelmatozoan ossicles at least 5 to 10 m (16 to 33 ft) thick and has an areal extent of at least 500 km^{2} (190 sq mi). By definition, crinoid ossicles are the predominate component of encrinites. However, the ossicles of other pelmatozoans, e.g., rhombiferans or diploporans during the Ordovician and Silurian or blastoids during the Lower Mississippian, can locally be the predominate bioclast. The classic example of an encrinite is the Burlington and Keokuk limestones of Iowa, Missouri, and Illinois. Additional examples of geologic formations that contain regional encrinites are the Lower Muschelkalk, Switzerland (Triassic); Redwall Limestone, Arizona (Mississippian); Coeymans, Keyser, and New Creek limestones, Pennsylvania (Devonian); Edgecliff Limestone, New York (Devonian); Brassfield Formation, Ohio (Silurian); and Chicotte Formation, Anticosti Island, Quebec (Silurian). Regional encrinites are only found in the stratigraphic record from the Ordovician through the Jurassic. They are most abundant in Lower Mississippian strata. Encrinites which do not meet the criteria of regional encrinites are termed local encrinites. They typically occur as individual lenses or beds 2 to 5 m (6.6 to 16.4 ft) thick of very limited lateral extent.

Regional encrinites accumulated where the offshore continental shelf was nearly completely dominated by crinoids (and in some cases other stalked echinoderms) for extensive periods of time. At the time of the accumulation of encrinites, the seafloor of the shallow continental sea consisted entirely of a coarse, poorly sorted pelmatozoans bioclasts lying within the storm-wave base. Because of the low-density and coarse nature of these bioclasts, the sea floor was episodically mobile during periodic storms. This made the sea floor an unfavorable habitat for most non-pelmatozoan benthic organisms. However, this type of seafloor was it was well suited for pelmatozoans to anchor their rhizoid holdfasts. This created a positive taphonomic feedback in which the disarticulation of pelmatozoans provided abundant bioclastic debris that created a seafloor that encouraged the establishment and growth of pelmatozoans, but discouraged the establishment and growth of other benthic organisms.

== Distribution ==
Encrinites form in areas where disaggregated crinoid skeletal debris becomes concentrated, typically shallow warm euhaline seas. They are therefore very common in the Paleozoic rock record of North America and Eurasia, particularly during the Silurian through Early Devonian and the Early Mississippian age, when high sea levels created widespread epeiric seas. Some encrinites are also known from the Jurassic of North America and Western Europe.

== See also ==
Fossil hash
