= Laurel Formation (Silurian) =

Geological formation in Indiana and Kentucky

Laurel Limestone
- Stratigraphic range: Sheinwoodian - Homerian
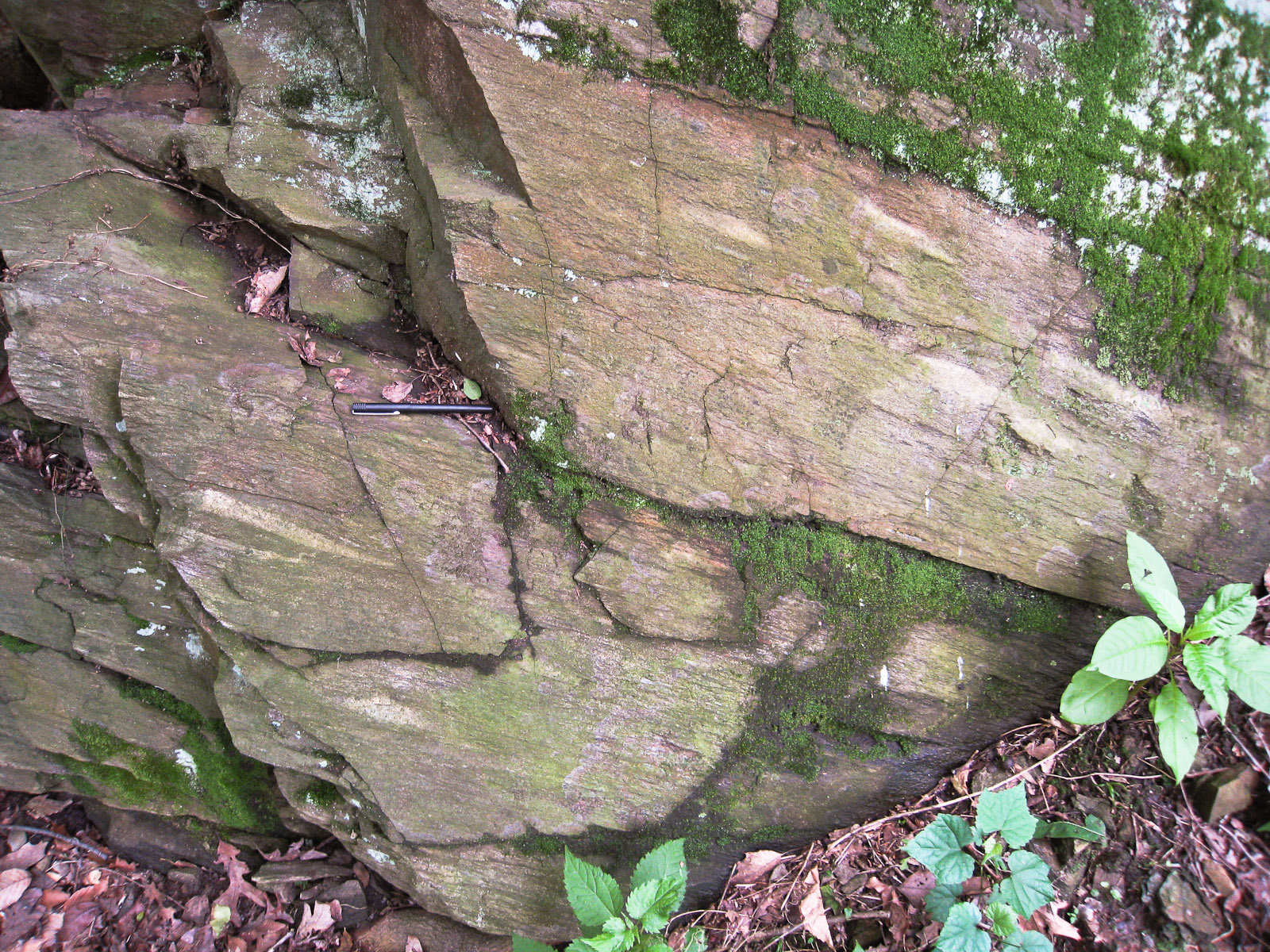
- Laurel Formation
- Type: Formation
- Underlies: Massie Shale and Waldron Shale
- Overlies: Osgood Shale

Location
- Country: United States
- Extent: Indiana, Kentucky, Mississippi, and Ohio

The Laurel Formation, also known as the Laurel Limestone or the Laurel Dolomite, is a geologic formation in Indiana and Kentucky. It preserves fossils dating back to the Silurian period.

== See also ==
- List of fossiliferous stratigraphic units in Indiana
