= Massie Shale =

Geologic formation in Ohio, United States

- Stratigraphic range: Silurian
- Type: Formation
- Underlies: Euphemia Dolomite
- Overlies: Laurel Limestone

Location
- Country: United States
- Extent: Ohio

The Massie Shale is a geologic formation in Ohio. It dates back to the Silurian.
