= August Foerste =

American geologist and paleontologist (1862–1936)

August F. Foerste
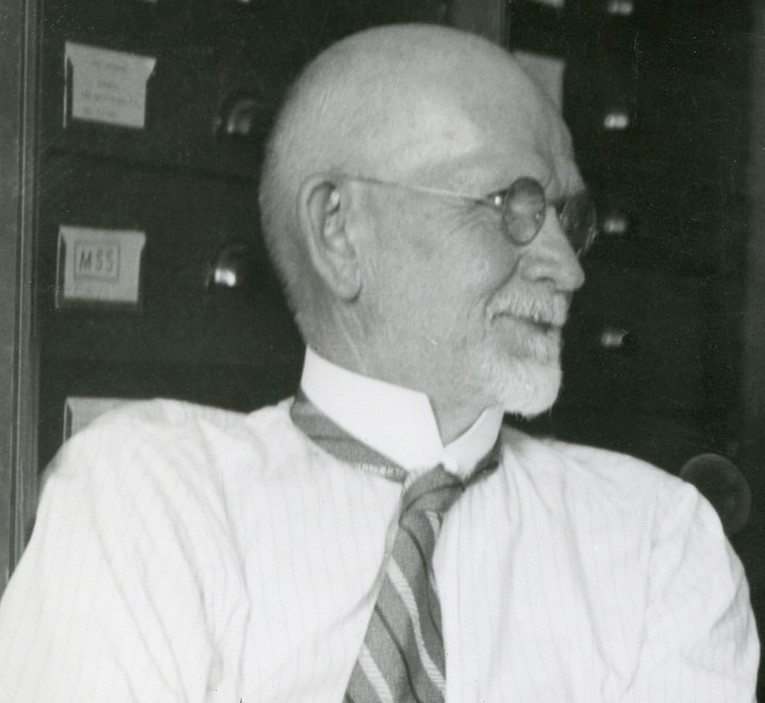
- Born: May 7, 1862; Dayton, Ohio, U.S.
- Died: April 23, 1936 (aged 73)
- Resting place: Woodland Cemetery Dayton Ohio
- Education: Denison University; Harvard University; Heidelberg University; College de France
- Scientific career
- Fields: Geology; Paleontology
- Workplaces: United States National Museum

August F. Foerste (1862–1936) was an American geologist, science teacher, and paleontologist from Ohio.

== Biography ==
Foerste was born on May 7, 1862, in Dayton, Ohio. In his early high school years, he explored his initial passion for botany and collected more than 1,000 specimens from the Dayton area. Once introduced to fossils, however, in a presentation by Edward Orton Sr., he shifted his focus to paleontology.

He studied geology at Denison University, from which he received a bachelor's degree in 1887. Later, he got master's degree at Harvard University in 1888, and PhD in 1890. He served as an assistant for the United States Geological Survey, in Harvard, in which he studied stratigraphy and petrography of New England. After his graduation from Harvard, he studied at the Heidelberg University and College de France for two years.

His investigations led to him naming the Brassfield Formation which he distinguished from the Clinton Formation. His investigations and studies focused on the paleontology and stratigraphy of the Silurian period (there are fossils from this era named after him), Ordovician fossils (of Canada and the United States), and Paleozoic cephalopods (of Ozarkian-Canadian system with Edward Oscar Ulrich).

He returned to Dayton in 1893 and became a science and physics teacher at Robert W Steele High School, a position which he kept till his retirement in 1932. He was also one of the founding members of the Dayton Astronomical Society, which was incorporated in 1909.

In 1896, 1897, and 1899 he spent his summer vacations in Indiana, while conducting geological surveys. In 1908 and 1919 he spent his summers in Ohio, doing his geological surveys there as well. From 1904 to 1912 he was in Kentucky conducting a geological survey; doing the same while in Canada from 1911 to 1912.

Some of his research in wooden boxes was swept away from his office during the 1913 Flood in Dayton. The boxes were found and returned, but some maps and drawings, representing 20 years of research, were lost. Foerste used his knowledge of the Dayton area's geology to advise the Miami Conservancy District as they were planning to install a dam system in response to the flood.

He began researching invertebrate paleontology at the United States National Museum in 1920, where he was appointed an Associate in Paleontology in 1932. In 1928, he served as president of the American Paleontological Society.

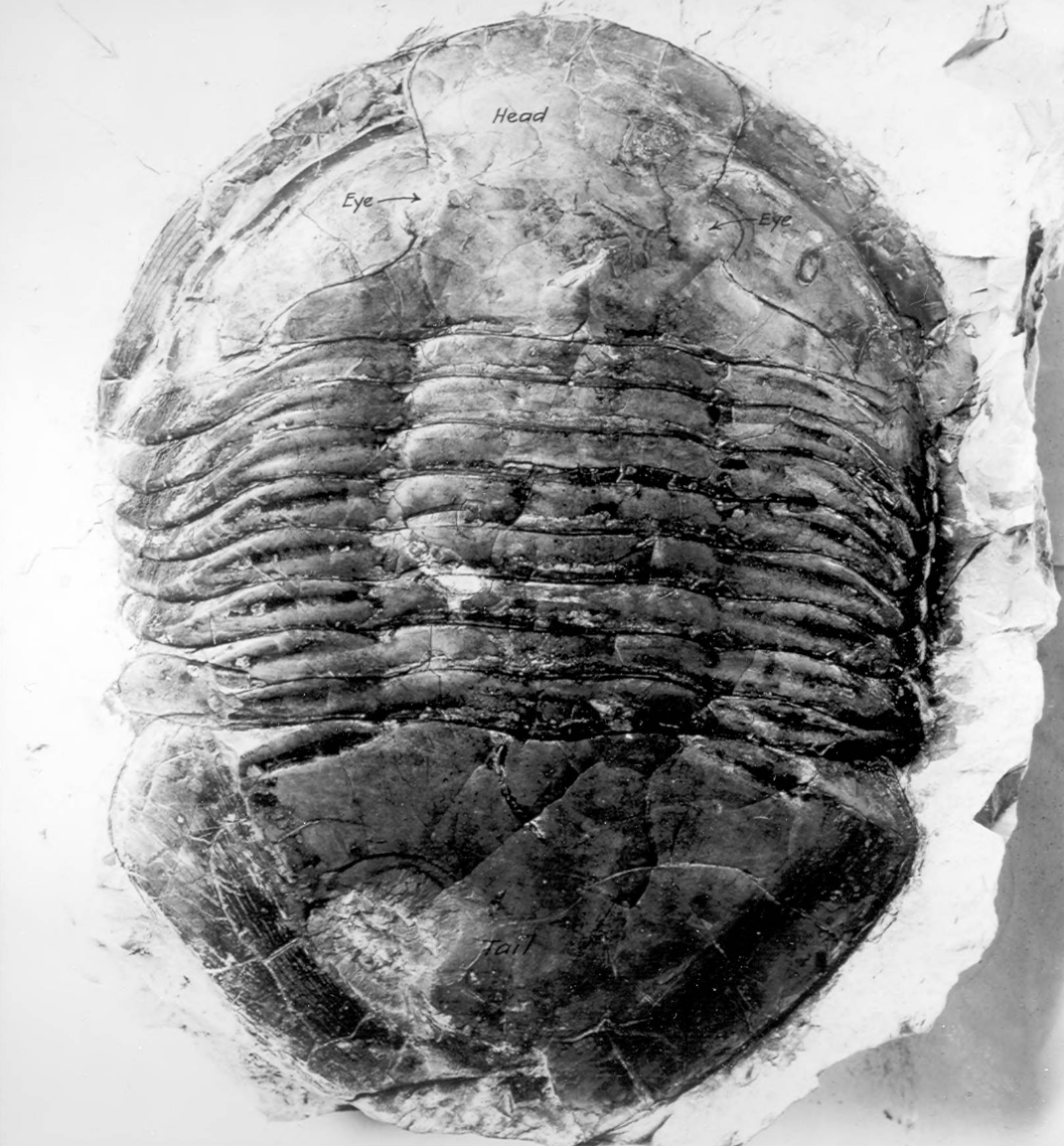
1919 photograph of the Huffman Dam specimen of Isotelus maximus ("Isotelus brachycephalus"), for many years considered the largest complete trilobite in the world.

When the largest and most complete Isotelus trilobite fossil was found by construction workers building the Huffman Dam, Foerste's involvement with the National Museum of Natural History led to the fossil being donated to what is today the Smithsonian Institution. Foerste was also a member of an amateur paleontology group called the "Cincinnati School." Affiliated with the Cincinnati Society of Natural History, the turn of the century group's collections and research boosted the museum's notability.

He died on April 23, 1936, and is buried at Woodland Cemetery.

== Publications ==
- Papers on botany, paleontology, etc. clipped from periodicals (1881-8)
- "Silurian fossils from the Kokomo, West Union, and Alger horizons of Indiana, Ohio, and Kentucky" (1909)
- "Geology of Dayton and Vicinity" (1915)
