= Fossil hash =

Groups of fossils in the same rock

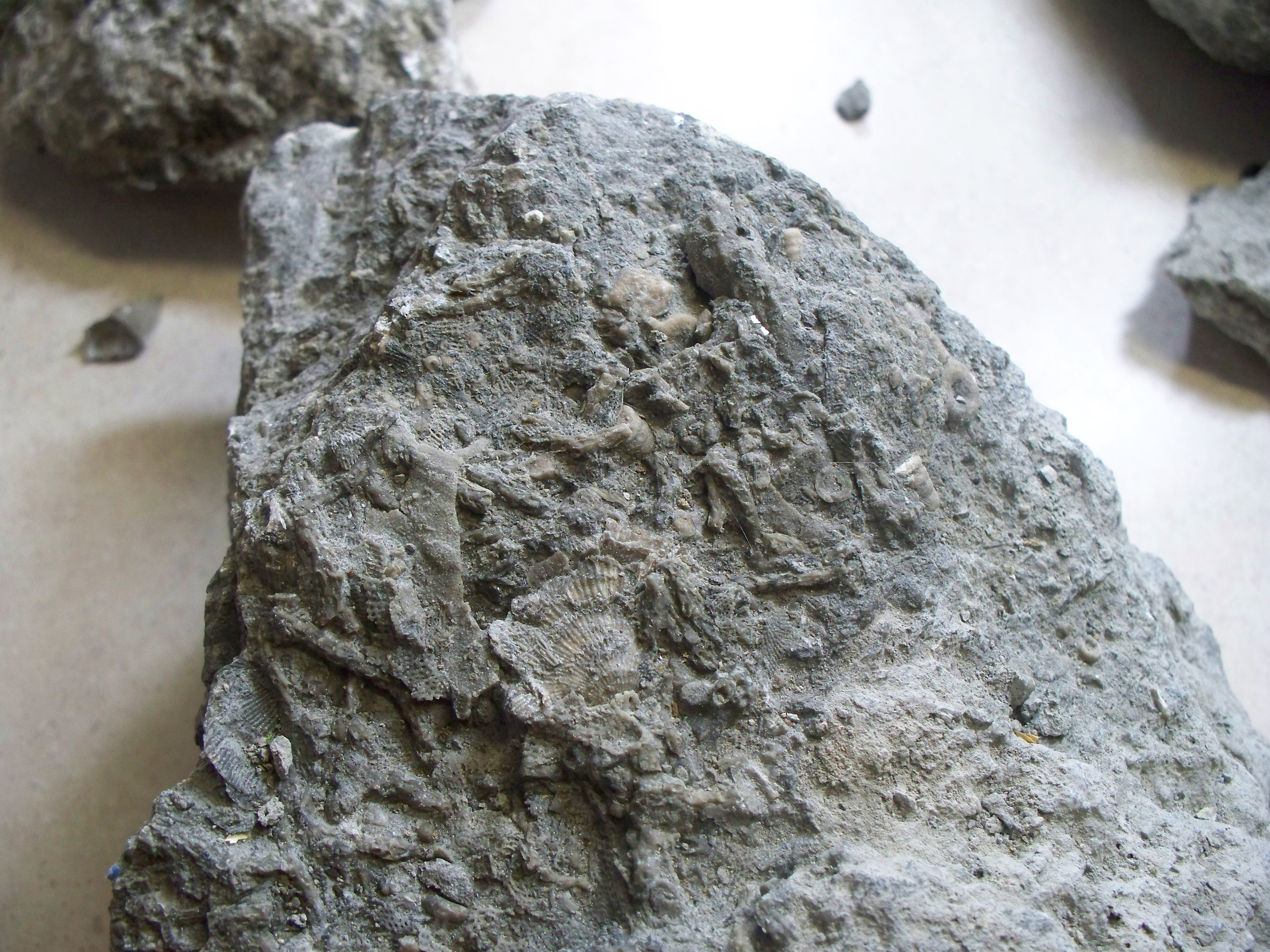
A fossil hash

A fossil hash is either a sediment or sedimentary rock composed predominately of fragmented fossils of either shells, tergites, bones, teeth, other hard parts, or some combination of these remains. The fossil hard parts of various animals, including brachiopods, corals, crinoids, bryozoans, ostracods, pelecypods, and trilobites, occur in shell hashes. If the fossil hash consists almost exclusively of one type of fossil, it is often named after that fossil, as in the case of crinoidal hash, trilobites hash, and oyster-shell hash. Depending on the amount of matrix mud, fossil hashes have been classified as either packstones, grainstones, or more rarely as wackestones, of The Dunham classification system for carbonate sedimentary rocks.

Fossil hashes are associated with a variety of depositional environments. They can be found where either currents or waves erode, fragment, and concentrate the hard body parts of animals after they have died. For example, they have been found as a part of storm deposits (tempestites), tsunami deposits (tsunamites), and tidal deposits. Fossil hashes also occur as erosional lag deposits associated with hiatal and ravinement surfaces.

== See also ==
Encrinite
