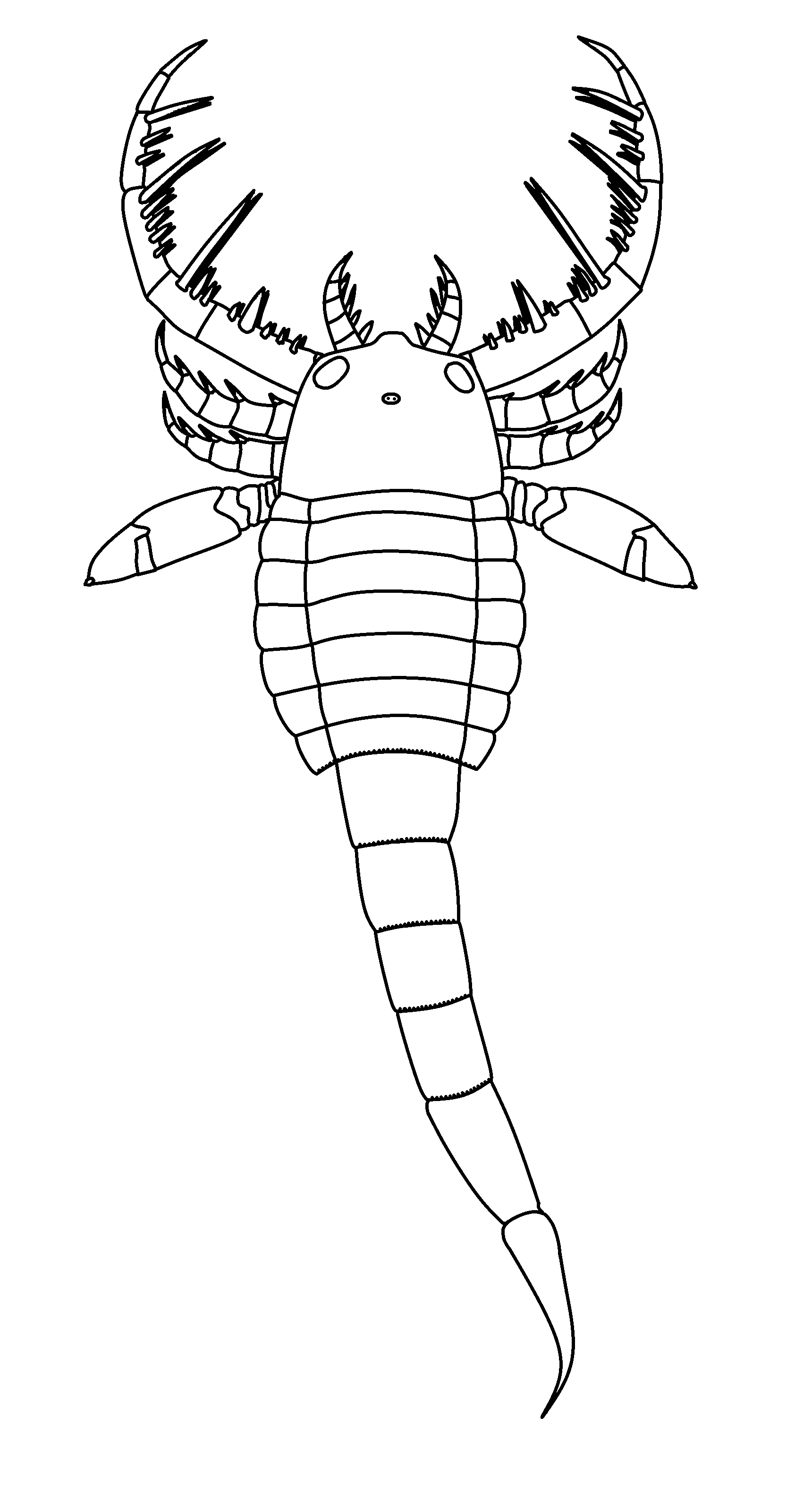
- Restoration of L. dolichoschelus.

Scientific classification
- Kingdom: Animalia
- Phylum: Arthropoda
- Subphylum: Chelicerata
- Order: †Eurypterida
- Superfamily: †Carcinosomatoidea
- Family: †Lanarkopteridae
- Genus: †Lanarkopterus; Ritchie, 1968

Type species
- Lanarkopterus dolichoschelus Peach and Horne, 1899

Synonyms
- Eurypterus dolichoschelus (Peach and Horne, 1899); Mixopterus dolichoschelus (Størmer, 1936)

= Lanarkopterus =

Lanarkopterus Temporal range: Late Silurian, Ludlow epoch, 422.9–418.7 Ma

Extinct genus of arthropods

Lanarkopterus is a genus of prehistoric eurypterid with one recognised species, Lanarkopterus dolichoschelus. Lanarkopterus was long seen as a species of the related Mixopterus, though more complete specimens discovered in the 1960s determined that it differed in several aspects, enough to warrant a separate genus.

Specimens of the genus have been recovered from deposits of Late Silurian age in Scotland.

== Description ==
Size comparison of L. dolichoschelus

Lanarkopterus was a small to moderately large (ranging in size from less than 10 centimeters to over 30 centimeters) eurypterid. Similar to Mixopterus, Lanarkopterus appeared almost scorpion-like with a broad and trilobed preabdomen, a narrow and tapering postabdomen and a sharped and curved telsonic spine.

== History of discovery ==
Specimens of Lanarkopterus were first noted by Peach and Horne (1899) in the Ludlowian fish beds of the Lesmahagow and Hagshaw Hills Silurian inliers in Ayrshire and Lanarkshire, Scotland. Fragments of the genus, then referred to Eurypterus, were recovered from many localities that also yielded Silurian vertebrates such as Birkenia, Lasanius, Thelodus, Lanarkia and Atleleaspis.

Størmer (1936) described several specimens of Mixopterus from Ludlowian deposits of Ringerike, Norway. The specimens referred to Eurypterus dolichoschelus were described in further detail and referred to Mixopterus. An almost complete, but weathered specimen (T. 3357) from the collection of the Geological Survey of Scotland, in Edinburgh, was taken as the holotype of Mixopterus dolichoschelus.

Further specimens discovered during the second half of the twentieth century and ones discovered in several national and university museum collections allowed a full description of the morphology and a more accurate assessment of the taxonomic position of the species. Ritchie (1968) presented evidence that suggested that M. dolichoschelus was not as closely related to the other species of Mixopterus as previously thought and placed it in its own genus within the Mixopteridae, Lanarkopterus. Lamsdell (2025) classified Lanarkopterus and Terropterus in the family Lanarkopteridae, distinct from Mixopteridae.

== See also ==
- List of eurypterids
- Mixopterus
