= Ramalho =

Ramalho is a Portuguese surname. Ramalho may refer to:

== People ==
- João Ramalho (1493–1580), Portuguese explorer
- Ramalho Ortigão (1836–1915), Portuguese writer
- Rosa Ramalho (1888–1977), Portuguese ceramist
- José Ramalho (rower) (1901–1967), Brazilian rower
- José Mauro Ramalho (1925–2019), Brazilian bishop
- António Ramalho Eanes (born 1935), Portuguese politician
- Josias Ramalho (1937–1988), Brazilian volleyball player
- Zé Ramalho (born 1949), Brazilian composer
- Elba Ramalho (born 1951), Brazilian musician
- Eliseu Ramalho (born 1952), Portuguese footballer
- João Ramalho (footballer) (born 1954), Portuguese footballer
- Muricy Ramalho (born 1955), Brazilian footballer and football manager
- José Luiz Aguiar e Ramalho (born 1963), Brazilian handball player
- Renato Ramalho (born 1967), Brazilian medley swimmer
- Ramalho (footballer, born 1978), Brazilian footballer
- Ramalho (footballer, born 1980), Brazilian footballer
- Mariana Barbosa Ramalho (born 1987), Brazilian rugby sevens player
- André Ramalho (born 1992), Brazilian footballer
- Leah-Marie Ramalho (born 1992), Guyanese footballer
- Jonás Ramalho (born 1993), Spanish footballer

== Places ==
- João Ramalho (municipality), municipality in Brazil
- Serra do Ramalho, Bahia, municipality in Brazil
- Serra do Ramalho, cave system in Brazil

== See also ==
- Ramallo (disambiguation)
