= Bourguyia bocaina =

Scientific classification
- Kingdom: Animalia
- Phylum: Arthropoda
- Subphylum: Chelicerata
- Class: Arachnida
- Order: Opiliones
- Family: Gonyleptidae
- Genus: Bourguyia; Mello-Leitão, 1923
- Species: B. bocaina

Binomial name
- Bourguyia bocaina Yamaguti & Pinto-da-Rocha, 2009

Species of harvestman

Bourguyia bocaina is a species of harvestman in the subfamily Bourguyiinae. It is endemic to Brazil.

== Taxonomy and etymology ==
The species was first formally described in 2009 by Humberto Y. Yamaguti and Ricardo Pinto-Da-Rocha. The specific name of Bourguyia bocaina comes from Serra da Bocaina, where it is endemic.

== Description ==
Like other species of the subfamily Bourguyiinae, Bourguyia bocaina has a pear-shaped body.

The body is a uniform reddish-brown (this turns brown when preserved) that is darker on the underside, with minute black spots. The dorsal scutum measures 6.4–6.7 mm long and of 7.0–7.7 mm wide in males and 6.4–6.8 mm long and 6.6–7.3 mm wide in females. It has very faint white grooves along with some small white spots. On the second free tergite is a large, nearly black spine, flanked by two smaller ones of the same color. Females have a slightly longer middle spine. The chelicerae, pedipalps, and most of the coxae and trochanters are yellow slightly reticulated with green. The coxa of the fourth pair of legs are the same color as the body, with the trochanters and femurs of these legs being a darker reddish brown. Everything beyond the femurs, as well as everything beyond the trochanters in the other legs, are almost completely green.
