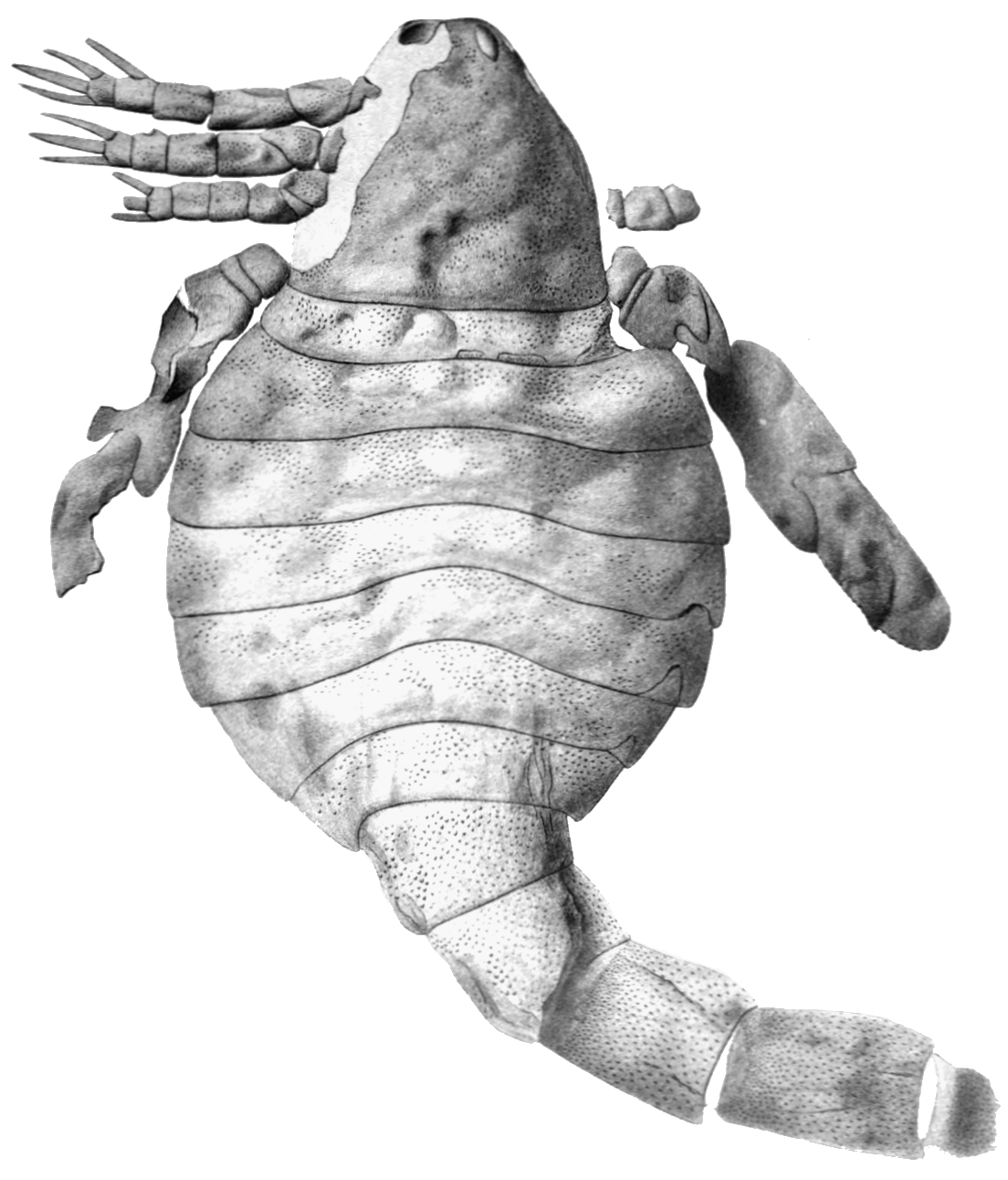
- Fossil of E. scorpionis.

Scientific classification
- Kingdom: Animalia
- Phylum: Arthropoda
- Subphylum: Chelicerata
- Order: †Eurypterida
- Superfamily: †Carcinosomatoidea
- Family: †Carcinosomatidae
- Genus: †Eusarcana; Strand, 1942

Type species
- †Eusarcana scorpionis (Grote & Pitt, 1875)

Species
- †E. acrocephalus (Semper, 1898); †E. scorpionis (Grote & Pitt, 1875); †E. spiniferum (Kjellesvig-Waering & Heubusch, 1962)

Synonyms
- Genus synonymy: Eusarcus Grote & Pitt, 1875, preoccupied; Paracarcinosoma Caster & Kjellesvig-Waering, 1964; Alternative combinations: Eurypterus acrocephalus Semper, 1898; Carcinosoma acrocephalus (Semper, 1898); Carcinosoma scorpionis (Grote & Pitt, 1875); Carcinosoma spiniferum (Kjellesvig-Waering & Heubusch, 1962)

= Eusarcana =

Eusarcana Temporal range: Middle Silurian–Early Devonian, 433–412.3 Ma

Extinct genus of sea scorpions

Eusarcana (meaning "true flesh") is a genus of eurypterid, an extinct group of aquatic arthropods. Fossils of Eusarcana have been discovered in deposits ranging in age from the Early Silurian to the Early Devonian. Classified as part of the family Carcinosomatidae, the genus contains three species, E. acrocephalus from Scotland and E. scorpionis and E. spiniferum from the United States.

Eusarcana is known for its odd proportions and features; the broad abdomen, thin and long tail, spined and forward-facing walking appendages and sharp and curved tail spike differentiate it from most other eurypterids, but are shared with other carcinosomatid eurypterids. The triangular carapace, oddly positioned forward-facing eyes differentiate the genus further from its closest relatives. Eusarcana was a moderately large species of eurypterid, measuring 70–80 centimetres (27.6–31.5 in) in length.

Originally described under the name Eusarcus, this name was preoccupied by a genus of living harvestmen in the family Gonyleptidae. Following the discovery of this homonym, the genus was also wrongly recognized as synonymous with the related Carcinosoma and was only given replacement names for the older name decades after the error was discovered, first as Eusarcana in 1942 and later as Paracarcinosoma (assumed to have been named without knowledge of the earlier replacement name) in 1964.

== Description ==
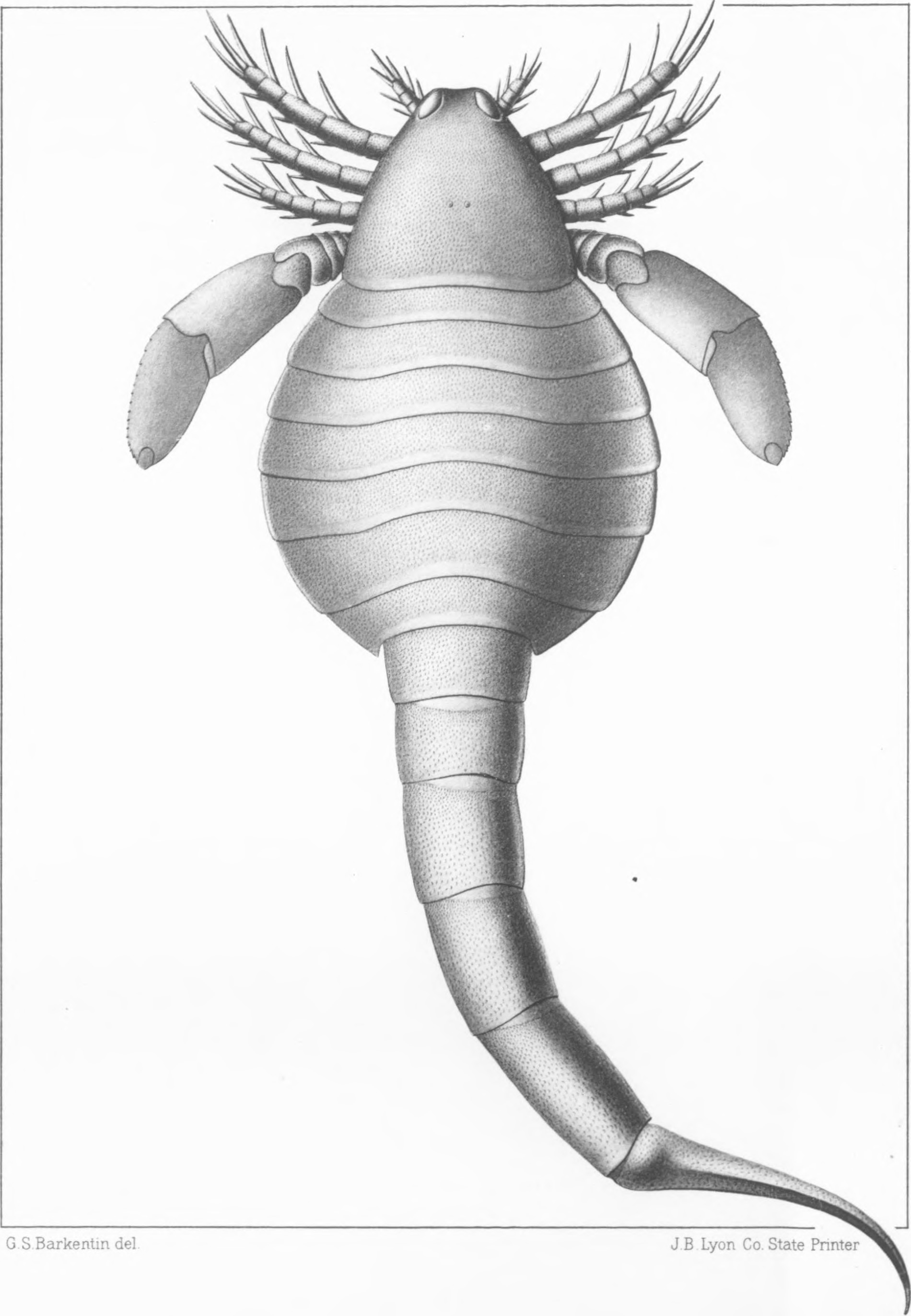
1912 reconstruction of E. scorpionis.

Eusarcana can be differentiated from other eurypterids by the considerably narrow border between the prosoma (head) and opisthosoma (abdomen), which is particularly thin considering the subsequent broad and large ellipse-shape of the abdomen. The postabdomen (or tail) also narrows rather quickly from the preceding segments. Further features distinctive of the genus include that the carapace (segment covering the head) is clearly triangular in shape, with eyes placed on the rim of it and positioned forwards, the fact that all walking legs possess spines and that they decrease in length the further back they were placed as well as the cylindrically shaped and sharp telson (the posteriormost division of the body).

In comparison with many other eurypterids, Eusarcana was a rather large animal, with the largest species (also the type species) E. scorpionis reaching lengths of 80 cm (31.5 in). E. spiniferum was similar in size, reaching lengths of 70 centimeters (27.6 in).

The appearance of Eusarcana is somewhat odd in comparison with other eurypterids, not only in its overall shape and proportions but also in that the surface of its exoskeleton is covered in small scale-like ornamentation that is circular in shape, crowded and small in size which differentiates it from other eurypterids in which such ornamentation is usually triangular. Overall, Eusarcana is mostly similar in appearance to other carcinosomatid eurypterids, particularly Carcinosoma which shares its forwardly positioned eyes, and is primarily defined by the small degree of spinosity on its second to fifth pair of appendages and its curved telson.

== History of research ==
=== Original description and subsequent discoveries ===
Eusarcana was first described as "Eusarcus" by the American geologists August R. Grote and William Henry Pitt based on fossils recovered from the Pridoli-age Buffalo Waterlime of New York State. This name derives from the Ancient Greek εὖ, (eu-) meaning "true", and σάρξ (sarx), meaning "flesh", meaning "true flesh". The designated type species was E. scorpionis. Though Grote and Pitt did not provide a generic diagnosis for the genus, the species was well diagnosed with a number of distinctive characters. Furthermore, the genus of Grote and Pitt was seemingly based solely on outlines and shape, which prompted some researchers, such as the prominent English geologist Henry Woodward, to regard the genus as lacking generic characters and as such being invalid, referring E. scorpionis to Eurypterus on the grounds that several British species of Eurypterus, notably E. scorpiodes and E. punctatus (today recognized as species of Carcinosoma), were similar in shape.

Unbeknownst to Grote and Pitt, Eusarcus had already been named as a genus of extant (currently living) laniatorid harvestmen of the family Gonyleptidae, in 1833 and as such constituted a preoccupied name. The preoccupied nature of the name was not immediately recognized, and it continued to be used for eurypterid species described in the late 19th to early 20th centuries.

In 1912, American paleontologists John Mason Clarke & Rudolf Ruedemann declared that the differences between Eusarcus and all related forms of eurypterids were so great that it was "entirely evident" that Eusarcus was distinct from other eurypterids. They referred the Scottish Wenlock-age Eurypterus species E. obesus (described by English geologist Henry Woodward in 1868) to the genus, alongside the Pridoli-Lochkovian-age Czech species E. acrocephalus (described by Austrian paleontologist Max Semper in 1898) on the grounds of both possessing triangular carapaces similar to E. scorpionis as well as an abruptly narrowing postabdomen. Furthermore, Clarke and Ruedemann concluded that Eusarcus was sufficiently similar to the related Carcinosoma to be designated as synonymous with it. As Eusarcus had been named earlier than Carcinosoma, the taxonomical laws of priority dictated that Eusarcus would be the name of the taxon.

E. acrocephalus (sometimes referred to erroneously as "E. acrocephala") can be distinguished from the other two species by the strongly recurved lateral sides of its carapace, the oval mesosoma and the first segment of the metasoma being unusually wide and short for the genus. The holotype of E. acrocephalus, UW 1906/V/2 discovered in the Požáry Formation of the Czech Republic, is composed of the carapace and a partial abdomen, portions of which were broken off during bombing runs on Prague during the Second World War, during which the National Museum of Prague was damaged.

The obesity of the opisthosomal (abdominal) segments in E. obesus is its most remarkable feature (and is also what lends the species its name), the fourth segment is as wide as the first eight segments combined are long. The surface of the exoskeleton of the carapace and the segments is thin and seemingly lacks ornamentation. In 2014, American paleontologist James Lamsdell suggested that E. obesus may represent a juvenile of the related and contemporary Carcinosoma scorpioides. Unlike other species of Eusarcana, E. obesus does not appear to possess spines on its appendages. Carcinosoma scorpioides was referred to the new genus Cruinnopterus by Lamsdell (2025), and E. obesus was designated as a junior synonym of that species.

Lamsdell (2025) also transferred the species Carcinosoma spiniferum to Eusarcana. E. spiniferum is known from the Silurian of New York, from a single prosomal appendage that preserves some elongated spines. The appendage is much less robust than the appendage of Carcinosoma newlini, the Carcinosoma type species, and is more similar to that of E. scorpionis.

=== Recognition as preoccupied name ===
It was first in 1934, 59 years after its original description, that Eusarcus was recognized as a name preoccupied by a harvestman. The Norwegian geologist Leif Størmer proposed that the name of the taxon should be next oldest available and valid name for the genus, Carcinosoma. During the preparation for his paper on the issue, Størmer also discussed the situation with fellow Norwegian researcher Embrik Strand, who helped confirm that Carcinosoma was not preoccupied.

Strand would subsequently propose the replacement name Eusarcana in 1942, despite the problem having been dealt with by Størmer, who he had been in contact with eight years earlier. The reasons for proposing the name during the circumstances of the time remains unknown, but contemporary researchers critiquing Strand for his studies in systematics and an apparent desire to name as many taxa as possible may explain the situation somewhat. As it was seen as completely unnecessary at the time, Strand's Eusarcana was overlooked and not even mentioned in subsequent eurypterid studies. The naming of Eusarcana was one of many contributions to nomenclature by Strand seen as unhelpful today. His journal Folia Zoologica et Hydrobiologica would later re-emerge within the field to create all kinds of systematic problems that could have been avoided. Strand was also notorious for applying new species names to incomplete or poorly preserved fossils.

In 1964, American paleontologists Kenneth Edward Caster and Erik N. Kjellesvig-Waering recognized Eusarcus and Carcinosoma to be distinct genera when revising the superfamily Carcinosomatoidea, and coined the replacement name Paracarcinosoma to designate the species previously assigned to Eusarcus. E. scorpionis was designated the type species. Caster and Kjellesvig-Waering made no mention of Embrik Strand or Eusarcana, and they were likely not aware of the existence of the previous name. With Eusarcana all but forgotten, all subsequent researchers used Paracarcinosoma for the genus.

In 2012, American paleontologists Jason A. Dunlop and James Lamsdell noted that whilst the name Eusarcana had been completely unnecessary (and of questionable validity, as Strand did not designate a type species) at the time of its creation, it is the oldest available valid name for the taxon and as such should constitute its name under the rules of priority, despite Paracarcinosoma being more widely used. As such, Paracarcinosoma was designated as a junior synonym, with all three species assigned to it being transferred to Eusarcana.

== Classification ==
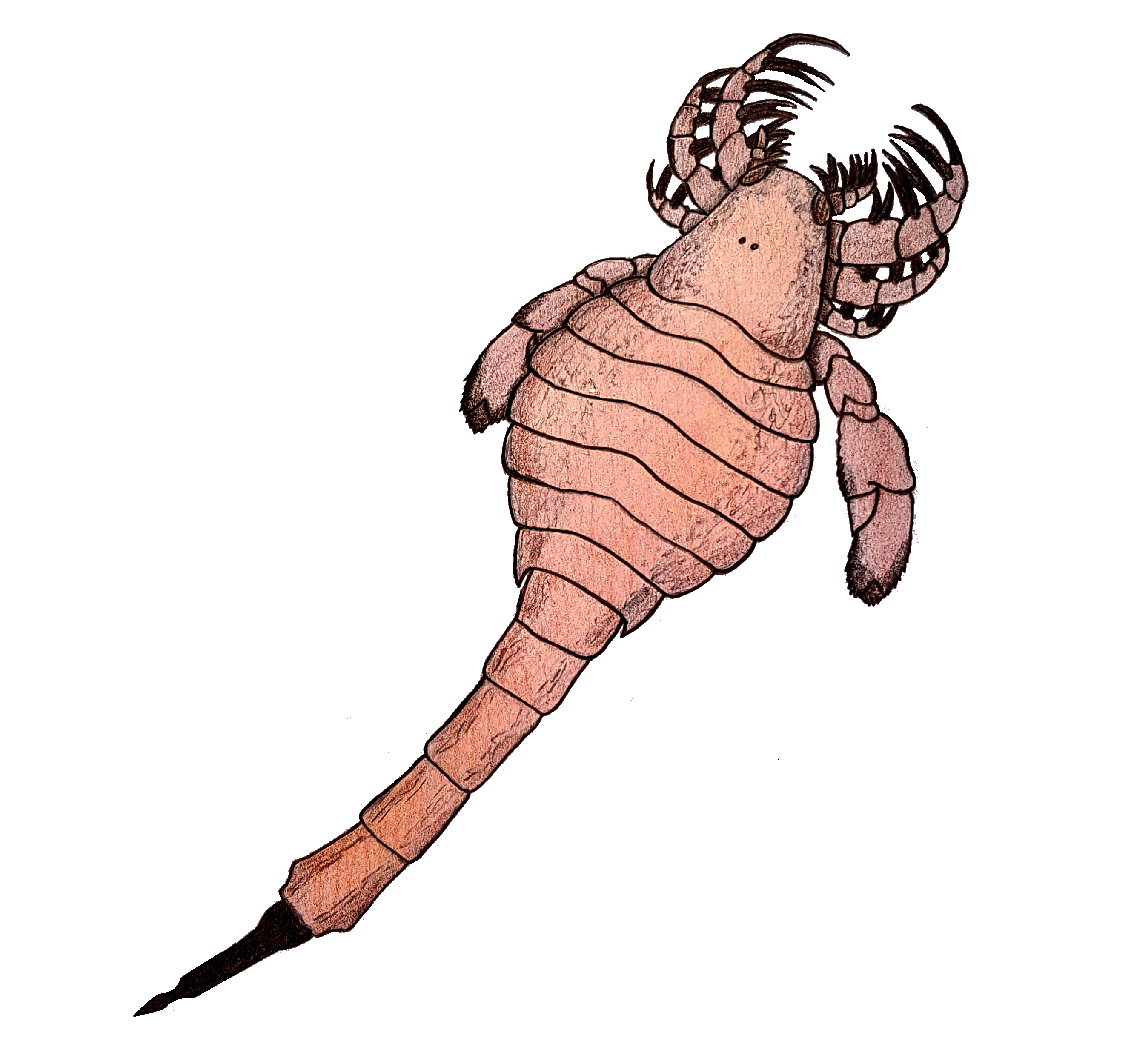
Restoration of Carcinosoma newlini, a related carcinosomatid species

Eusarcana is classified as part of the family Carcinosomatidae, a family within the superfamily Carcinosomatoidea, alongside the genera Carcinosoma, Eocarcinosoma, Rhinocarcinosoma and possibly Holmipterus. The cladogram below is adapted from a larger cladogram (simplified to only display the Carcinosomatoidea) in a 2007 study by eurypterid researcher O. Erik Tetlie, in turn based on results from various phylogenetic analyses on eurypterids conducted between 2004 and 2007. The second cladogram below is simplified from a study by Lamsdell et al. (2015).

Tetlie (2007)

- Carcinosomatoidea
  - - Carcinosoma newlini
    - - - Eusarcana scorpionis
        - Rhinocarcinosoma vaningeni
      - - Carcinosoma scoticus
        - Carcinosoma scorpiodes
        - - Mixopterus multispinosus
          - - Mixopterus simonsoni
            - Mixopterus kiaeri

Lamsdell et al. (2015)

- Carcinosomatoidea
  - - Megalograptidae
    - - Mixopteridae
      - Carcinosomatidae
        - Holmipterus suecicus
        - Rhinocarcinosoma vaningeni
        - - - Carcinosoma newlini
            - Carcinosoma libertyi
          - - Eusarcana acrocephalus
            - Eusarcana scorpionis

== Paleobiology ==
The size of E. scorpionis, the largest and best known species of Eusarcana, compared to a human.

The features of Eusarcana indicate that its lifestyle was completely different from many other swimming eurypterids, such as Eurypterus. When walking, Eusarcana would likely have lifted the eye-bearing frontal part of its head above the ground, as indicated by the larger size of the forward walking legs and the placement of the eyes. In contrast, Eurypterus would have kept its head, shovel-shaped and broad, down to the ground while walking. Furthermore, the walking legs of Eusarcana are more powerful than those of Eurypterus in general. The legs decrease in strength the further back they are, indicating that there was an emphasis on lifting the front of the carapace. In Eurypterus the legs are the longest the further back they are, which indicates that it would have had an emphasis on keeping the head down.

The swimming legs of Eusarcana were powerfully developed, with paddles both longer and broader than those of Eurypterus, which corresponds to the fact that Eusarcana was a broader and heavier genus of eurypterids.

=== Tail spike ===
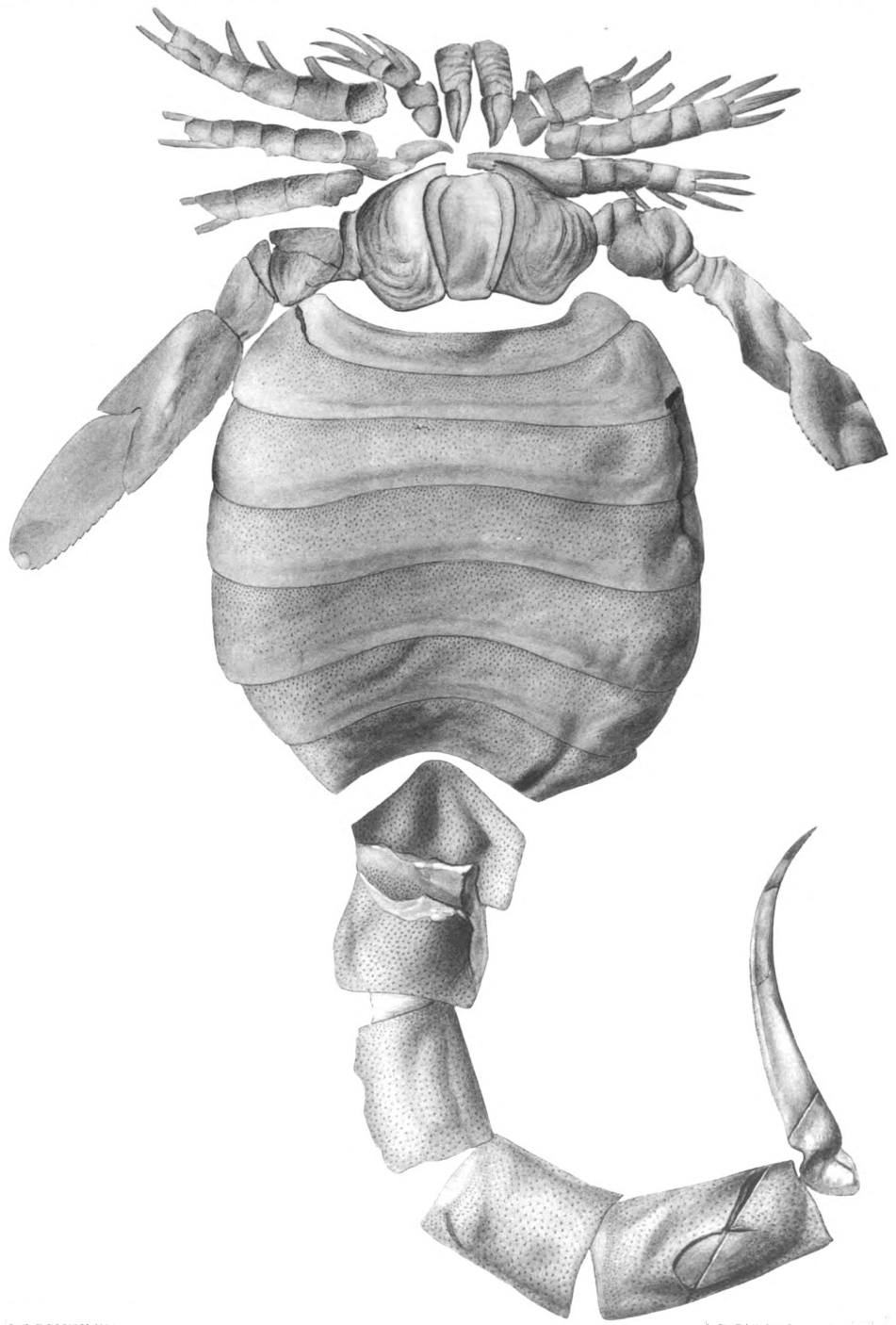
Fossil specimen of E. scorpionis with intact tail spike.

In the Pridoli-age Buffalo waterlime fauna where E. scorpionis lived, it represented one of the larger members of the ecosystem, being at least half as long as the larger predatory eurypterids of the genus Pterygotus. With Eusarcana not having large and powerful pincers like the larger pterygotid eurypterids, which not only represented potential competitors but also dangerous predators, the only obvious organ it could use for defense was the pointed and sharp tail spike.

The narrowed tail is so long and extended that it exceeds the principal parts of the body, the head and abdomen, in length. The fact that the tail has been preserved as curved in several fossil specimens proves that it would have been flexible in life, with the apparent curvature of the spike on its end making it a dangerous weapon. If curved forwards over the rest of the body, the spike would be positioned with its point turned upwards, effectively acting similar to a scimitar.

The similarity between the spike of Eusarcana and that of scorpions opens up the possibility that the tail spike might possibly have possessed poison glands. Though the state in which the specimens have been preserved does not allow determination of either the absence or presence of a poison canal or pores for transferring the venom to potential victims, the shape of Eusarcana suggests that it was a rather slow and inactive animal that was not very agile, possibly adapted for burrowing or ambush predation. In such a lifestyle, a venomous and agile tail spike would greatly aid in securing prey and defense in absence of other prehensile and powerful organs with long reach.

=== Ecology ===
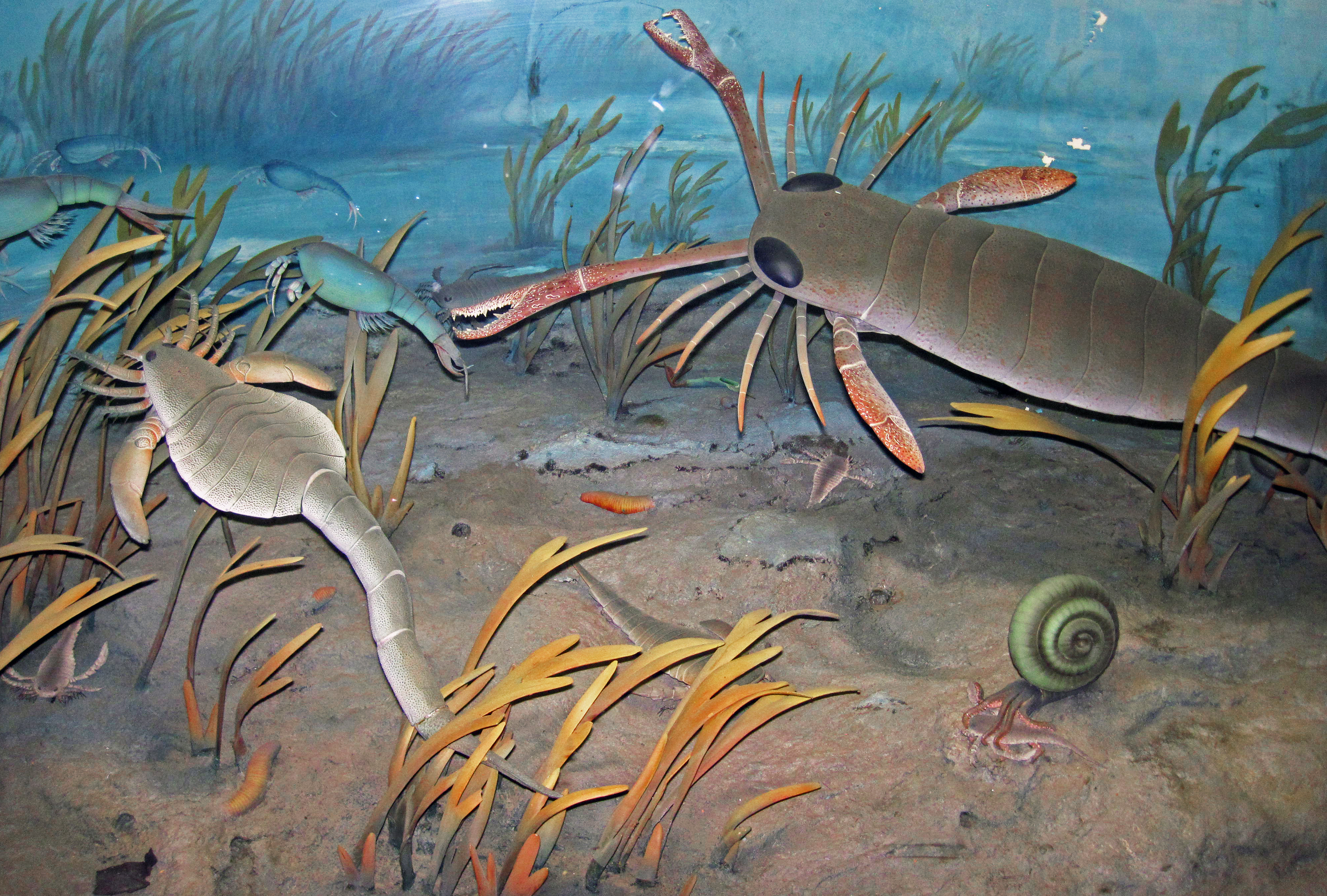
Restoration model of a Eusarcana in a Silurian seafloor, along with other eurypterids and animals

As a considerable majority of described eurypterid species are known from the Silurian, particularly the late Silurian, researchers have concluded that the group peaked in diversity and number during this time. Complex eurypterid faunas, compromising several different species in different ecological roles, are typical of the period. All species of Eusarcana described so far occur together with other eurypterid species. E. acrocephalus is known from both the Silurian and the Devonian of the Czech Republic, with a somewhat apparent difference in other fauna depending on the time period. Devonian E. acrocephalus occur together with other eurypterids Slimonia, Pterygotus and Acutiramus as well as with various trilobites (including Crotalocephalina, Otarion, Warburgella, Proetus, Tropidocare, Leonaspis and Ceratocephala), crustaceans (including Ceratiocaris and Aristozoe), ostracods, conodonts, gastropods and crinoids. The Silurian-aged fauna of the same general area, also preserving E. acrocephalus, were home to other eurypterids Erettopterus, Pterygotus and Acutiramus, a less diverse assemblage of trilobites (Otarion, Scharyia and Prionopeltis), crustacean Ceratiocaris, cephalopods (including Cycloceras and Corbuloceras), ostracods, gastropods, crinoids, conodonts and bivalves.

In Silurian deposits of New York, E. scorpionis and E. spiniferium occur together with a diverse fauna of eurypterids composed of Buffalopterus, Dolichopterus, Erettopterus, Eurypterus, Pterygotus and Acutiramus. Also present were xiphosurans, crustaceans (Gonatocaris), ostracods, bivalves, gastropods and cephalopods. Carcinosomatid eurypterids such as Eusarcana were among the most marine eurypterids, known from deposits that were once reefs, some in lagoonal settings, and deeper waters.

== See also ==
- List of eurypterid genera
- Timeline of eurypterid research
