= Metagyndes innatus =

Scientific classification
- Kingdom: Animalia
- Phylum: Arthropoda
- Subphylum: Chelicerata
- Class: Arachnida
- Order: Opiliones
- Family: Gonyleptidae
- Genus: Metagyndes
- Species: M. innatus

Binomial name
- Metagyndes innatus (Roewer, 1929)

Species of harvestman

Metagyndes innatus is a harvestman of the family Gonyleptidae found in Chile.
