= Bourguyia =

Scientific classification
- Kingdom: Animalia
- Phylum: Arthropoda
- Subphylum: Chelicerata
- Class: Arachnida
- Order: Opiliones
- Superfamily: Gonyleptoidea
- Family: Gonyleptidae
- Subfamily: Bourguyiinae
- Genus: Bourguyia; Mello-Leitão, 1923

Type species
- Bourguyia albiornata Mello-Leitão, 1923

Species
- See text

Diversity
- 6 species

Genus of harvestmen

Bourguyia is a genus of harvestmen in the family Gonyleptidae with six described species (as of 2026). All species are found in Brazil.

== Description ==
The genus Bourguyia was described by Mello-Leitão with the type species Bourguyia albiornata Mello-Leitão, 1923.

== Species ==
These species belong to the genus Bourguyia:

- Bourguyia albiornata Mello-Leitão, 1923 – Brazil (São Paulo, Paraná)
- Bourguyia bocaina Yamaguti & Pinto-da-Rocha, 2009 – Brazil (São Paulo)
- Bourguyia laevibunus (Roewer, 1930) – Brazil (Pernambuco (?), Rio de Janeiro, Espírito Santo (?))
- Bourguyia maculata (Roewer, 1930) – Brazil (Rio de Janeiro, etc.)
- Bourguyia trochanteralis (Roewer, 1930) – Brazil (Minas Gerais, São Paulo, etc.)
- Bourguyia vinosa Yamaguti & Pinto-da-Rocha, 2009 – Brazil (São Paulo)

== Etymology ==
The genus is feminine. Named after Hermílio Bourguy Macedo de Mendonça.
