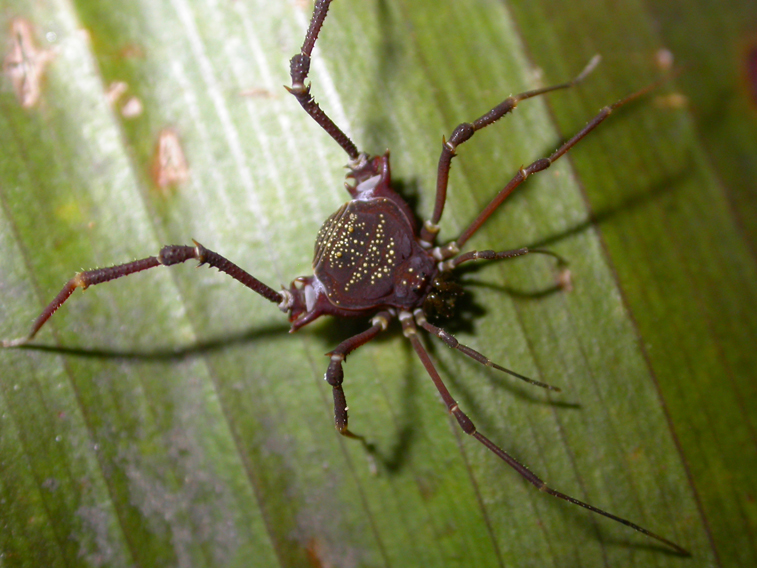
- Lacronia ceci Kury & Orrico, 2006, from Brazil.

Scientific classification
- Kingdom: Animalia
- Phylum: Arthropoda
- Subphylum: Chelicerata
- Class: Arachnida
- Order: Opiliones
- Family: Gonyleptidae
- Subfamily: Pachylinae; Sørensen, 1884

Genera
- See text for list.

= Pachylinae =

Subfamily of harvestmen/daddy longlegs

Pachylinae is the most diverse subfamily of the harvestman family Gonyleptidae, including around 400 valid species. Major groups of species occur in the Brazilian Atlantic forest, Bolivian/Peruvian highlands, Argentina, and Chilean temperate forest.

== Genera ==
Currently, 129 genera are recognised:

- Acanthopachylopsis H. E. M. Soares & B. A. Soares, 1949
- Acanthopachylus Roewer, 1913
- Acanthoprocta Loman, 1899
- Acrographinotus Roewer, 1929 *= Unduavius Roewer, 1929
- Allogonyleptes Roewer, 1917
- Anoplogynopsis H. Soares, 1966
- Anoplogynus Piza, 1938
- Antetriceras Roewer, 1949
- Berlaia Mello-Leitão, 1940
- Biconisoma Roewer, 1936
- Bristoweia Mello-Leitão, 1924
- Bullaepus Roewer, 1930
- Bunoplus Roewer, 1927
- Calcarogyndes Mello-Leitão, 1932
- Caldanatus Roewer, 1943
- Camposicola Mello-Leitão, 1924
- Camposicoloides B. Soares, 1944
- Capichabesia B. Soares, 1944
- Carlotta Roewer, 1943
- Ceratoleptes H. E. M. Soares & B. A. Soares, 1979
- Ceropachylinus Mello-Leitão, 1943
- Ceropachylus Mello-Leitão, 1942
- Chaquesia B. Soares, 1944
- Chauveaua Canals, 1939
- Chilebalta Roewer, 1961
- Chilegyndes Roewer, 1961
- Corralia Roewer, 1913
- Discocyrtulus Roewer, 1927
- Discocyrtus Holmberg, 1878
- Eopachyloides H. Soares, 1970
- Eopachylus Mello-Leitão, 1931
- Ergastria Mello-Leitão, 1941
- Eubalta Roewer, 1923
- Eugyndes Roewer, 1923
- Eugyndopsiella H. Soares, 1972
- Eusarcus Perty, 1833
- = Pygophalangodus Mello-Leitão, 1931
- Fonckia Roewer, 1913
- = Diconospelta Canals, 1934
- Giupponia Pérez & Kury, 2002
- Goodnightiella H. E. M. Soares & B. A. Soares, 1945
- Graphinotus C.L.Koch, 1839
- Guaraniticus Mello-Leitão, 1933
- Gyndesoides Mello-Leitão, 1933
- Gyndoides Mello-Leitão, 1927
- Gyndulus Roewer, 1929 [inc synonyomy *Beckeresia H. Soares, 1970 per Kury, Mendes & Hara 2020]
- Harpachylus Roewer, 1943
- Huadquina Roewer, 1930
- Huasampillia Roewer, 1913
- Huralvioides H. Soares, 1970
- Hyperpachylus Roewer, 1957
- Hypophyllonomus Giltay, 1928
- Iandumoema Pinto-da-Rocha, 1996
- Ibarra Roewer, 1925
- Iguassua Mello-Leitão, 1935
- Iguassuoides H. E. M. Soares & B. A. Soares, 1954
- Itatiaincola H. E. M. Soares & B. A. Soares, 1948
- Izecksohnopilio H. Soares, 1977
- Junicus Goodnight & Goodnight, 1947
- Juticus Roewer, 1943
- Kuryella Özdikmen, 2006
- Lacronia Strand, 1942
- Marayniocus Acosta, 2005
- Maromba H. E. M. Soares & B. A. Soares, 1954
- Metabalta Roewer, 1913
- Metadiscocyrtus Roewer, 1929
- Metagraphinotus Mello-Leitão, 1927
- Metagyndes Roewer, 1913
- Metagyndoides Mello-Leitão, 1931
- Metalycomedes Mello-Leitão, 1927
- Metapachyloides Roewer, 1917
- Metaphalangodella Roewer, 1915
- Meteusarcoides Mello-Leitão, 1922
- Meteusarcus Roewer, 1913
- Neogonyleptes Roewer, 1913
- Neopachylus Roewer, 1913
- Neopucroliella Roewer, 1931
- Ogloblinia Canals, 1933
- Oliverius H. E. M. Soares & B. A. Soares, 1945
- Osornogyndes Maury, 1993
- Pachylibunus Roewer, 1913
- Pachyloidellus Müller, 1918
- Pachyloides Holmberg, 1878
- Pachylus C.L.Koch, 1839
- Pachylusius Mello-Leitão, 1949
- Palcapachylus Roewer, 1952
- Parabalta Roewer, 1913
- Paradiscocyrtus Mello-Leitão, 1927
- Paraluederwaldtia Mello-Leitão, 1927
- Parapachyloides Roewer, 1913
- Paraphalangodus Roewer, 1915
- Paraprosontes H. E. M. Soares & B. A. Soares, 1947
- Parapucrolia Roewer, 1917
- Pareusarcus Roewer, 1929
- Passosa Roewer, 1927
- Pherania Strand, 1942
- Pichitus Roewer, 1959
- Pirunipygus Roewer, 1936
- Planiphalangodus Roewer, 1929
- Platygyndes Roewer, 1943
- Polyacanthoprocta Mello-Leitão, 1927
- Progyndes Roewer, 1917
- Pseudoacrographinotus H. Soares, 1966
- Pseudogyndes Mello-Leitão, 1932
- Pseudogyndesoides B. Soares, 1944
- Pucrolia Sørensen, 1895
- Pulocria Mello-Leitão, 1935
- Punagraphinotus Soares & Bauab-Vianna, 1972
- Punrunata Roewer, 1952
- Qorimayus Acosta, 2020
- Rhioxyna Soares & Bauab-Vianna, 1970
- Riosegundo Canals, 1943
- Roeweria Mello-Leitão, 1923
- Sadocus Sørensen in L.Koch 1886
- Schubartesia B. Soares, 1944
- Singram Mello-Leitão, 1937
- Soaresia H. Soares, 1945
- Spinivunus Roewer, 1943
- Tarmapachylus Roewer, 1956
- Temucus Roewer, 1943
- Tingomaria Mello-Leitão in Mello-Leitão & Araujo Feio, 1948
- Triglochinura Mello-Leitão, 1924
- Trochanteroceros Canals, 1935
- Tumbesia Loman, 1899
- Ubatubesia B. Soares, 1945
- Uropachylus Mello-Leitão, 1922
- Victoriaincola H. E. M. Soares & B. A. Soares, 1946
- Yraguara Mello-Leitão, 1937
