= Caelopygus =

Scientific classification
- Domain: Eukaryota
- Kingdom: Animalia
- Phylum: Arthropoda
- Subphylum: Chelicerata
- Class: Arachnida
- Order: Opiliones
- Family: Gonyleptidae
- Subfamily: Caelopyginae
- Genus: Caelopygus; C.L. Koch, 1839

Genus of harvestmen/daddy longlegs

Caelopygus is a genus of harvestmen found solely in Brazil. It is placed in the sub-family Caelopyginae, and includes two species formerly placed in the genera Liarthrodes Mello-Leitão, 1922 and Heterarthrodes Mello-Leitão, 1935:

- Caelopygus elegans (Perty, 1833)
- Caelopygus melanocephalus C. L. Koch in Hahn & C. L. Koch, 1839
