= Caelopygus elegans =

Scientific classification
- Domain: Eukaryota
- Kingdom: Animalia
- Phylum: Arthropoda
- Subphylum: Chelicerata
- Class: Arachnida
- Order: Opiliones
- Family: Gonyleptidae
- Genus: Caelopygus
- Species: C. elegans

Binomial name
- Caelopygus elegans (Perty, 1833)

Synonyms
- Gonyleptes elegans Perty, 1833

Species of harvestman/daddy longlegs

Caelopygus elegans is a species of harvestmen in the genus Caelopygus. It is found in Brazil.
