= Giupponia =

Scientific classification
- Domain: Eukaryota
- Kingdom: Animalia
- Phylum: Arthropoda
- Subphylum: Chelicerata
- Class: Arachnida
- Order: Opiliones
- Family: Gonyleptidae
- Subfamily: Pachylinae
- Genus: Giupponia; Pérez & Kury, 2002
- Species: G. chagasi

Binomial name
- Giupponia chagasi Pérez & Kury, 2002

Genus of harvestmen/daddy longlegs

Giupponia is a monotypic genus of the harvestman family Gonyleptidae. The only described species, G. chagasi, was found in two limestone caves in Serra do Ramalho, Bahia State, Brazil.

The long-legged species features several adaptations to cave life, such as complete eyelessness and lack of pigmentation.

== Name ==
The genus and species are named after arachnologist Alessandro Ponce de Leão Giupponi and myriapodologist Amazonas Chagas Júnior, respectively.
