= Asarcus =

Scientific classification
- Domain: Eukaryota
- Kingdom: Animalia
- Phylum: Arthropoda
- Subphylum: Chelicerata
- Class: Arachnida
- Order: Opiliones
- Superfamily: Gonyleptoidea
- Family: Gonyleptidae
- Subfamily: Bourguyiinae
- Genus: Asarcus; Koch, 1839

Type species
- Asarcus longipes Koch, 1839

Species
- See text

Diversity
- 4 species

Genus of harvestmen/daddy longlegs

Asarcus is a genus of harvestmen in the family Gonyleptidae with four described species (as of 2023). All species are found in Brazil.

== Description ==
The genus Asarcus was described by C. L. Koch with the type species Asarcus longipes Koch, 1839.

== Species ==
These species belong to the genus Asarcus:

- Asarcus ingenuus (Mello-Leitão, 1940) – Brazil (São Paulo, etc.)
- Asarcus longipes Koch, 1839 – Brazil (São Paulo, etc.)
- Asarcus passarellii (Mello-Leitão, 1941) – Brazil (Rio de Janeiro, etc.)
- Asarcus putunaberaba Yamaguti & Pinto-da-Rocha, 2009 – Brazil (Minas Gerais, etc.)

== Etymology ==
The genus is masculine.
