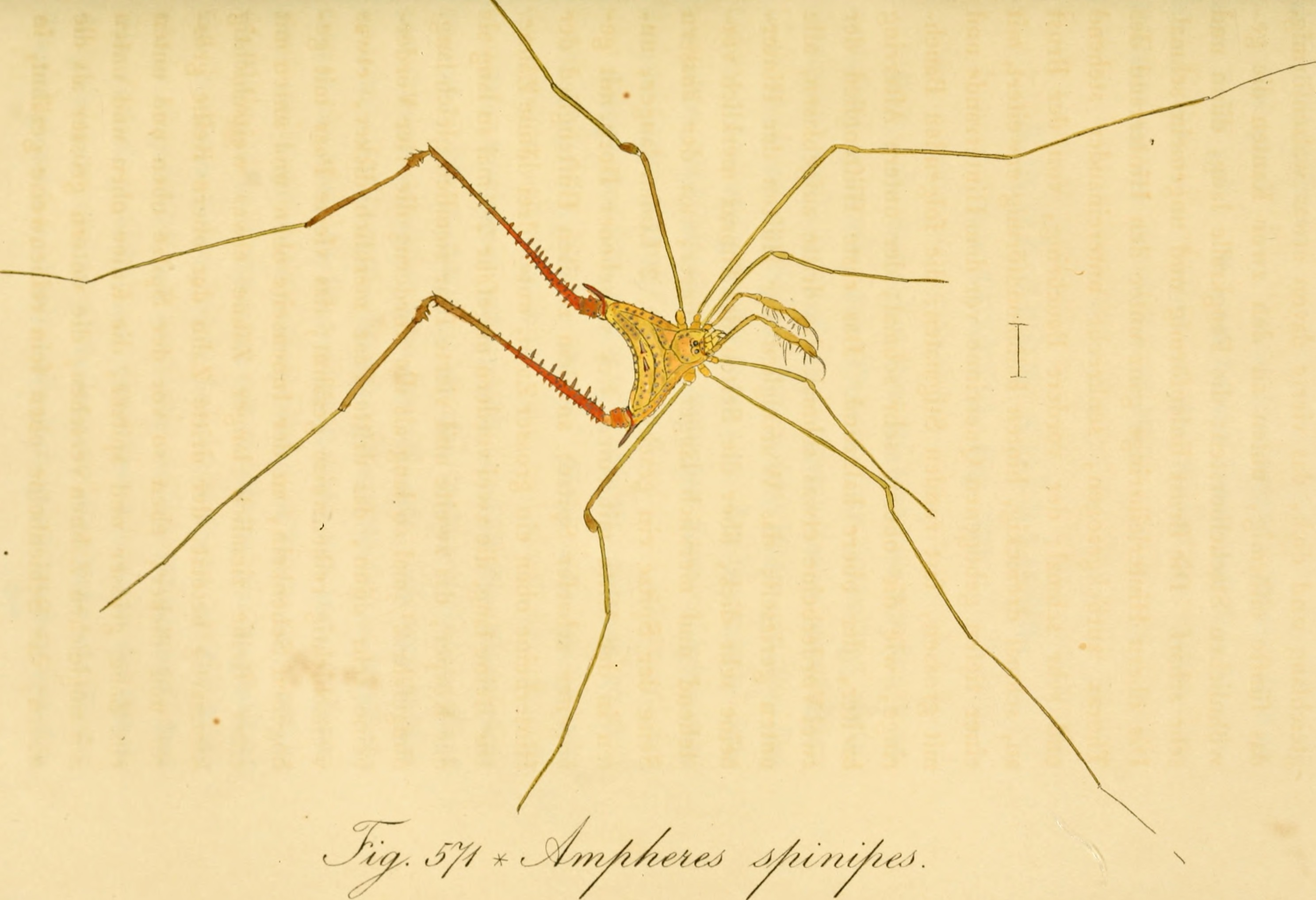
- Gonyleptes spinipes Perty, 1833 = Ampheres triangularis (Roewer, 1931)

Scientific classification
- Domain: Eukaryota
- Kingdom: Animalia
- Phylum: Arthropoda
- Subphylum: Chelicerata
- Class: Arachnida
- Order: Opiliones
- Family: Gonyleptidae
- Subfamily: Caelopyginae
- Genus: Ampheres; Koch, 1839

Type species
- Ampheres triangularis Roewer 1913: 334 (by subsequent designation)

Synonyms
- Coelopygulus Roewer 1931e etc [others to add]

= Ampheres (harvestman) =

Genus of arachnids

Ampheres is a genus of neotropical harvestmen

== Description ==
Ampheres are endemic to Southeastern Brazil. They are found in the states of São Paulo, Rio de Janeiro and Espírito Santo.

== Species ==
Ampheres contains the following species:

- Ampheres fuscopunctatus (Soares, 1942)
- Ampheres leucopheus (Mello-Leitão, 1922)
- Ampheres luteus (Giltay, 1928)
- Ampheres tocantinus Roewer, 1943
- Ampheres triangularis (Roewer, 1931)
