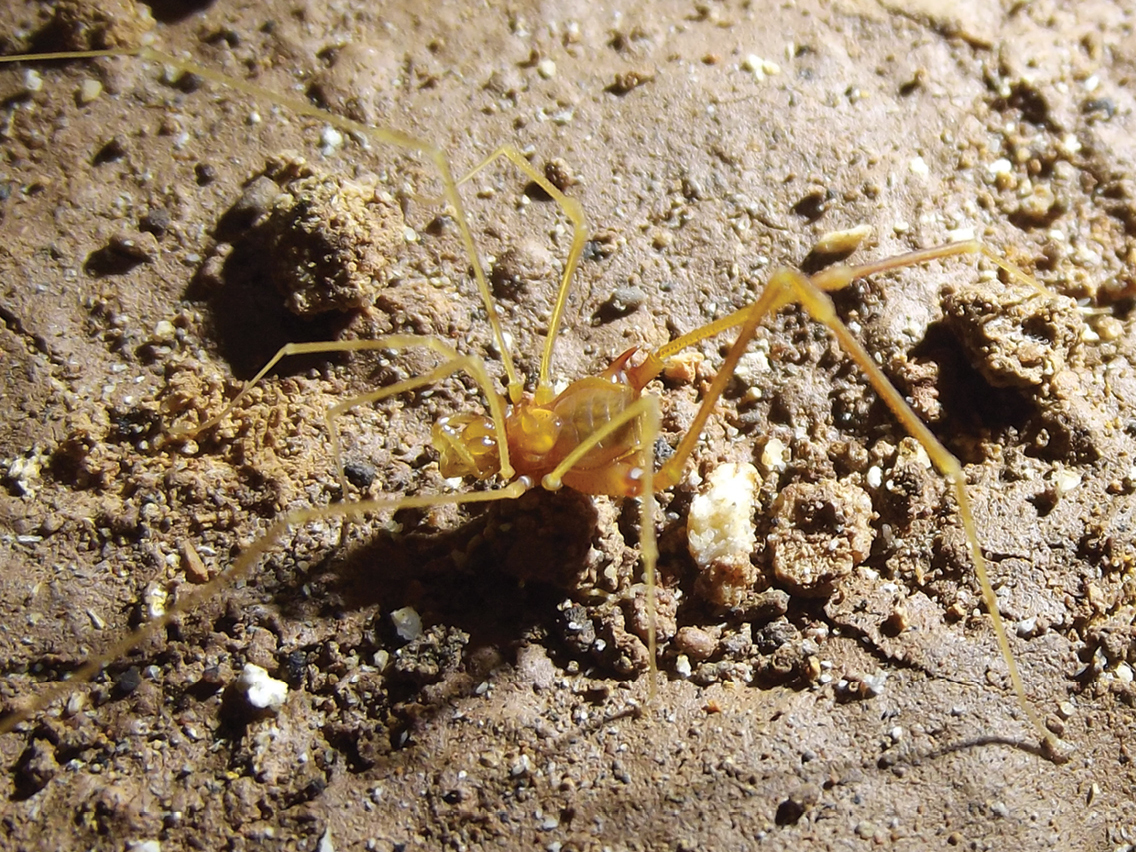
- Iandumoema smeagol

Scientific classification
- Domain: Eukaryota
- Kingdom: Animalia
- Phylum: Arthropoda
- Subphylum: Chelicerata
- Class: Arachnida
- Order: Opiliones
- Family: Gonyleptidae
- Subfamily: Pachylinae
- Genus: Iandumoema; Pinto-da-Rocha, 1996

Type species
- Iandumoema uai Pinto-da-Rocha, 1996

= Iandumoema =

Genus of harvestmen/daddy longlegs

Iandumoema is a genus of harvestmen, with three species: Iandumoema uai, I. setimapocu, and I. smeagol, each known only from caves in the state of Minas Gerais, Southeastern Brazil. The genus name derives from the Tupi language words iandu ("spider") and moema ("false"), in reference to the popular misconception that harvestmen are spiders. The species Iandumoema smeagol lacks eyes.
