= Ramallo =

Ramallo may refer to:

== People ==
- William Ramallo (born 1963), Bolivian footballer
- Tito Ramallo (born 1969), Spanish footballer
- Fernando Ramallo (born 1980), Spanish actor
- Rodrigo Ramallo (born 1990), Bolivian footballer
- Sofía Ramallo (born 2001), Argentine field hockey player
- Reverend Mother Ramallo, a fictional character from the Dune series

== Places in Argentina ==
- Ramallo, Buenos Aires
- Ramallo Partido
- Saint Francis Xavier Church of Ramallo

== Other ==
- Ramallo massacre, a 1999 massacre in Villa Ramallo, Argentina

== See also ==
- Ramalho (disambiguation)
