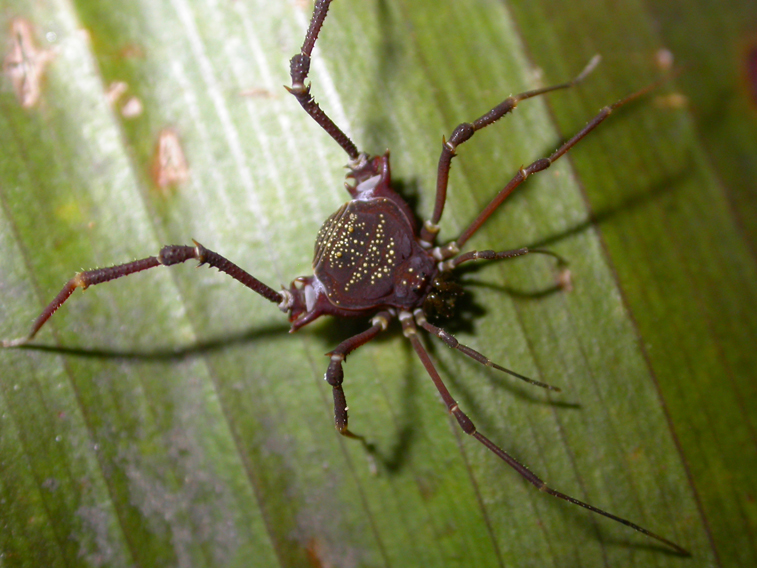
- Lacronia ceci from Brazil

Scientific classification
- Domain: Eukaryota
- Kingdom: Animalia
- Phylum: Arthropoda
- Subphylum: Chelicerata
- Class: Arachnida
- Order: Opiliones
- Family: Gonyleptidae
- Genus: Lacronia; Strand, 1942

Synonyms
- Luederwaldtia Mello-Leitão, 1923

= Lacronia =

Genus of harvestmen/daddy longlegs

Lacronia is a genus of South American harvestmen, which includes five Brazilian species. A striking diagnostic character is the trochanter IV of male with strong medial prolateral apophysis forming a pincer with the dorso-apical apophysis of coxa IV.

== Taxonomic history ==
This genus was at first named Luederwaldtia by Mello-Leitão in 1923, but the name was already preoccupied, being a junior homonym of Luederwaldtia Schmidt, 1922 (Hemiptera). Strand proposed the valid replacement name Lacronia, which was ignored by most subsequent authors and unearthed only 60 years later.

== Species ==
- Lacronia camboriu (Kury, 2003) – Santa Catarina
- Lacronia ceci (Kury & Orrico, 2006) – Rio de Janeiro
- Lacronia ricardoi (Kury, 2003) – São Paulo
- Lacronia serripes (Mello-Leitão, 1923) – São Paulo
- Lacronia utaru (Carvalho & Kury, 2024) – Paraná

== Ecological remarks ==
Lacronia ceci is the first species of the genus to be found in highlands away from the coast. The other three species of Lacronia are known from coastal environments: Lacronia serripes is known only from small islands. The other two were found in continental "restinga" biome. Individuals of both sexes of Lacronia ceci were found inside bamboo (Guadua taguara) hollows or in immediately surrounding areas. No individuals were found in other locations during diurnal collectings. Lacronia camboriu and L. ricardoi were found inside bromeliads, suggesting that the species of this genus are related to phytotelmata.
