= Neopachylus =

Scientific classification
- Domain: Eukaryota
- Kingdom: Animalia
- Phylum: Arthropoda
- Subphylum: Chelicerata
- Class: Arachnida
- Order: Opiliones
- Family: Gonyleptidae
- Genus: Neopachylus; Roewer, 1913

Genus of spiders

Neopachylus is a genus of harvestmen belonging to the family Gonyleptidae.

Species:

- Neopachylus bellicosus Roewer, 1913
- Neopachylus herteli Soares & Soares, 1945
- Neopachylus imaguirei Soares & Soares, 1947
- Neopachylus incertus (Mello-Leitão, 1935)
- Neopachylus mamillosus Roewer, 1915
- Neopachylus marginatus (Mello-Leitão, 1931)
- Neopachylus nebulosus (Mello-Leitão, 1936)
- Neopachylus serrinha Soares & Soares, 1947
- Neopachylus taioensis Soares, 1966
