= Serra do Ramalho =

Cave system in Bahia state, Brazil

Coordinates: 13.5719°S 43.5978°W

The caves of the Serro da Ramalho karst area in the municipality of Serra do Ramalho, a municipality of the same name in southwestern Bahia State, Brazil, have been explored since the early 2000s. The several large cave systems present a great biospeleological potential. Newly discovered species include the first troglobitic Amblypygi recorded for Brazil, Charinus troglobius Baptista & Giupponi, 2003, an eyeless harvestman (Giupponia chagasi Pérez & Kury, 2002), an as yet undescribed genus of spiders (Ochyroceratidae), and a species of catfish (Rhamdia enfurnada Bichuette & Trajano, 2005).
