= Caelopyginae =

Scientific classification
- Domain: Eukaryota
- Kingdom: Animalia
- Phylum: Arthropoda
- Subphylum: Chelicerata
- Class: Arachnida
- Order: Opiliones
- Family: Gonyleptidae
- Subfamily: Caelopyginae; Simon, 1879

Synonyms
- Dasypoleptinae, Mello-Leitão, 1949

Subfamily of harvestmen/daddy longlegs

Caelopyginae is a neotropical sub-family of harvestmen (order Opiliones) in the family Gonyleptidae.

== Genera ==
Caelopyginae contains the following genera:

- Ampheres Koch, 1839 – includes Prosodreana Giltay, 1928, Coelopygulus Roewer, 1931, Zalonius Mello-Leitão, 1936, Metampheroides Mello-Leitão, 1941 and Pizaius Soares, 1942
- Arthrodes Koch, 1839
- Caelopygus Koch, 1839 – includes Liarthrodes Mello-Leitão, 1922 and Heterarthrodes Mello-Leitão, 1935
- Garatiba Mello-Leitão, 1940
- Metampheres Roewer, 1913
- Metarthrodes Roewer, 1913 – includes Exochobunus Mello-Leitão, 1931, Heterampheres Mello-Leitão, 1935, Varzellinia Mello-Leitão, 1942 and Kapichaba Mello-Leitão, 1942
- Parampheres Roewer, 1913
- Pristocnemis Koch, 1839 – includes Stenoprostygnus Piza, 1940
- Proampheres Roewer, 1913
- Thereza Roewer, 1943
