= Eusarcus =

Scientific classification
- Kingdom: Animalia
- Phylum: Arthropoda
- Subphylum: Chelicerata
- Class: Arachnida
- Order: Opiliones
- Family: Gonyleptidae
- Subfamily: Pachylinae
- Genus: Eusarcus; Perty, 1833

Type species
- Eusarcus armatus Perty, 1833

Genus of harvestmen/daddy longlegs

Eusarcus is a genus of harvestmen found in northeastern Argentina, eastern Paraguay, Uruguay and from northeastern to southern Brazil. One of the oldest genera of the Pachylinae subfamily, the genus contains 34 valid species.
