= João Ramalho (footballer) =

Portuguese footballer

Personal information
- Full name: João Fernando Mendes Ramalho
- Date of birth: 6 January 1954 (age 72)
- Place of birth: Lisbon, Portugal
- Position: Defender

Youth career
- 1969–1972: Benfica

Senior career*
Years	Team	Apps	(Gls)
1972–1974	Beira-Mar	53	(0)
1974–1983	Vitória de Guimarães	222	(3)
1983–1984	Sporting Espinho	9	(0)
1984–1985	Felgueiras	28	(0)
1985–1986	Varzim	19	(0)
- * Club domestic league appearances and goals

João Fernando Mendes Ramalho (born 6 January 1954) is a Portuguese former footballer who played as a defender.

He played 12 seasons and 284 games in the Primeira Liga for Vitória de Guimarães, Beira-Mar and Sporting Espinho.

== Career ==
Ramalho made his Primeira Liga debut for Beira-Mar on 10 September 1972 in a game against Farense.
