= Bourguyiinae =

Scientific classification
- Kingdom: Animalia
- Phylum: Arthropoda
- Subphylum: Chelicerata
- Class: Arachnida
- Order: Opiliones
- Family: Gonyleptidae
- Subfamily: Bourguyiinae; Mello-Leitão, 1923

Subfamily of harvestmen/daddy longlegs

Bourguyiinae is a Neotropical sub-family of harvestmen (order Opiliones) in the family Gonyleptidae

== Genera ==
Bourguyiinae contains the following genera:

- Asarcus Koch, 1839
- Bourguyia Mello-Leitão, 1923
