= Serra do Ramalho, Bahia =

Coordinates: 13°34′19″S 43°35′52″W

Serra do Ramalho
- Municipality
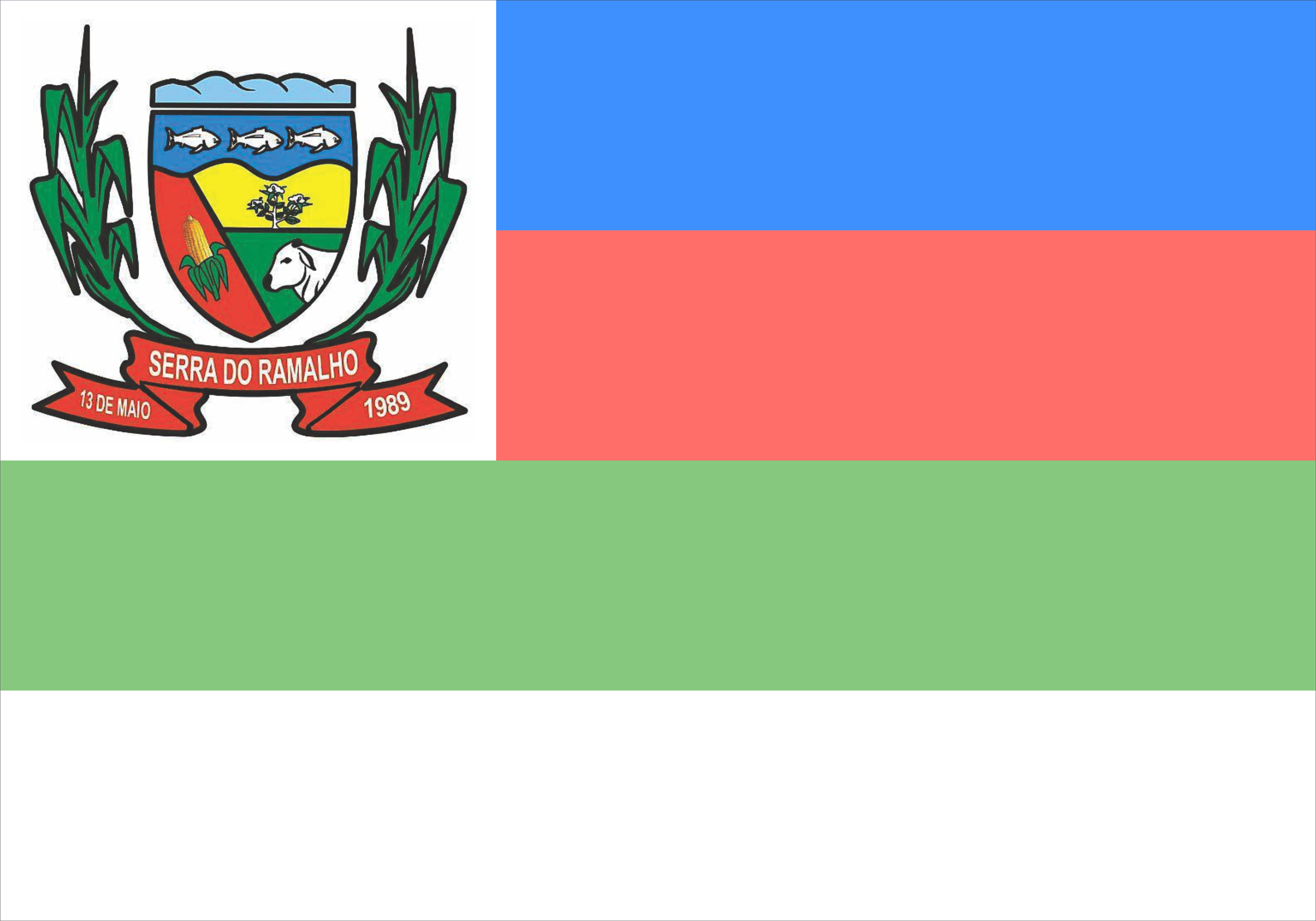
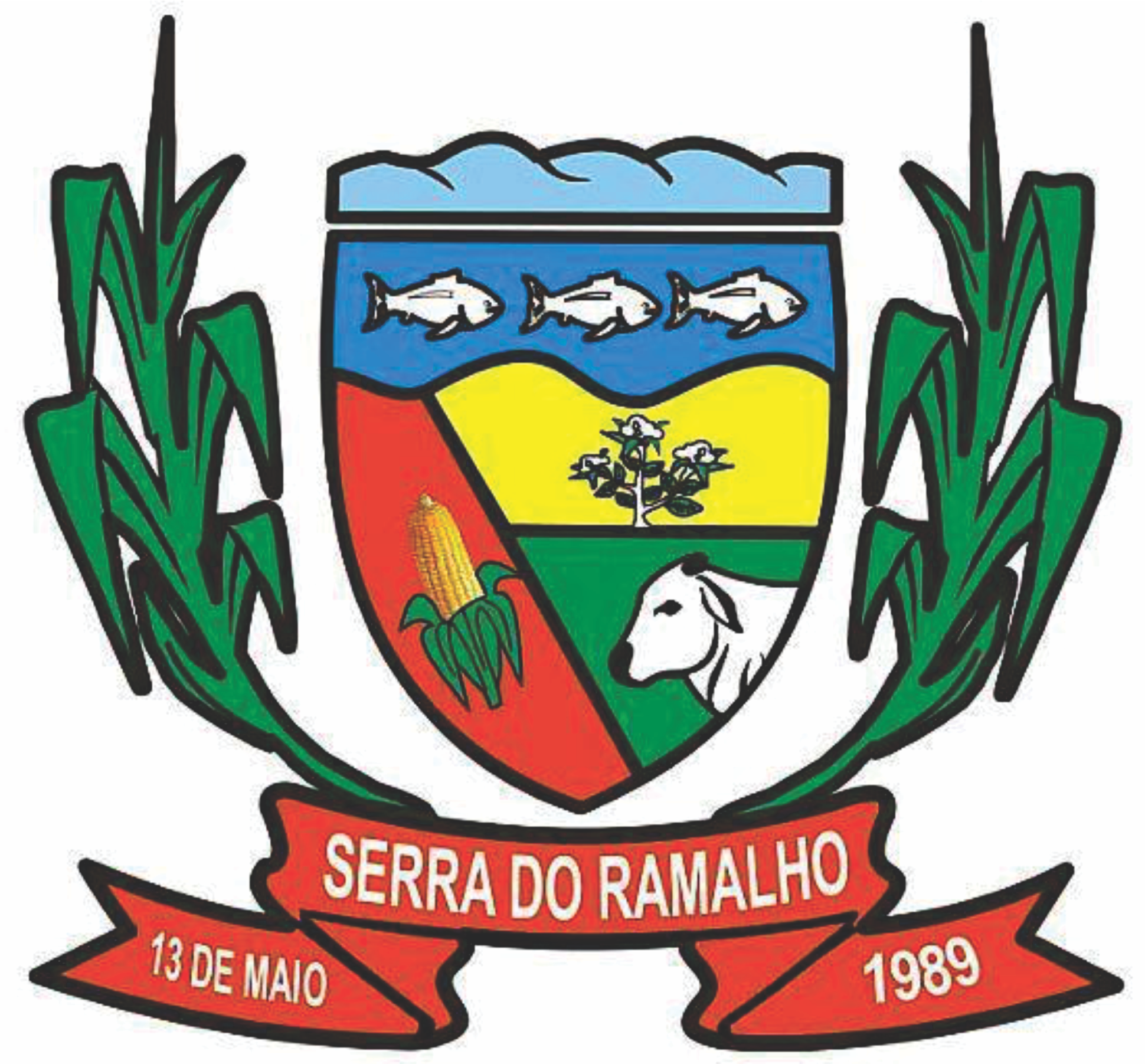
- Flag Coat of arms

- Location of Serra do Ramalho in Bahia

- Location of Serra do Ramalho in Brazil
- Country: Brazil
- Region: Northeast
- State: Bahia

Population (2022)
  - Total: 34,222
- Time zone: UTC−3 (BRT)
- Website: serradoramalho.ba.gov.br

Serra do Ramalho is a municipality in the state of Bahia in the North-East region of Brazil.

== See also ==
- List of municipalities in Bahia
