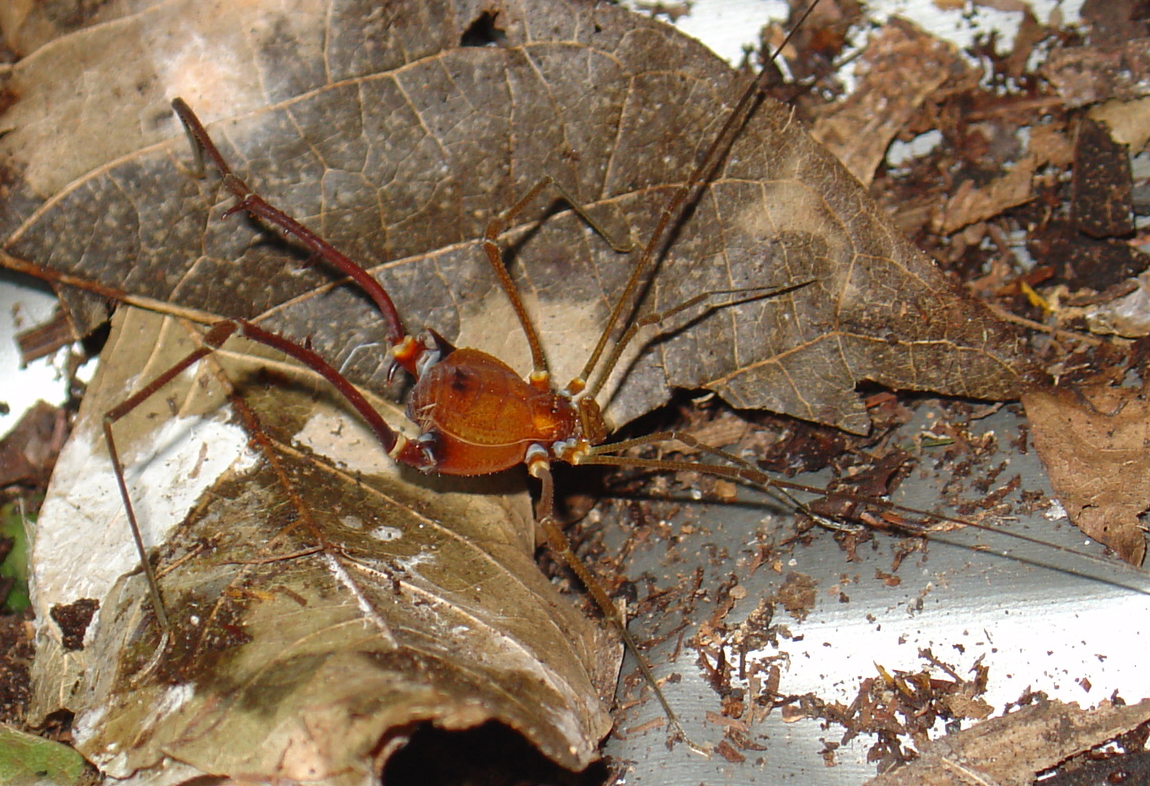
- Metagonyleptes calcar Roewer, 1913, from Brazil

Scientific classification
- Domain: Eukaryota
- Kingdom: Animalia
- Phylum: Arthropoda
- Subphylum: Chelicerata
- Class: Arachnida
- Order: Opiliones
- Superfamily: Gonyleptoidea
- Family: Gonyleptidae; Sundevall, 1833

Subfamilies
- See text

= Gonyleptidae =

Family of harvestmen/daddy longlegs

Gonyleptidae is a neotropical family of harvestmen (order Opiliones) with more than 800 species, the largest in the suborder Laniatores and the second largest of the Opiliones as a whole. The largest known harvestmen are gonyleptids.

Like most harvestmen, gonyleptids are almost exclusively nocturnal, except some Caelopyginae, Goniosomatinae (during reproductive season), Gonyleptinae, Mitobatinae, Pachylinae and Progonyleptoidellinae. Most species inhabit dense tropical, subtropical and temperate (Chile) forests, but some occur in open vegetation as the Pampas, the Cerrado, and the Caatinga. There are some species that live in caves, but only three troglobites are recorded for the family.

== Name ==
The family is named after the type genus Gonyleptes, which is derived from Greek gony, gonatos = joint, knee + leptos, ê, on = thin, fine, delicate.

== Diagnosis ==
Laniatores with coxa IV immensely developed, widely surpassing dorsal scutum in dorsal view in most species. Many species with double ozopore. Pedipalpus with cylindrical segments, strongly spined, tibia and tarsus flattened ventrally. Basal segments of leg IV with strong sexual dimorphism, shown either in spination, curvature or length. Penis with ventral plate well defined, glans may bear ventral and/or dorsal processes.

== Distribution ==
Gonyleptidae have been recorded continuously from the southernmost tip of the South American continent (southern Chile and Argentina), Falklands to Costa Rica, with one isolated species cited from Guatemala.

== Subfamilies ==
Gonyleptidae comprises several subfamilies, around 280 genera and over 700 species (early 2024):

- Bourguyiinae (2 genera; 10 spp.)
- Caelopyginae (9; 29)
- Cobaniinae (1; 2)
- Goniosomatinae (5; 46)
- Gonyassamiinae (2; 3)
- Gonyleptinae (38; 142)
- Hernandariinae (4; 12)
- Heteropachylinae (8; 11)
- Mitobatinae (1; 45)
- Pachylinae (129; 400)
- Pachylospeleinae (1; 1)
- Progonyleptoidellinae (10; 17)
- Roeweriinae
- Sodreaninae (4; 5)
- Tricommatinae (29; 51)

Note: Metasarcinae was formerly included as a subfamily of Gonyleptidae and has since been raised to family level (Metasarcidae).

== Relationships ==
Gonyleptidae is the sister-group of Cosmetidae and both are related to the Stygnidae and Cranaidae (Kury, 1992).
