= List of eurypterid genera =

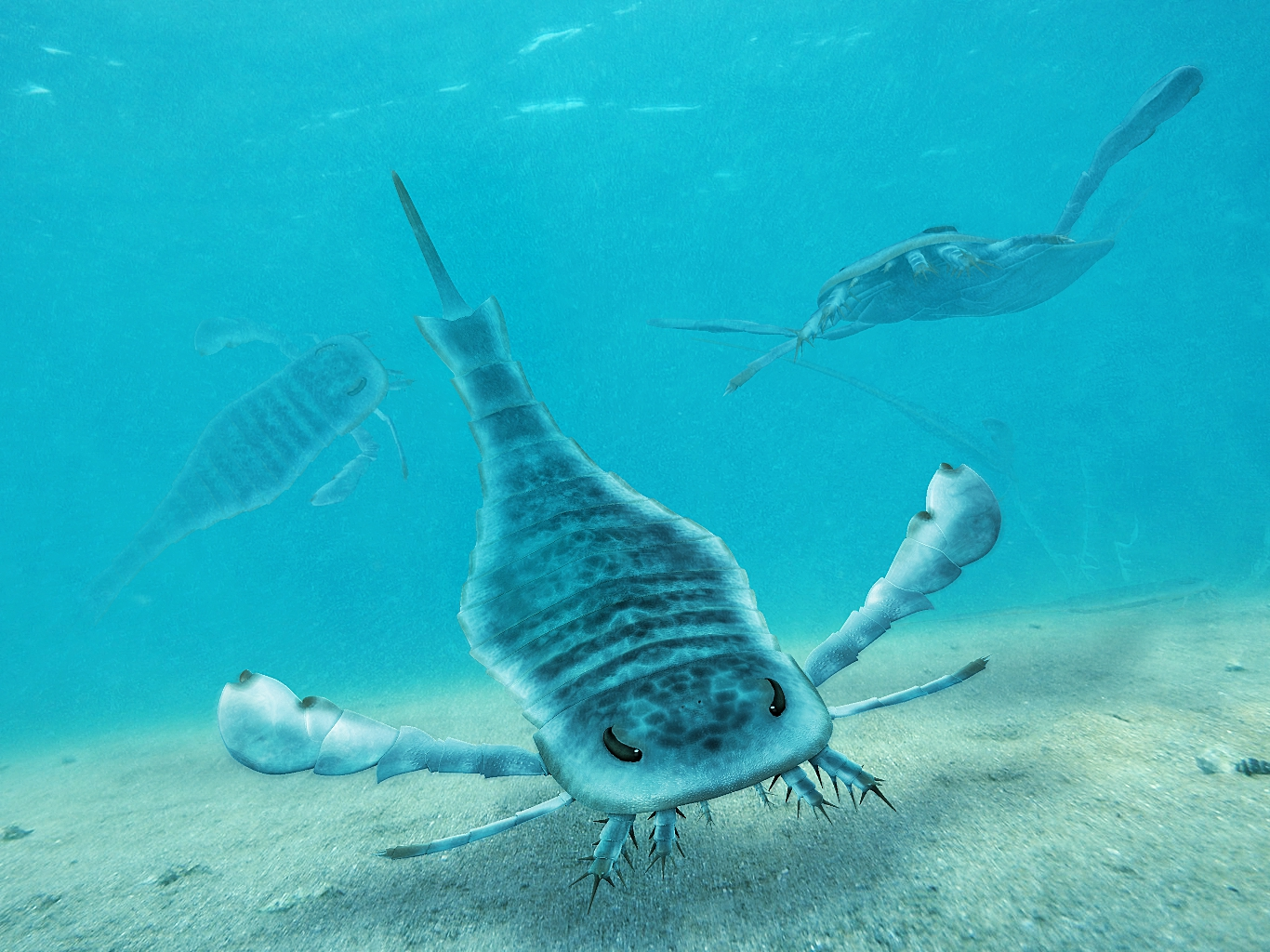
Eurypterus, the most commonly found eurypterid fossil and the first eurypterid genus to be described

This list of eurypterid genera is a comprehensive listing of all genera that have ever been included in the order Eurypterida, excluding purely vernacular terms. The list includes all commonly accepted genera, but also genera that are now considered invalid, doubtful (nomen dubium), or were not formally published (nomen nudum), as well as junior synonyms of more established names and genera that are no longer considered eurypterids. The list currently includes 124 names, out of which 78 are considered valid eurypterid genera.

There are approximately 250 species of eurypterids recognized as valid.

== Naming conventions and terminology ==
There is no "official" or "canonical" list of eurypterid genera. The closest thing is found contained in the regularly updated Summary list of fossil spiders and their relatives in the World Spider Catalog. The vast majority of the content of the list below, including the valid genera, preoccupied names, junior synonyms, taxonomical classifications and sites of discovery, is based upon the 2018 edition of the Summary list. Content not based on the list, such as genera described after its publication, is noted through inline citations.

Naming conventions and terminology follow the International Code of Zoological Nomenclature. Technical terms used include:

- Junior synonym: A name which describes the same taxon as a previously published name. If two or more genera are formally designated and the type specimens are later assigned to the same genus, the first to be published (in chronological order) is the senior synonym, and all other instances are junior synonyms. Senior synonyms are generally used, except by special decision of the ICZN, but junior synonyms cannot be used again, even if deprecated. Junior synonymy is often subjective, unless the genera described were both based on the same type specimen.
- Nomen nudum (Latin for "naked name"): A name that has appeared in print but has not yet been formally published by the standards of the ICZN. Nomina nuda (the plural form) are invalid, and are therefore not italicized as a proper generic name would be. If the name is later formally published, that name is no longer a nomen nudum and will be italicized on this list. Often, the formally published name will differ from any nomina nuda that describe the same specimen.
- Nomen manuscriptum (Latin for "manuscript name"): A name that appears in manuscript of a formal, but not-peer-reviewed, publication that has no scientific backing. A nomen manuscriptum is equivalent to a nomen nudum for everything except the method of publication, and description.
- Nomen oblitum (Latin for "forgotten name"): A name that has not been used in the scientific community for more than fifty years after its original proposal.
- Preoccupied name: A name that is formally published, but which has already been used for another taxon. This second use is invalid (as are all subsequent uses) and the name must be replaced. As preoccupied names are not valid generic names, they will also go unitalicized on this list.
- Nomen dubium (Latin for "dubious name"): A name describing a fossil with no unique diagnostic features.

== Eurypterid genera ==
Valid genus
Status debated
Dubious taxon, synonym, preoccupied name or informal name
Missassigned genus

| Genus | Author(s) | Year | Status | Age | Location | Notes |
|---|---|---|---|---|---|---|
| Acanthoeurypterus | Kjellesvig-Waering | N/A | Jr. synonym | N/A | N/A | Nomen manuscriptum, also considered as a synonym of Eurypterus. |
| Acutiramus | Ruedemann | 1935 | Valid | Silurian - Devonian | Australia; United States; Czech Republic; Canada | |
| Adelophthalmus | Jordan | 1854 | Valid | Devonian - Permian | Nearly cosmopolitan, see article. | |
| Alkenopterus | Størmer | 1974 | Valid | Devonian | Germany | |
| Alloeurypterus | Kjellesvig-Waering | N/A | Jr. synonym | N/A | N/A | Nomen manuscriptum, also considered as a synonym of Eurypterus. |
| Angustidontus | Cooper | 1936 | Misidentification | N/A | N/A | Misidentified, a crustacean. |
| Anthraconectes | Meek & Worthen | 1868 | Jr. synonym | N/A | N/A | Synonym of Adelophthalmus. |
| Athenepterus | Lamsdell | 2025 | Valid | Silurian | England | |
| Baltoeurypterus | Størmer | 1973 | Jr. synonym | N/A | N/A | Synonym of Eurypterus. |
| Barusopterus | Lamsdell | 2025 | Valid | Silurian | United States | |
| Bassipterus | Kjellesvig-Waering & Leutze | 1966 | Valid | Silurian | United States | |
| Belinuropsis | Matthew | 1910 | Nomen dubium | Carboniferous | Canada | Too poorly preserved to be assigned to any particular arthropod group. |
| Bembicosoma | Laurie | 1899 | Misidentification | N/A | N/A | Misidentified, a stem genus on Planaterga. |
| Borchgrevinkium | Novojilov | 1959 | Misidentification | N/A | N/A | Misidentified, possibly a stem prosomapod. |
| Brachyopterella | Kjellesvig-Waering | 1966 | Valid | Silurian | Norway; Scotland | |
| Brachyopterus | Størmer | 1951 | Valid | Ordovician | Wales | |
| Bunodella | Matthew | 1889 | Nomen dubium | Silurian | Canada | Uncertain affinities, probably synonym of Acutiramus. |
| Buffalopterus | Kjellesvig-Waering & Heubusch | 1962 | Valid | Silurian | United States | |
| Campylocephalus | Eichwald | 1860 | Valid | Carboniferous - Permian | Russia; Czech Republic | |
| Campylognathus | Diener | 1924 | Preoccupied | N/A | N/A | Preoccupied by a genus of plant bugs, changed to Campylocephalus. |
| Carcinosoma | Claypole | 1890 | Valid | Silurian | England; Canada; United States; Scotland | |
| Ciurcopterus | Tetlie & Briggs | 2009 | Valid | Silurian | United States | |
| Clarkeipterus | Kjellesvig-Waering | 1966 | Valid | Silurian | United States | |
| Clintonipterus | Kjellesvig-Waering | N/A | Nomen nudum | N/A | N/A | Informal name that only appears in notes in museum drawers. |
| Cruinnopterus | Lamsdell | 2025 | Valid | Silurian | Canada; Scotland; United States | |
| Ctenopterus | Clarke & Ruedemann | 1912 | Valid | Silurian | United States | |
| Curviramus | Ruedemann | 1935 | Jr. synonym | N/A | N/A | Synonym of Pterygotus. |
| Cyrtoctenus | Størmer & Waterston | 1968 | Debated | Devonian - Carboniferous | Belgium; Czech Republic; Scotland; United States | Hibbertopterid taxonomy unresolved, possibly synonym of Hibbertopterus or another genus. |
| Dolichocephala | Claypole | 1883 | Preoccupied | N/A | N/A | Preoccupied by a genus of flies, synonym of Hallipterus. |
| Dolichopterus | Hall | 1859 | Valid | Silurian | United States; Sweden | |
| Dorfopterus | Kjellesvig-Waering | 1955 | Misidentification? | Devonian | United States | Eurypterid affinities questioned. May not be an arthropod at all. |
| Drepanopterus | Laurie | 1892 | Valid | Silurian - Devonian | Scotland; England; Canada | |
| Dunsopterus | Waterston | 1968 | Debated | Carboniferous | Scotland | Hibbertopterid taxonomy unresolved, possibly synonym of Hibbertopterus or another genus. |
| Echinognathus | Walcott | 1882 | Valid | Ordovician | United States | |
| Eocarcinosoma | Caster & Kjellesvig-Waering | 1964 | Valid | Ordovician | United States | |
| Erettopterus | Salter | 1859 | Valid | Silurian - Devonian | Canada; China; England; Estonia; Norway; Scotland; Sweden; United States | |
| Erieopterus | Kjellesvig-Waering | 1958 | Valid | Silurian - Devonian | United States; Canada | |
| Eidothea | Scouler | 1831 | Preoccupied | N/A | N/A | Preoccupied name, changed to Campylocephalus. |
| Eurypterella | Matthew | 1888 | Nomen dubium | Carboniferous | Canada | Too poorly preserved to be assigned to any particular arthropod group. |
| Eurypterus | de Kay | 1825 | Valid | Silurian | Norway; England; United States; Sweden; Estonia | |
| Eurysoma | Claypole | 1890 | Preoccupied | N/A | N/A | Preoccupied name, changed to Carcinosoma. |
| Eusarcana | Strand | 1942 | Valid | Silurian - Devonian | Scotland; Czech Republic; United States | |
| Eusarcus | Grote & Pitt | 1875 | Preoccupied | N/A | N/A | Preoccupied name, changed to Eusarcana. |
| Eysyslopterus | Tetlie & Poschmann | 2008 | Valid | Silurian | Estonia | |
| Glaucodes | Pruvost | 1923 | Jr. synonym | N/A | N/A | Synonym of Mycterops. |
| Glyptoscorpius | Peach | 1882 | Debated | N/A | Scotland | Synonym of Adelophthalmus or a hibbertopterid genus (or synonym). |
| Grossopterus | Størmer | 1934 | Valid | Devonian | Germany; Israel | |
| Hallipterus | Kjellesvig-Waering | 1963 | Valid | Devonian | United States | |
| Hardieopterus | Waterston | 1979 | Valid | Silurian | Scotland | |
| Hastimima | White | 1908 | Valid | Permian | Brazil; South Africa; United States | |
| Herefordopterus | Tetlie | 2006 | Valid | Silurian | England | |
| Hibbertopterus | Kjellesvig-Waering | 1959 | Valid | Carboniferous | Belgium; Czech Republic; Ireland; Scotland; South Africa | |
| Himantopterus | Salter | 1856 | Preoccupied | N/A | N/A | Unavailable junior homonym, replaced by name Erettopterus |
| Holmipterus | Kjellesvig-Waering | 1979 | Valid | Silurian | Sweden | |
| Hughmilleria | Sarle | 1903 | Valid | Silurian | United States; China | |
| Hunanopterus | Lamsdell | 2025 | Valid | Silurian | China; Vietnam | |
| Jaekelopterus | Waterston | 1964 | Valid | Devonian | United States; Germany | |
| Kiaeropterus | Waterston | 1979 | Valid | Silurian | Norway; Scotland | |
| Kockurus | Chlupáč | 1995 | Misidentification | N/A | N/A | Misidentified, likely represents an aglaspidid. |
| Kodymirus | Chlupáč | 1995 | Misidentification | N/A | N/A | Misidentified, likely represents an aglaspidid. |
| Kokomopterus | Kjellesvig-Waering | 1966 | Valid | Silurian | United States | |
| Lanarkopterus | Ritchie | 1968 | Valid | Silurian | Scotland | |
| Lamontopterus | Waterston | 1979 | Valid | Silurian | Scotland | |
| Laurieipterus | Kjellesvig-Waering | 1966 | Valid | Silurian | Scotland | |
| Leiopterella | Lamsdell, Braddy, Loeffler & Dineley | 2010 | Jr. synonym | N/A | N/A | Synonym of Pagea. |
| Lepidoderma | Reuss | 1855 | Jr. synonym | N/A | N/A | Synonym of Adelophthalmus. |
| Malongia | Wang et al. | 2022 | Valid | Devonian | China | |
| Marsupipterus | Caster & Kjellesvig-Waering | 1955 | Misidentification | N/A | N/A | Misidentified, a phyllocarid crustacean. |
| Mazonipterus | Kjellesvig-Waering | 1963 | Misidentification | N/A | N/A | Misidentified, a plant. |
| Megalograptus | Miller | 1874 | Valid | Ordovician | United States | |
| Megarachne | Hünicken | 1980 | Valid | Carboniferous - Permian | Argentina | |
| Melbournopterus | Caster & Kjellesvig-Waering | 1953 | Misidentification | N/A | N/A | Misidentified, a brachipod. |
| Mixopterus | Ruedemann | 1921 | Valid | Silurian | Norway; Estonia; United States | |
| Moselopterus | Størmer | 1974 | Valid | Devonian | Germany; Latvia | |
| Mycterops | Cope | 1886 | Valid | Carboniferous | Scotland; Belgium; United States | |
| Nanahughmilleria | Kjellesvig-Waering | 1961 | Valid | Silurian - Devonian | Norway; Russia; Scotland; United States | |
| Necrogammarus | Woodward | 1870 | Nomen dubium | Silurian | England | Possibly a synonym of Erettopterus. |
| Onychopterella | Størmer | 1951 | Valid | Ordovician - Silurian | South Africa; United States | |
| Onychopterus | Miller & Gurley | 1896 | Preoccupied | N/A | N/A | Preoccupied name, changed to Onychopterella. |
| Orcanopterus | Stott, Tetlie, Braddy, Nowlan, Glasser & Devereux | 2005 | Valid | Ordovician | Canada | |
| Pagea | Waterston | 1962 | Valid | Devonian | Canada | |
| Paracarcinosoma | Caster & Kjellesvig-Waering | 1964 | Jr. synonym | N/A | N/A | Synonym of Eusarcana. |
| Paraeurypterus | Lamsdell, Hoşgör & Selden | 2013 | Valid | Ordovician | Turkey | |
| Parahughmilleria | Kjellesvig-Waering | 1961 | Valid | Silurian - Devonian | Canada; England; Germany; Luxembourg; Russia; Scotland; United States | |
| Parastylonurus | Kjellesvig-Waering | 1966 | Valid | Silurian | Scotland; England | |
| Parka | Fleming | 1831 | Misidentification | N/A | N/A | Misidentified, a plant. |
| Pentecopterus | Lamsdell et al. | 2015 | Valid | Ordovician | United States | |
| Pentlandopterus | Lamsdell, Hoşgör & Selden | 2013 | Valid | Ordovician | Scotland | |
| Pittsfordipterus | Kjellesvig-Waering & Leutze | 1966 | Valid | Silurian | United States | |
| Polystomurum | Novojilov | 1958 | Misidentification | N/A | N/A | Misidentified, an unplaced euchelicerate. |
| Polyzosternites | Goldenberg | 1873 | Jr. synonym | N/A | N/A | Synonym of Adelophthalmus. |
| Pterygotus | Agassiz | 1839 | Valid | Silurian - Devonian | Nearly cosmopolitan, see article. | |
| Qujingopterus | Ma et al. | 2025 | Valid | Devonian | China | Possibly a synonym of Soligorskopterus. |
| Rhenopterus | Størmer | 1936 | Valid | Devonian | Germany | |
| Rhinocarcinosoma | Novojilov | 1962 | Valid | Silurian | United States; Vietnam | |
| Ruedemannipterus | Kjellesvig-Waering | 1966 | Valid | Silurian | United States | |
| Salteropterus | Kjellesvig-Waering | 1951 | Valid | Silurian | England | |
| Selkiepterella | Lamsdell | 2025 | Valid | Silurian | England; Scotland | |
| Sidneyia | Walcott | 1911 | Misidentification | N/A | N/A | Misidentified, an arachnomorph. |
| Slimonia | Page | 1856 | Valid | Silurian | England; Scotland; Bolivia | |
| Soligorskopterus | Plax, Lamsdell, Vrazo & Barbikov | 2018 | Valid | Devonian | Belarus | |
| Stoermeropterus | Lamsdell | 2011 | Valid | Devonian | Norway; Scotland; United States | |
| Strabops | Beecher | 1901 | Misidentification | N/A | N/A | Misidentified, a strabopid. |
| Strobilopterus | Ruedemann | 1935 | Valid | Silurian - Devonian | Estonia; United States | |
| Stylonurella | Kjellesvig-Waering | 1966 | Valid | Silurian - Devonian | Scotland; United States | |
| Stylonuroides | Kjellesvig-Waering | 1966 | Valid | Silurian | Norway | |
| Stylonurus | Page | 1856 | Valid | Devonian | Scotland; United States | |
| Syntomopterella | Tellie | 2007 | Jr. synonym | N/A | N/A | Synonym of Strobilopterus. |
| Syntomopterus | Kjellesvig-Waering | 1961 | Preoccupied | N/A | N/A | Preoccupied name, changed to Strobilopterus. |
| Tarsopterella | Størmer | 1951 | Valid | Devonian | Scotland | |
| Tarsopterus | Clarke & Ruedemann | 1912 | Preoccupied | N/A | N/A | Preoccupied name, changed to Tarsopterella. |
| Terropterus | Wang, Dunlop, Gai, Lei, Jarzembowski & Wang | 2021 | Valid | Silurian | China | |
| Tigrisopterus | Wang, Sun & Zhang | 2025 | Valid | Devonian | China | |
| Truncatiramus | Kjellesvig-Waering | 1961 | Jr. synonym | N/A | N/A | Synonym of Erettopterus. |
| Tylopterella | Størmer | 1951 | Valid | Silurian | Canada | |
| Tylopterus | Clarke & Ruedemann | 1912 | Preoccupied | N/A | N/A | Preoccupied name, changed to Tylopterella. |
| Unionopterus | Chernyshev | 1948 | Valid | Carboniferous | Kazakhstan | |
| Vinetopterus | Poschmann & Tellie | 2004 | Valid | Devonian | Germany | |
| Vernonopterus | Waterston | 1968 | Debated | Carboniferous | Scotland | Hibbertopterid taxonomy unresolved, possibly synonym of Hibbertopterus or another genus. |
| Waeringopterus | Leutze | 1961 | Valid | Silurian | United States | |
| Waterstonopterus | Lamsdell | 2025 | Valid | Silurian | Scotland; United States | |
| Wiedopterus | Poschmann | 2015 | Valid | Devonian | Germany | |
| Willwerathia | Størmer | 1936 | Misidentification | N/A | N/A | Misidentified, a xiphosuran. |
| Woodwardopterus | Kjellesvig-Waering | 1959 | Valid | Carboniferous | Scotland | |

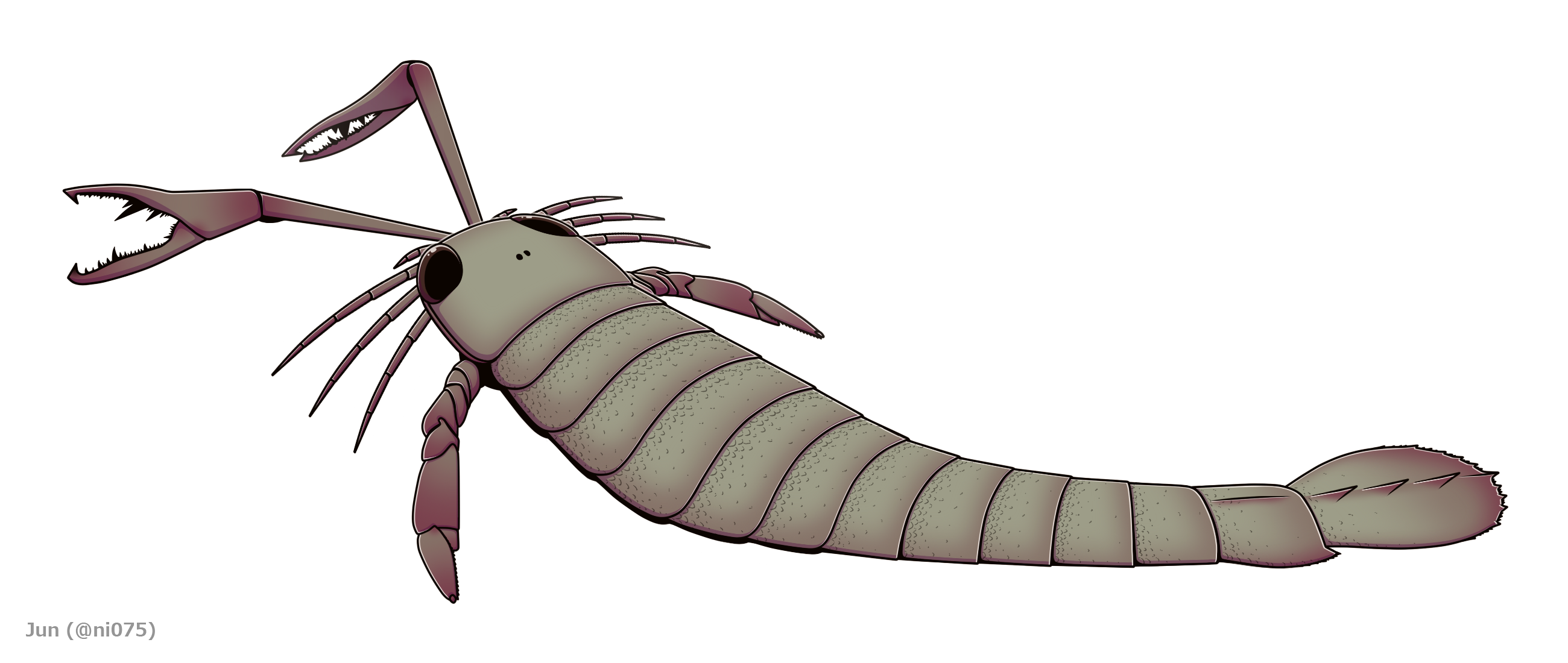
Acutiramus.

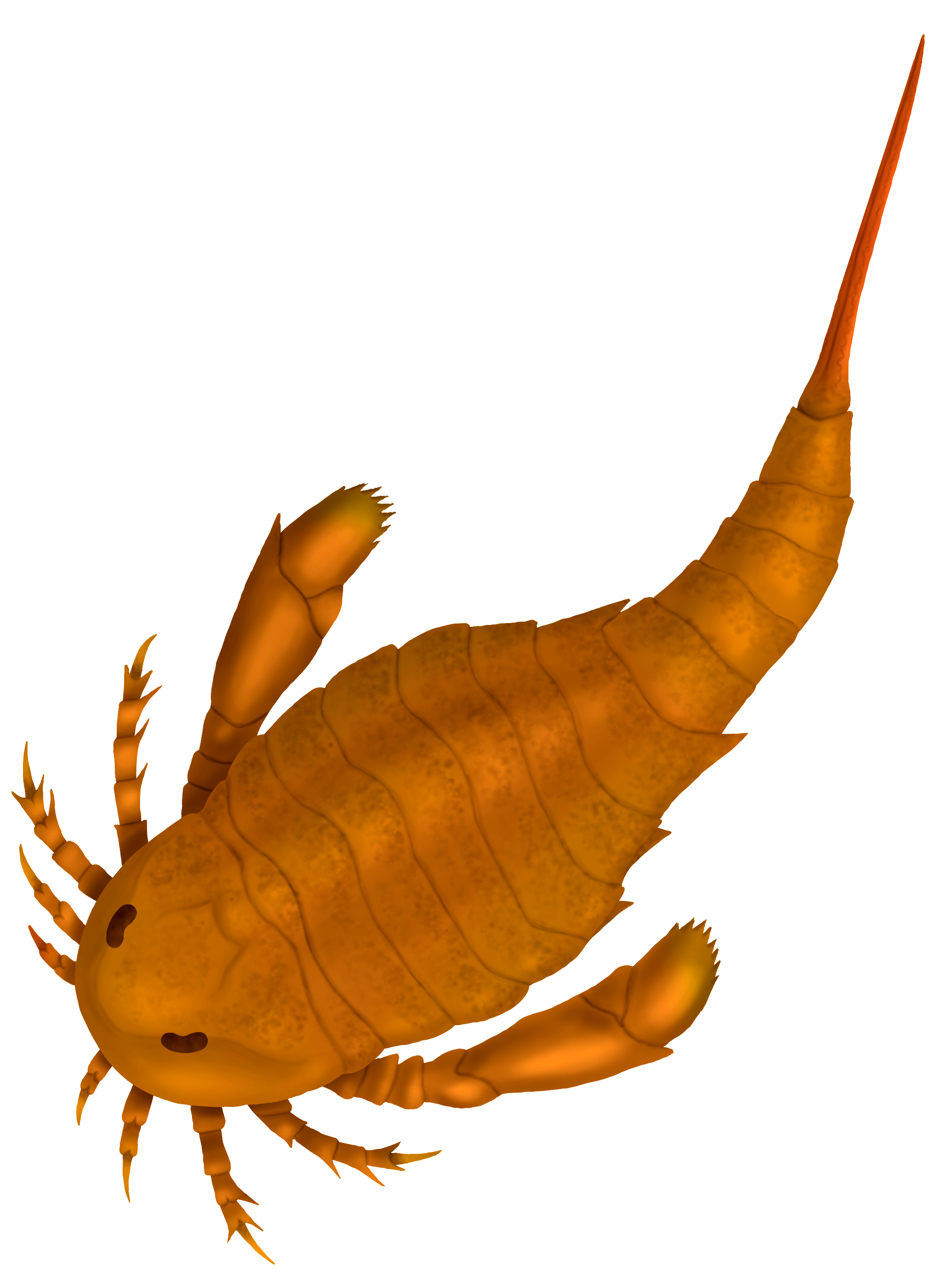
Adelophthalmus.

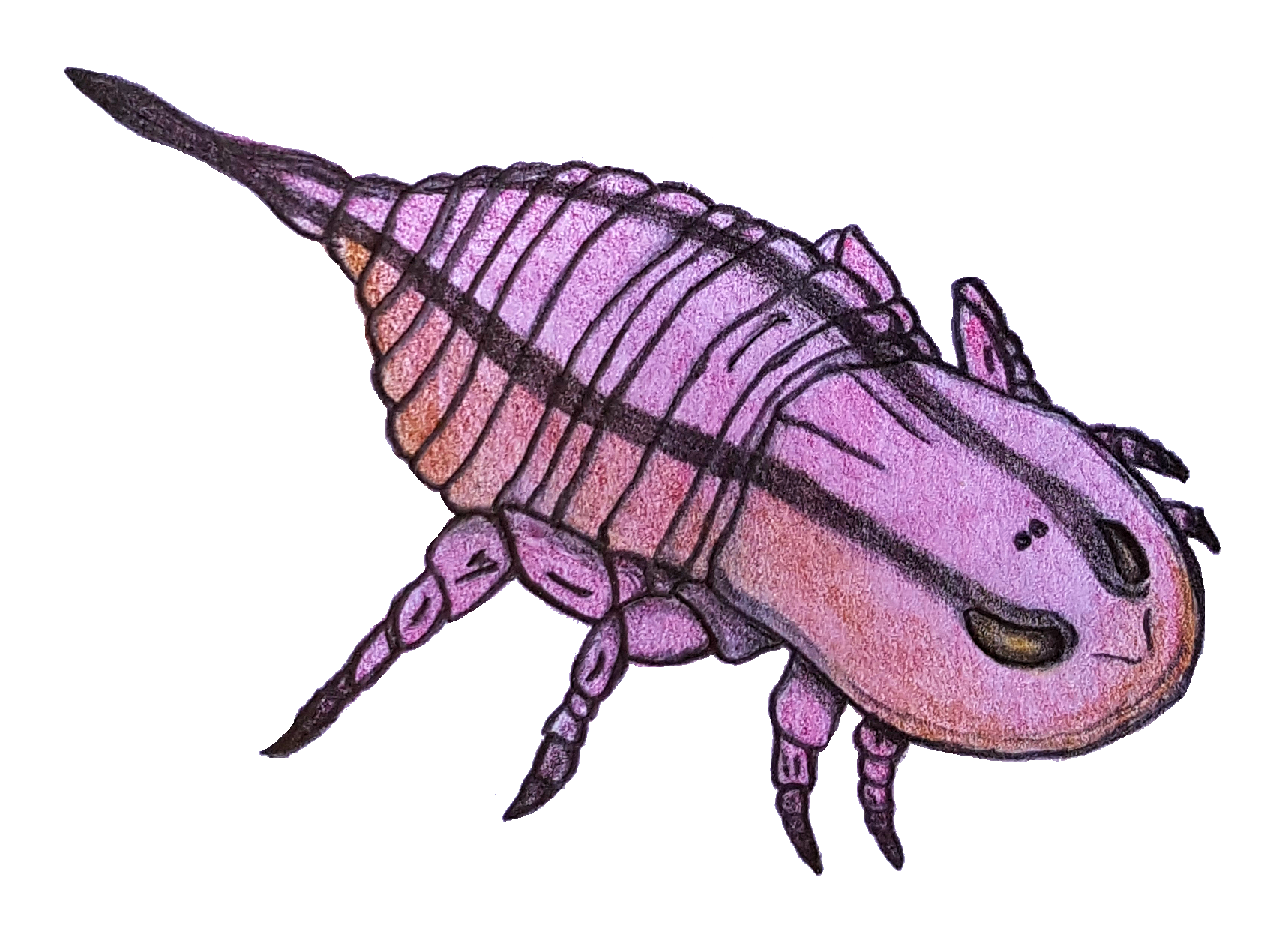
Brachyopterus.

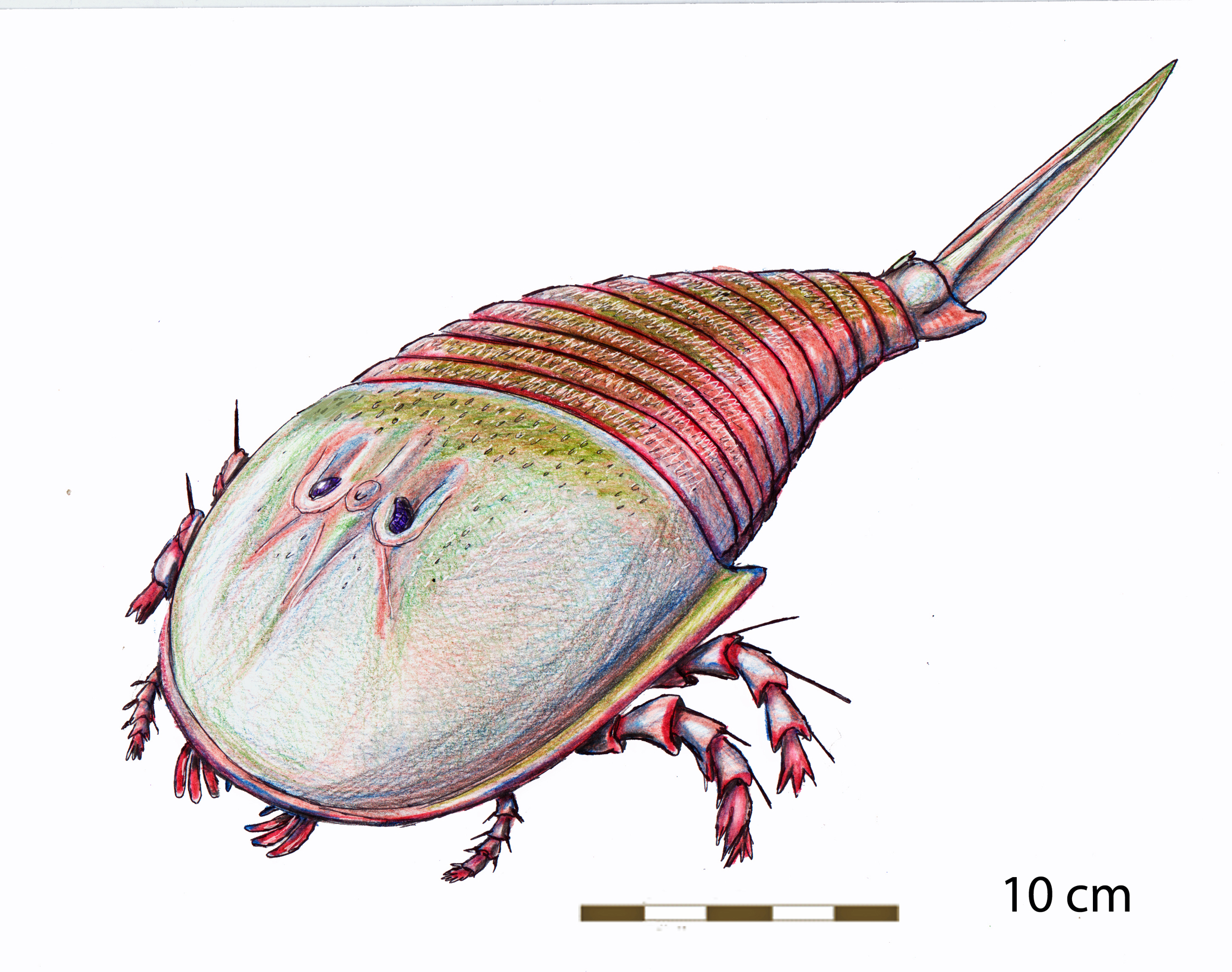
Campylocephalus.

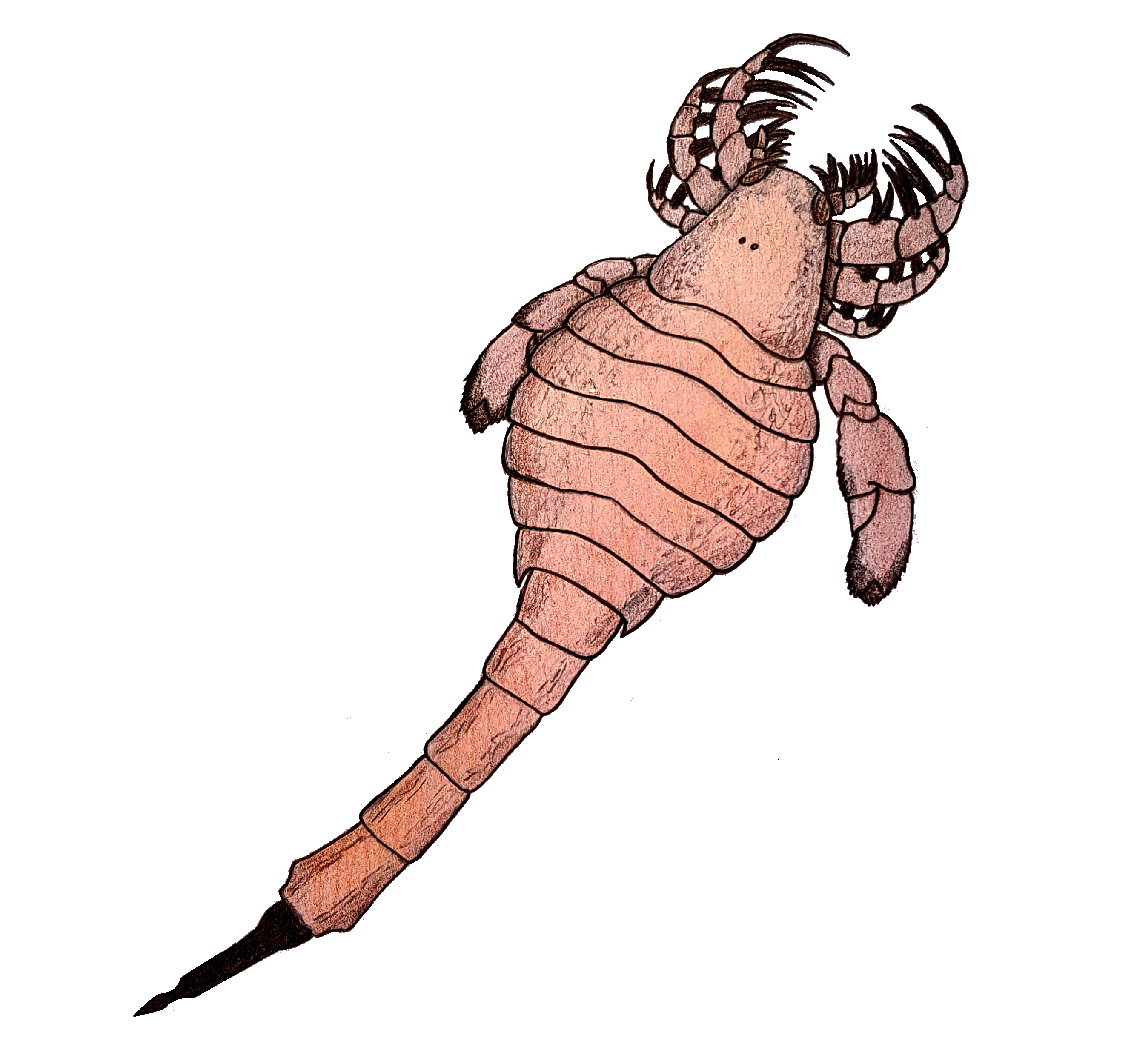
Carcinosoma.

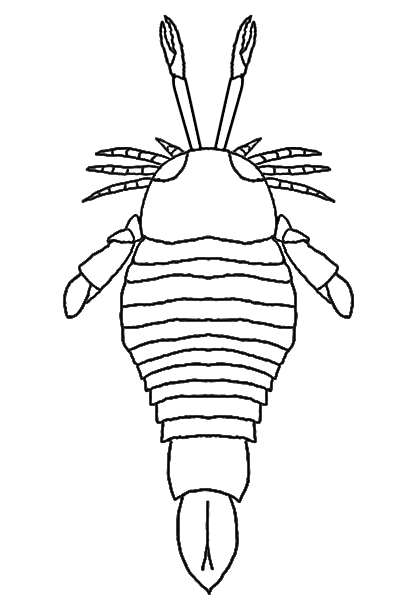
Ciurcopterus.

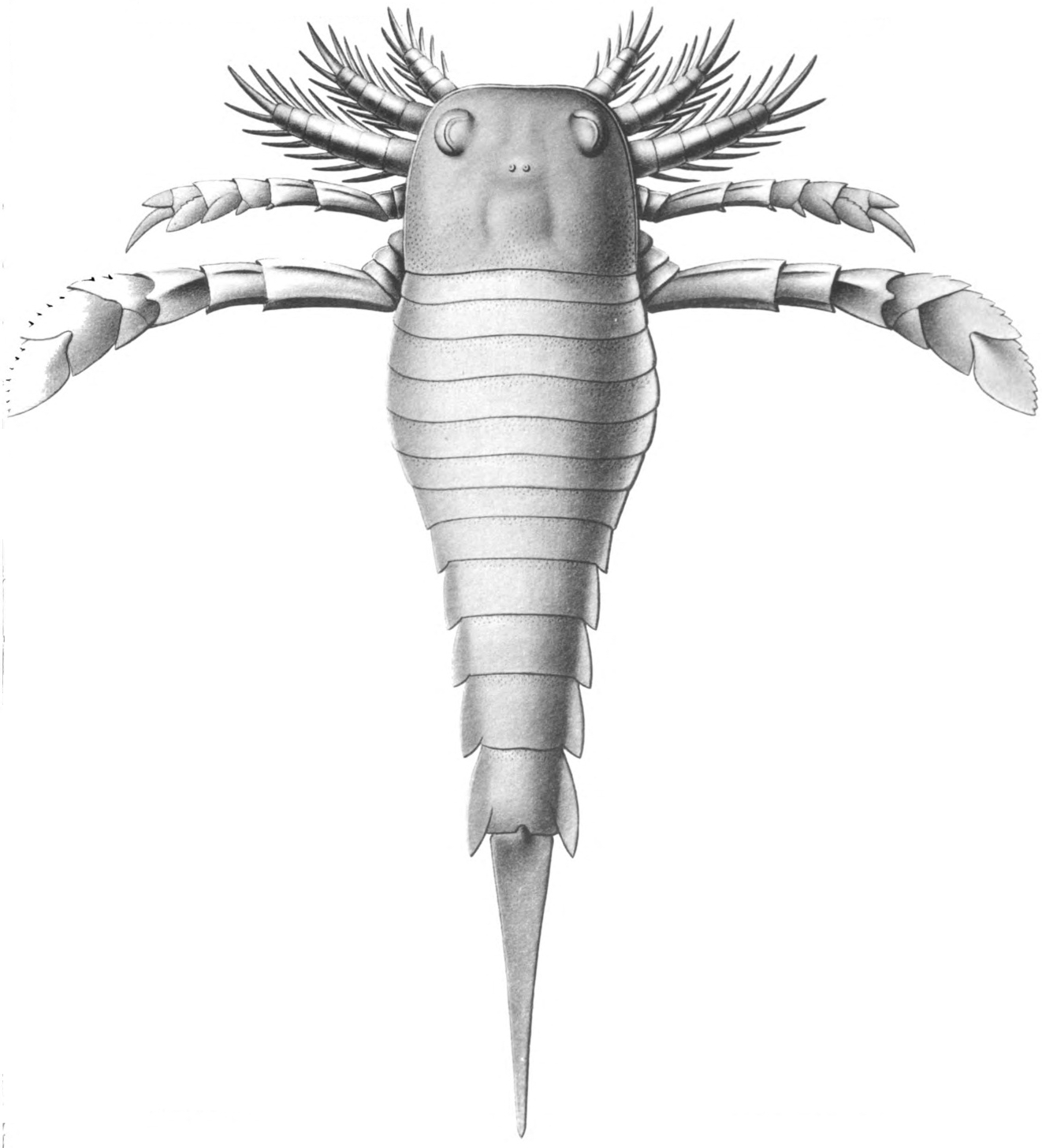
Dolichopterus.

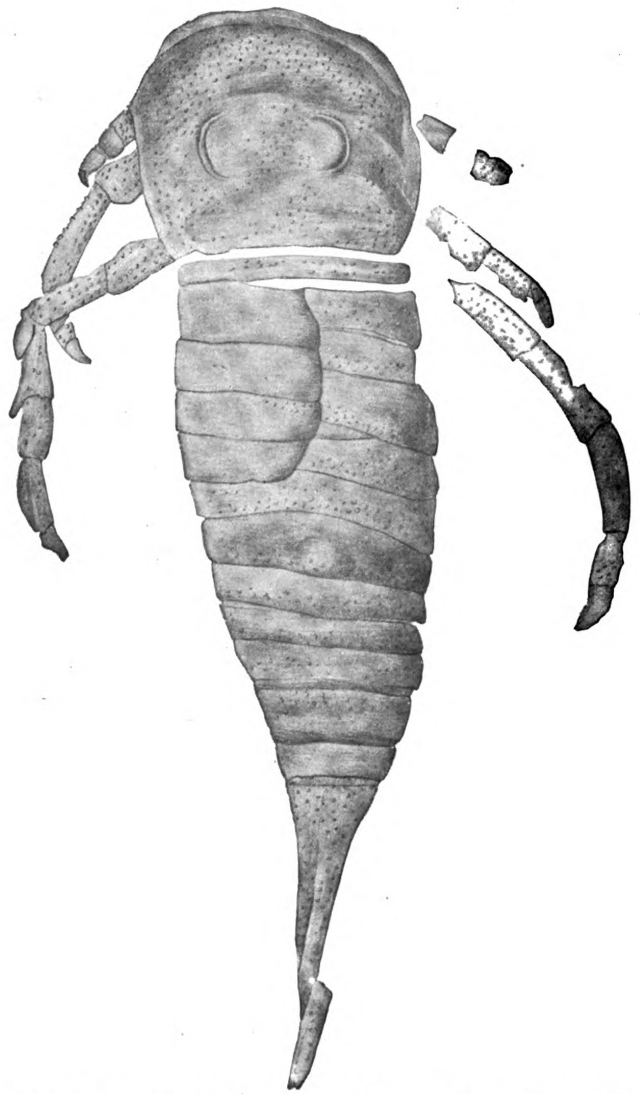
Drepanopterus.

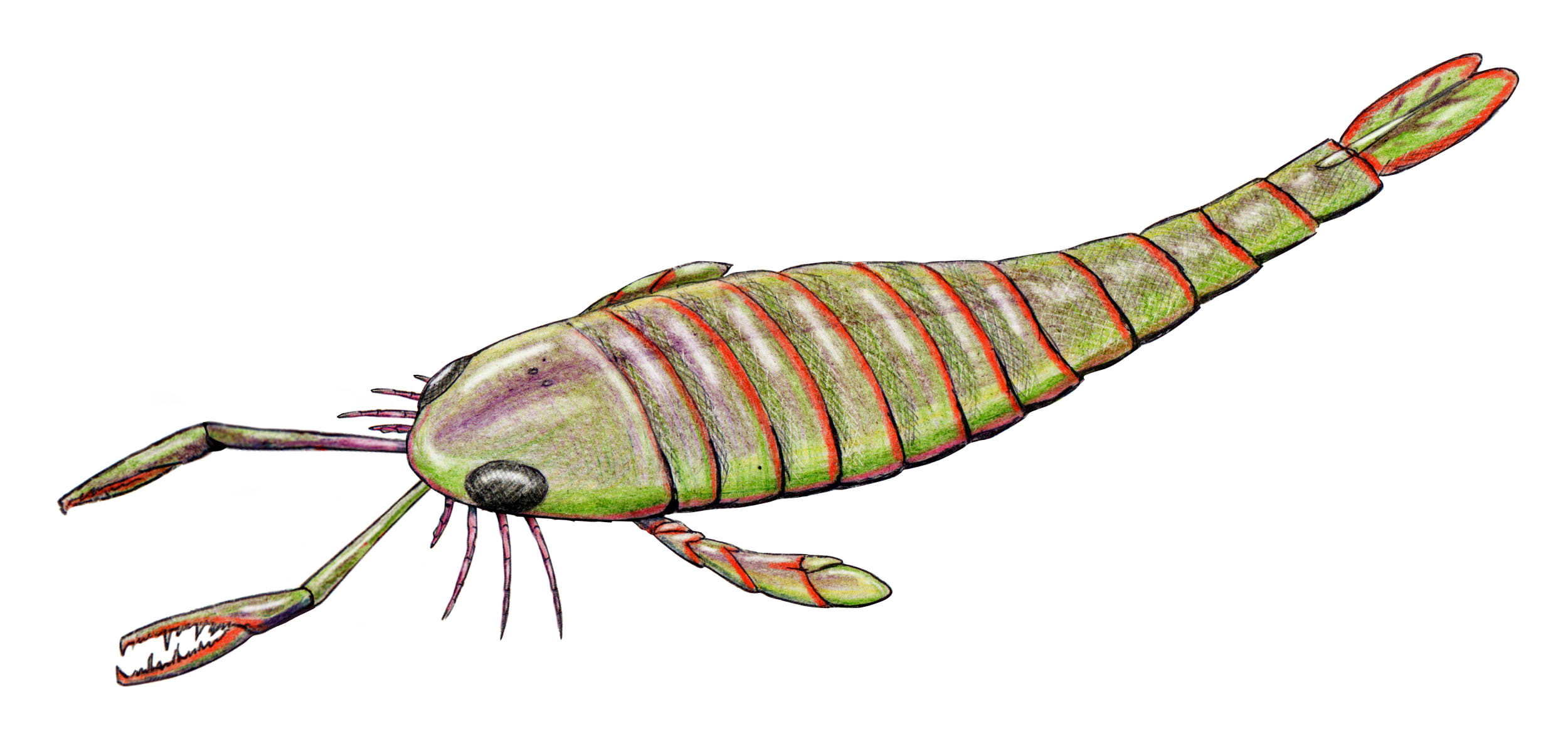
Erettopterus.

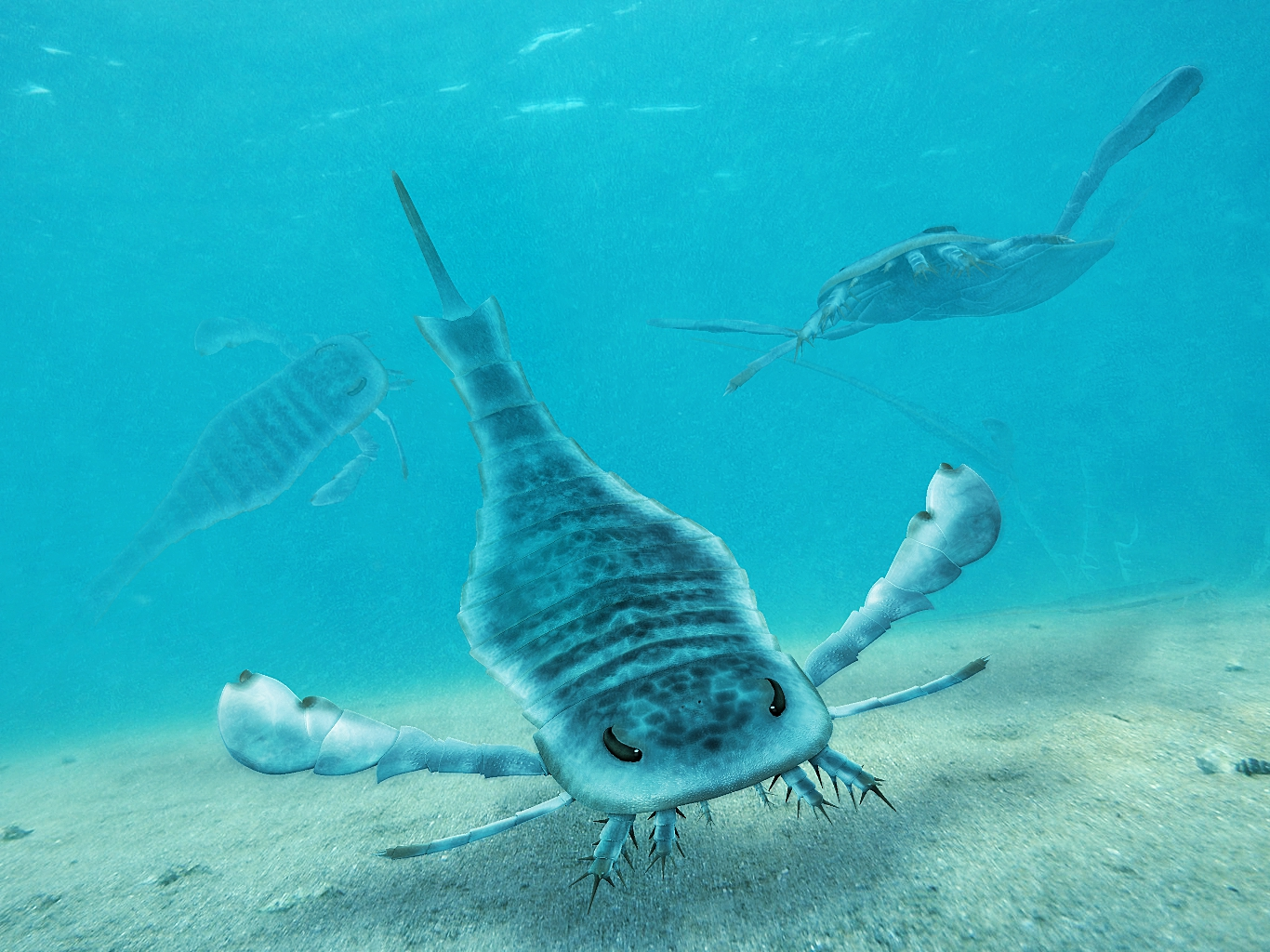
Eurypterus.

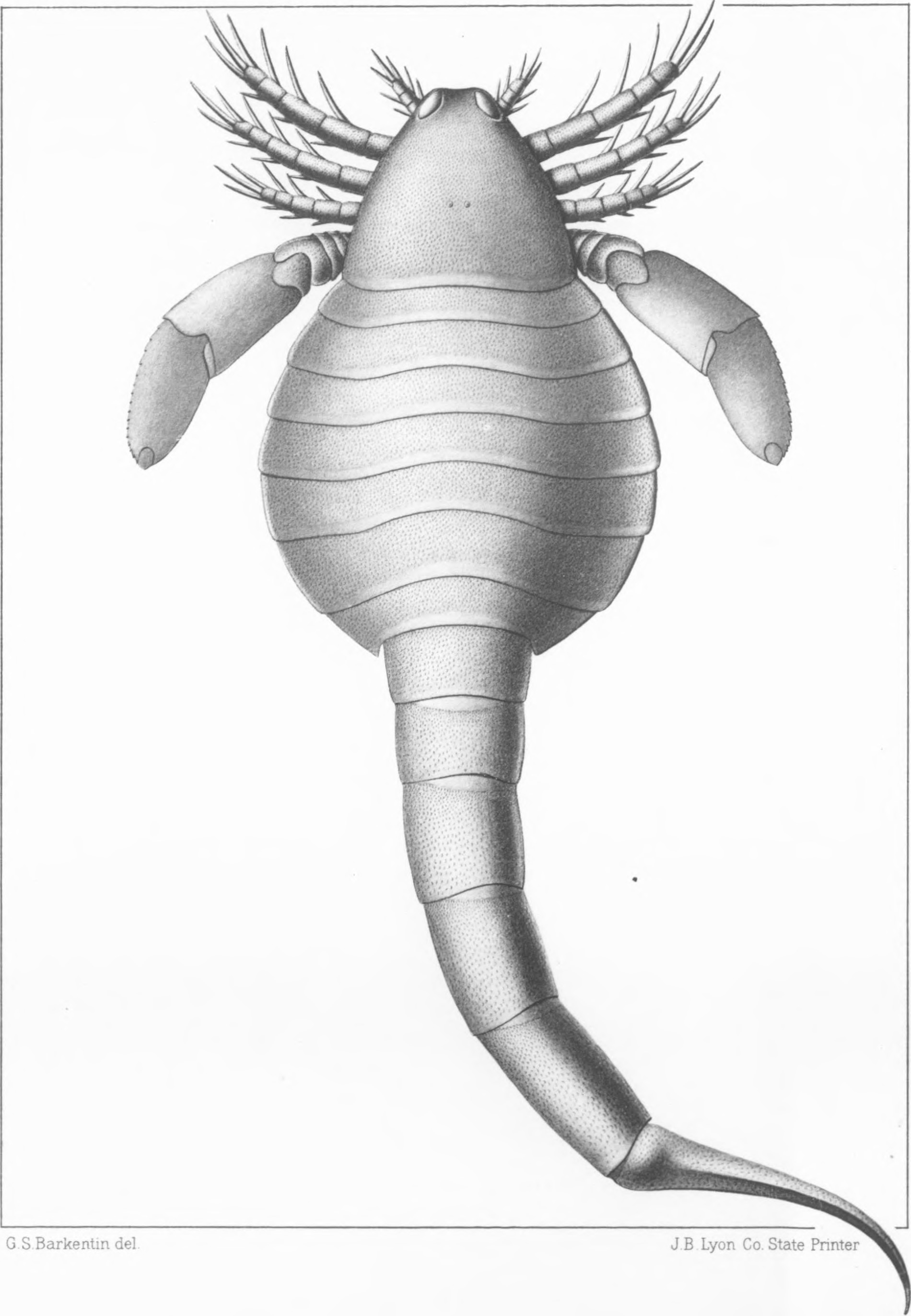
Eusarcana.

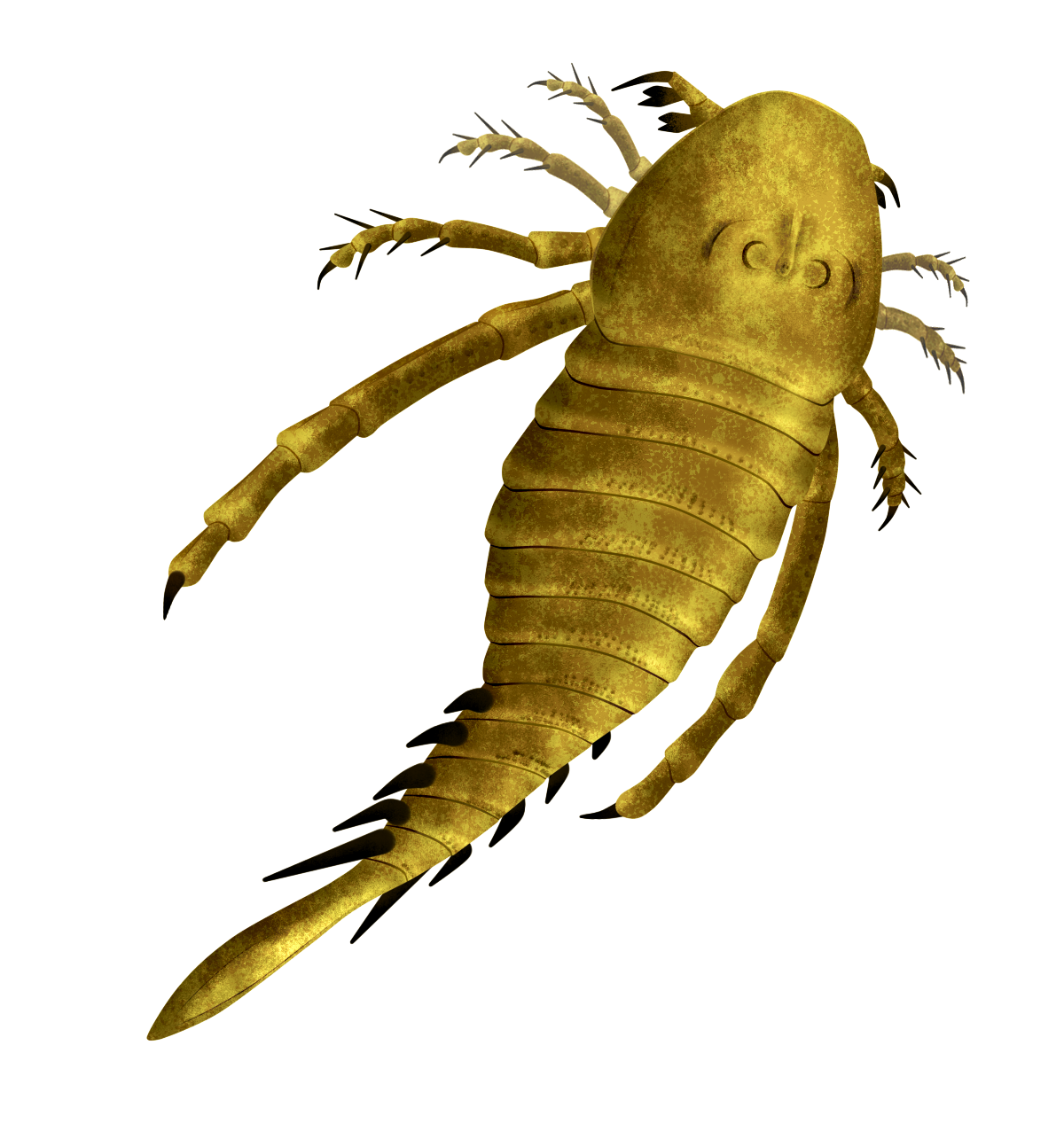
Hallipterus.

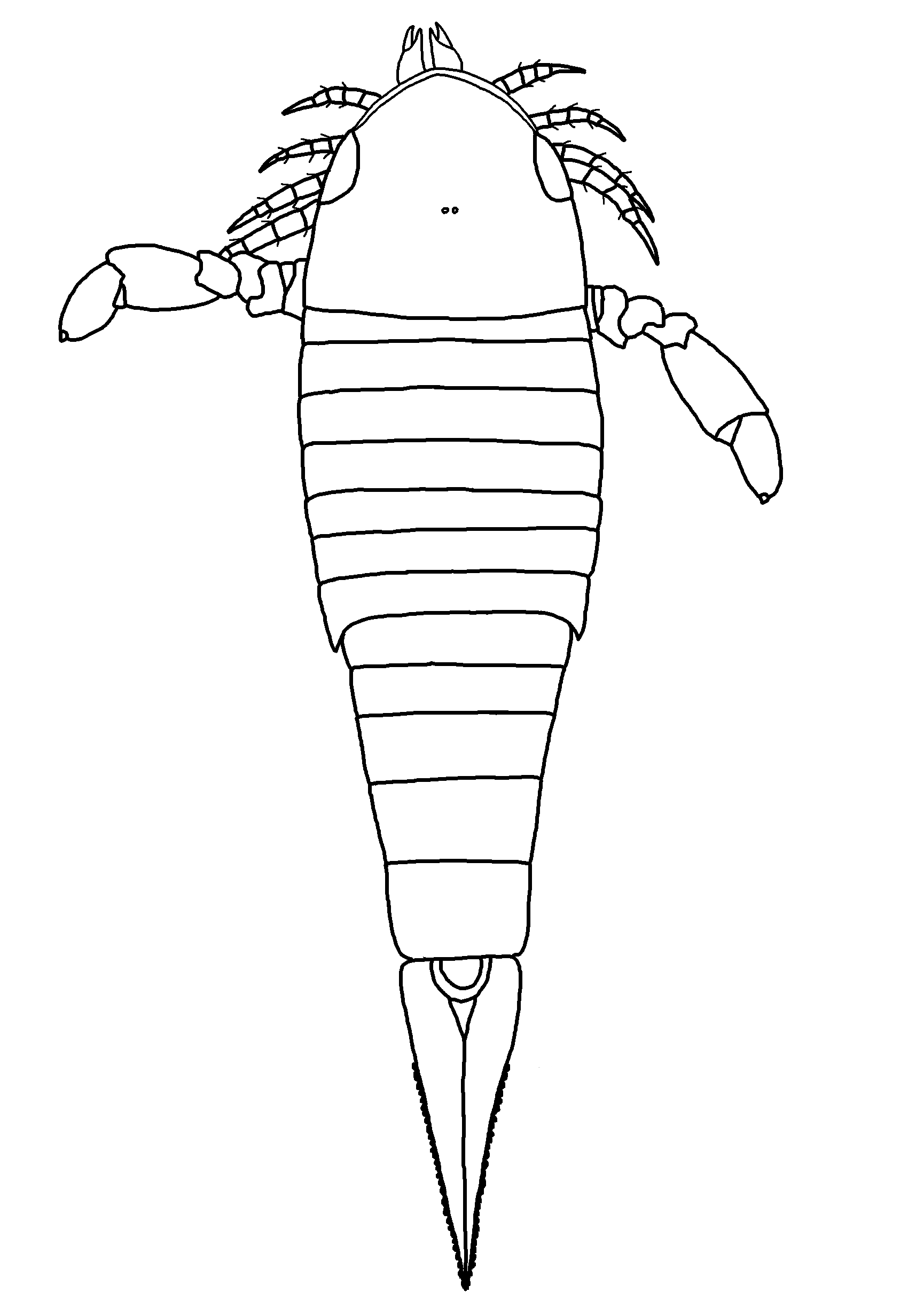
Herefordopterus.

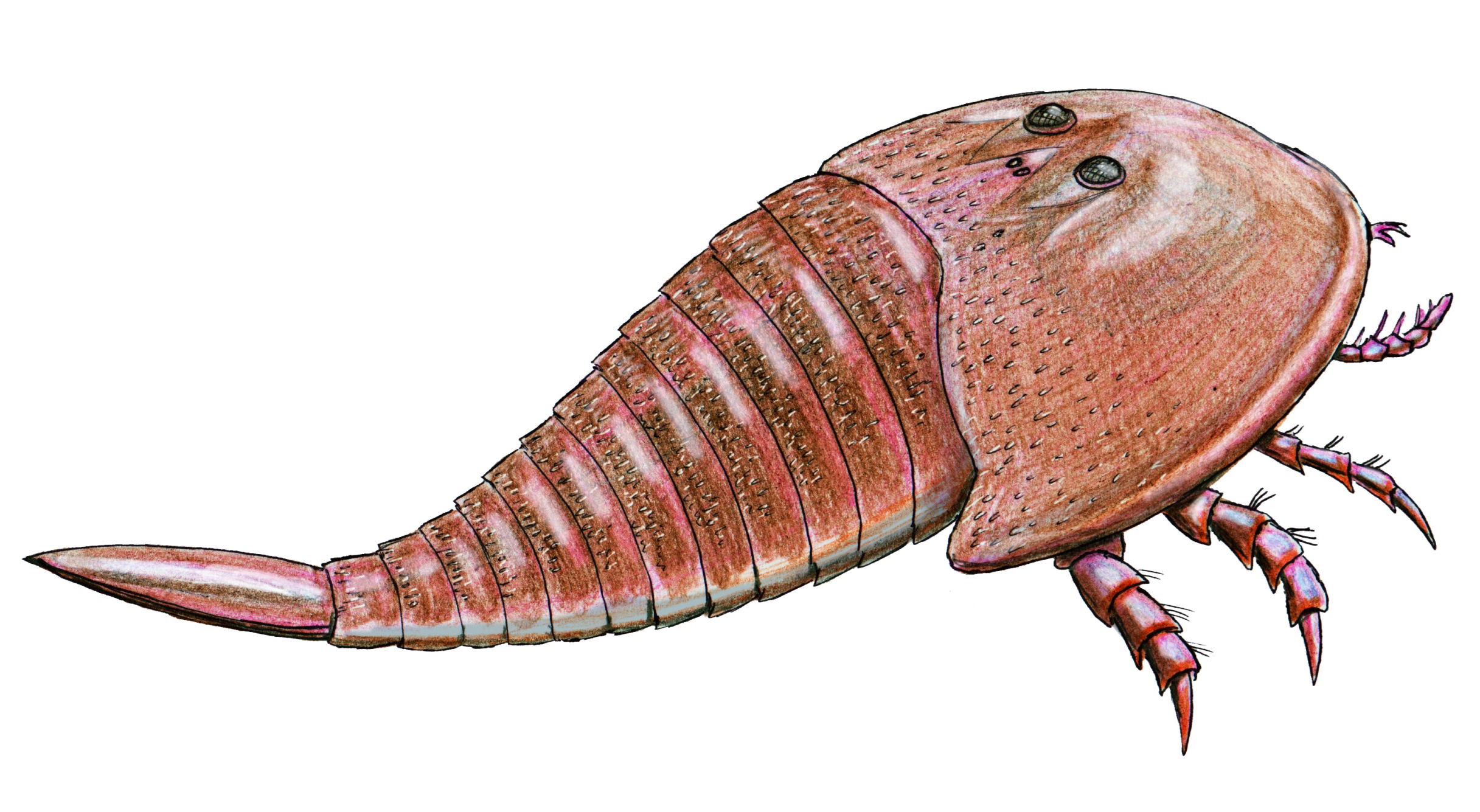
Hibbertopterus.

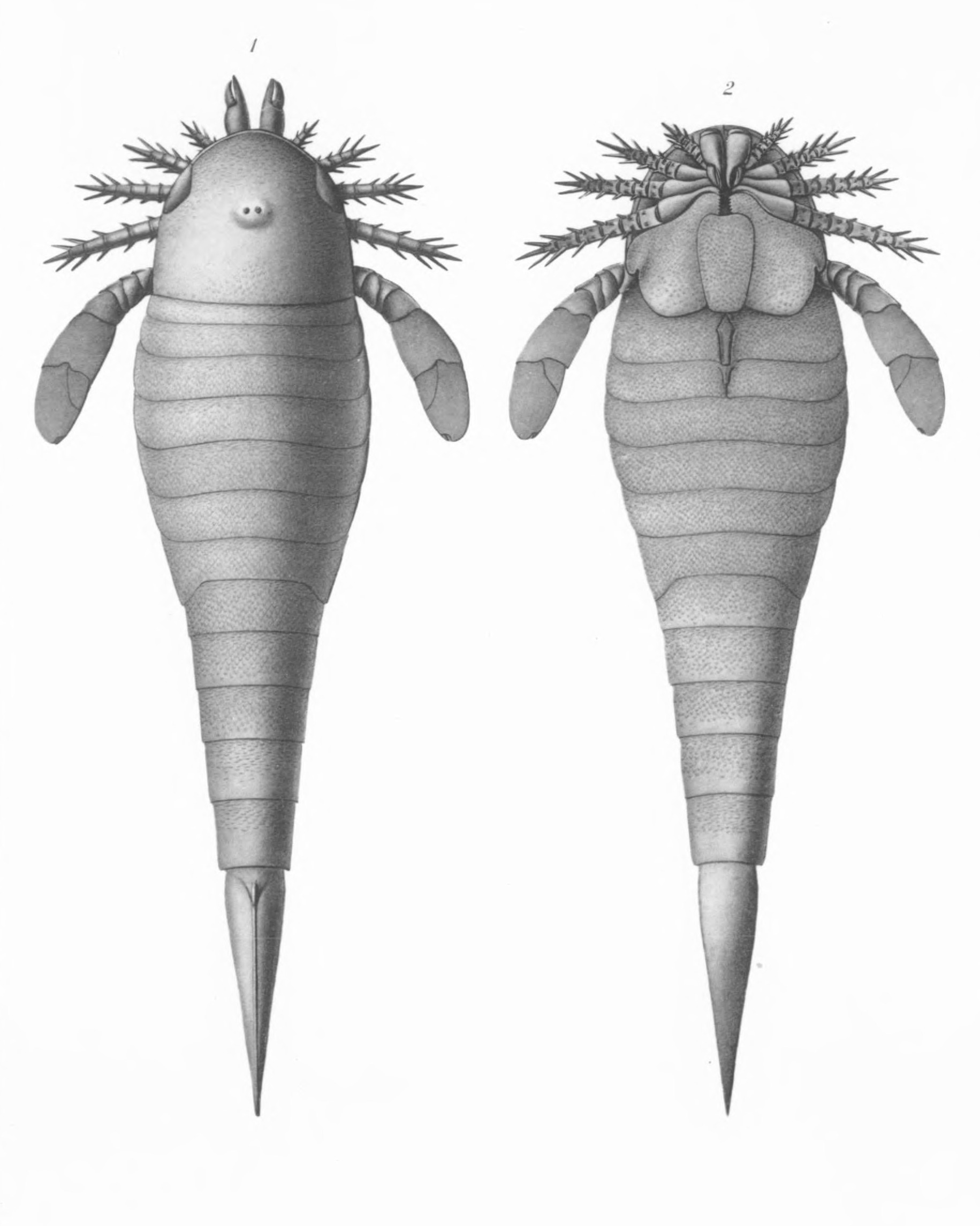
Hughmilleria.

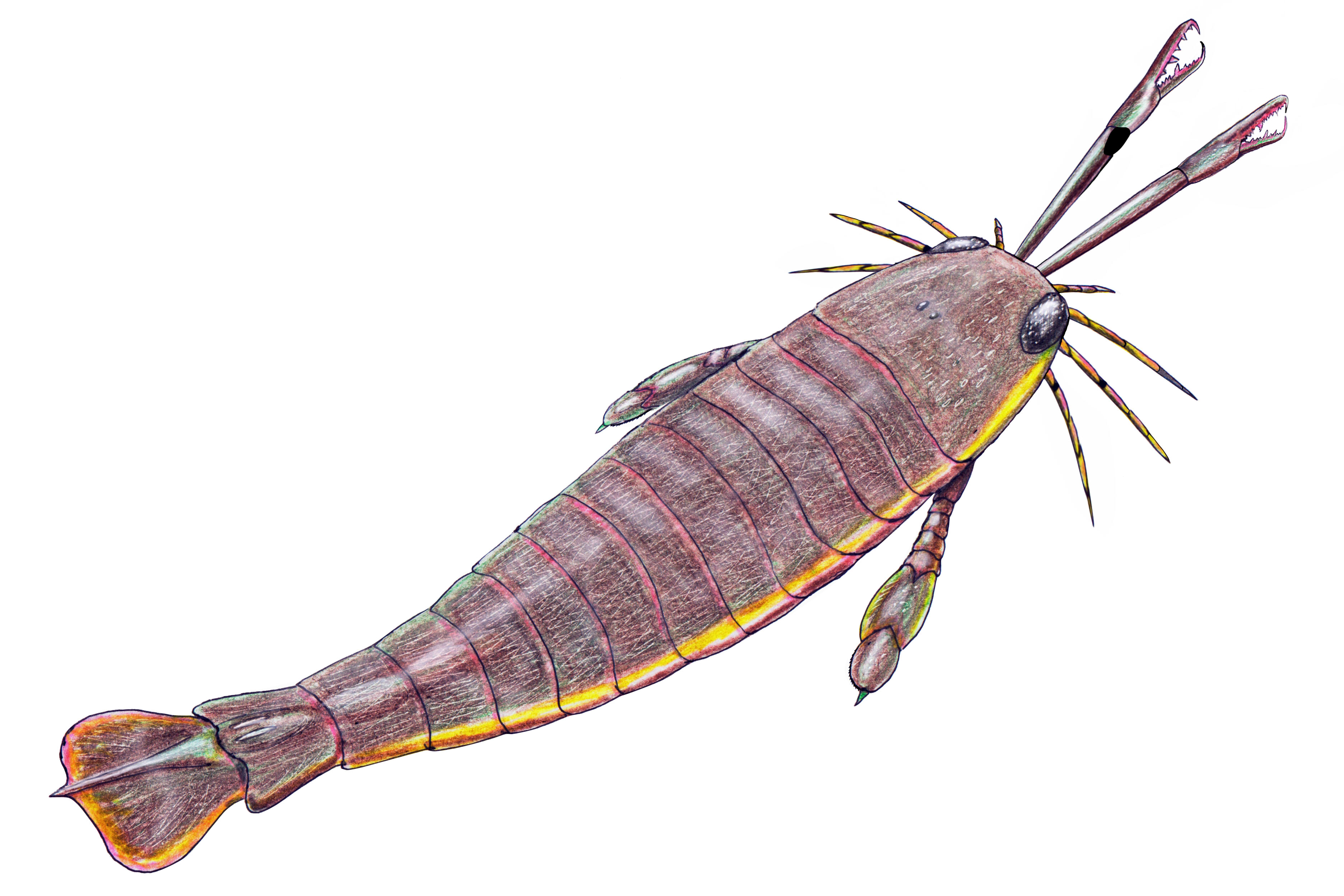
Jaekelopterus.

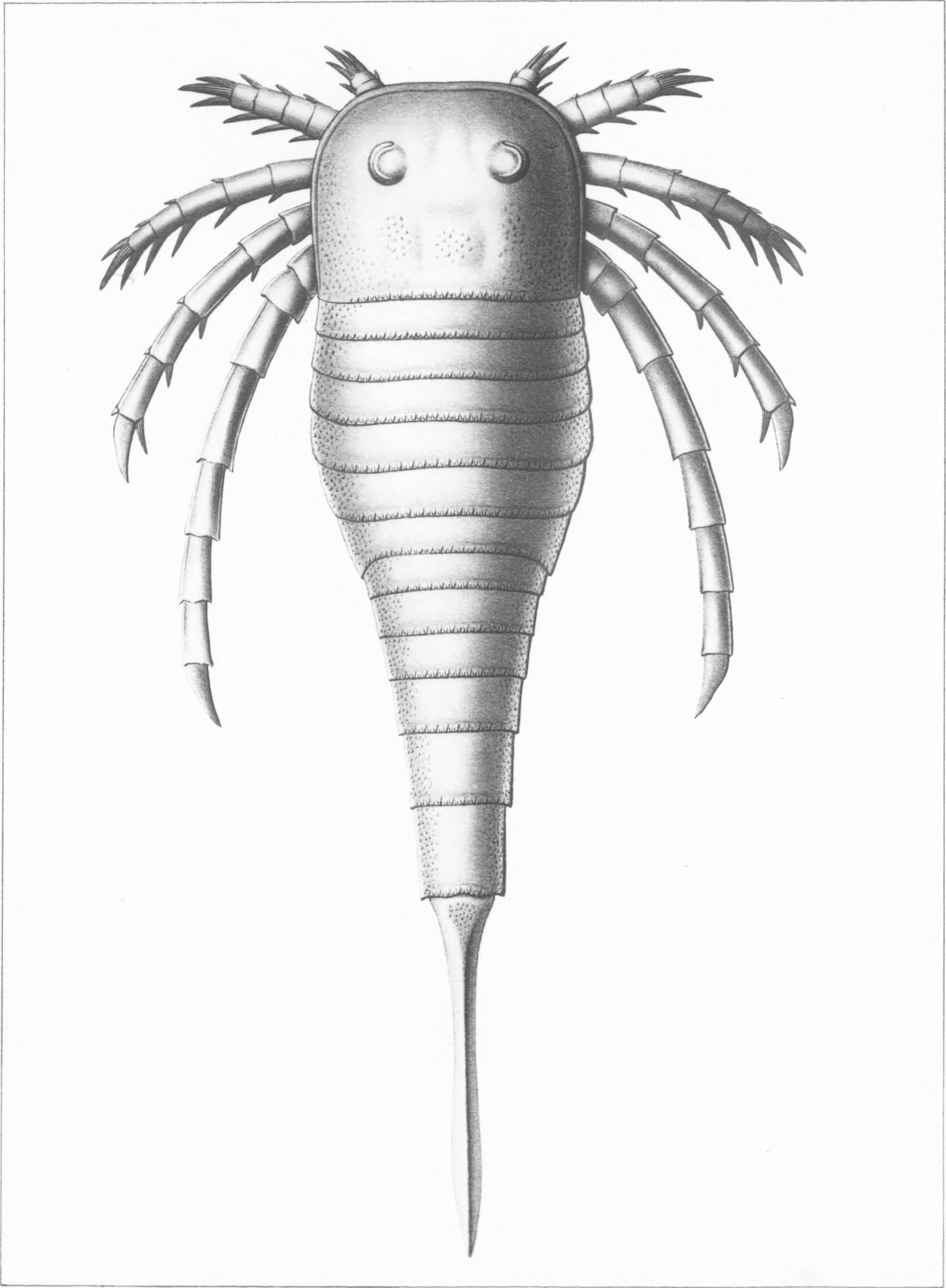
Kokomopterus.

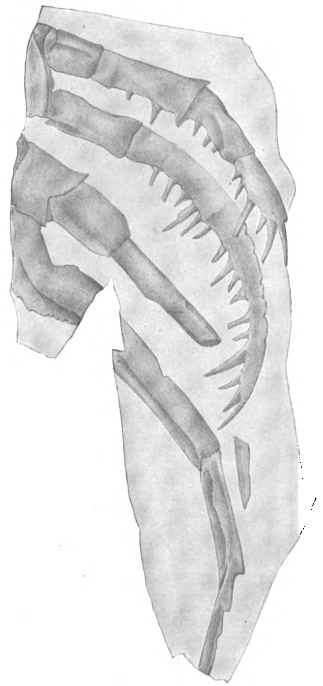
Laurieipterus.

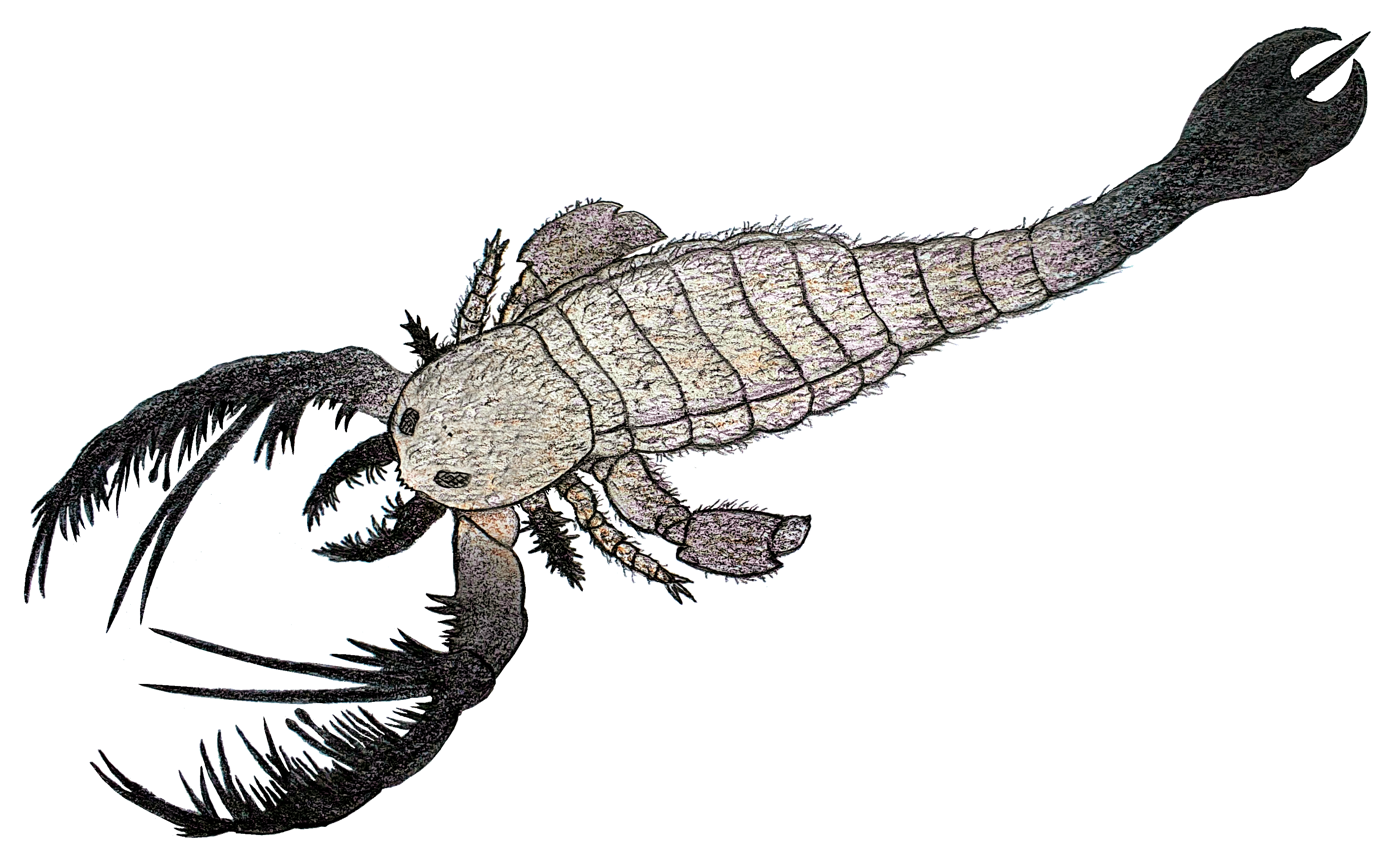
Megalograptus.

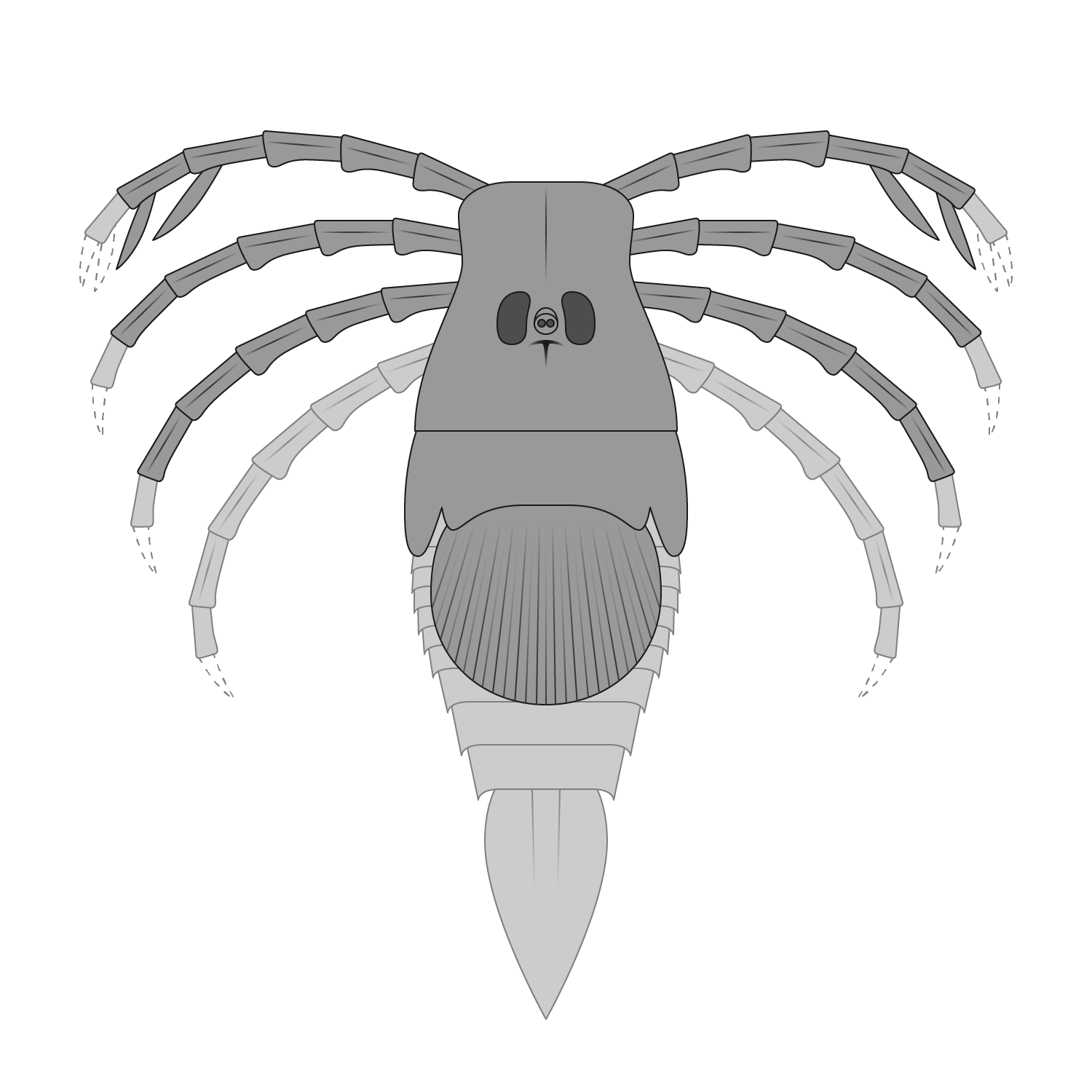
Megarachne.

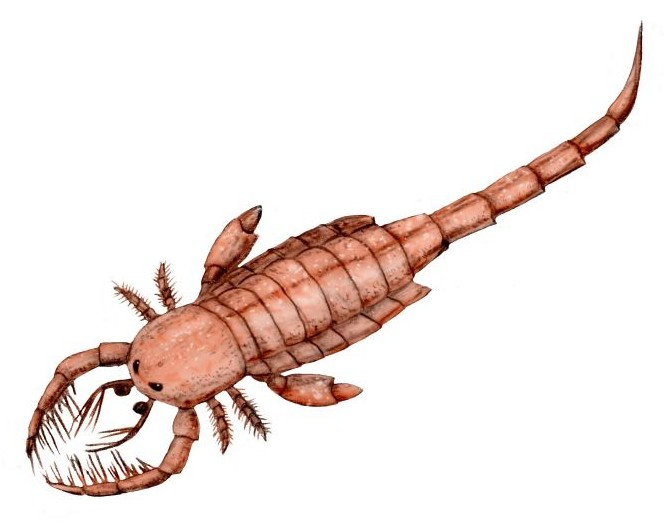
Mixopterus.

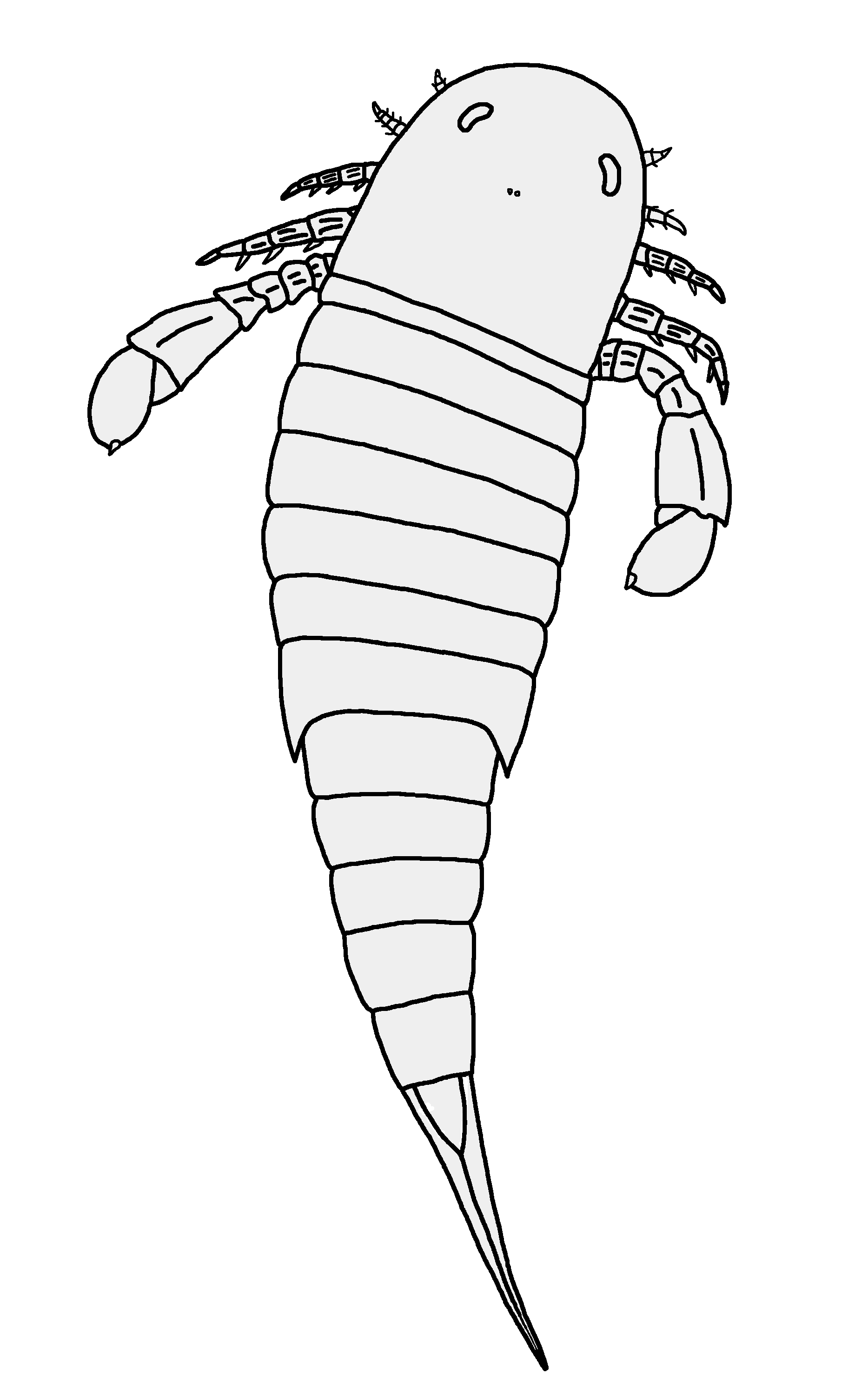
Nanahughmilleria.

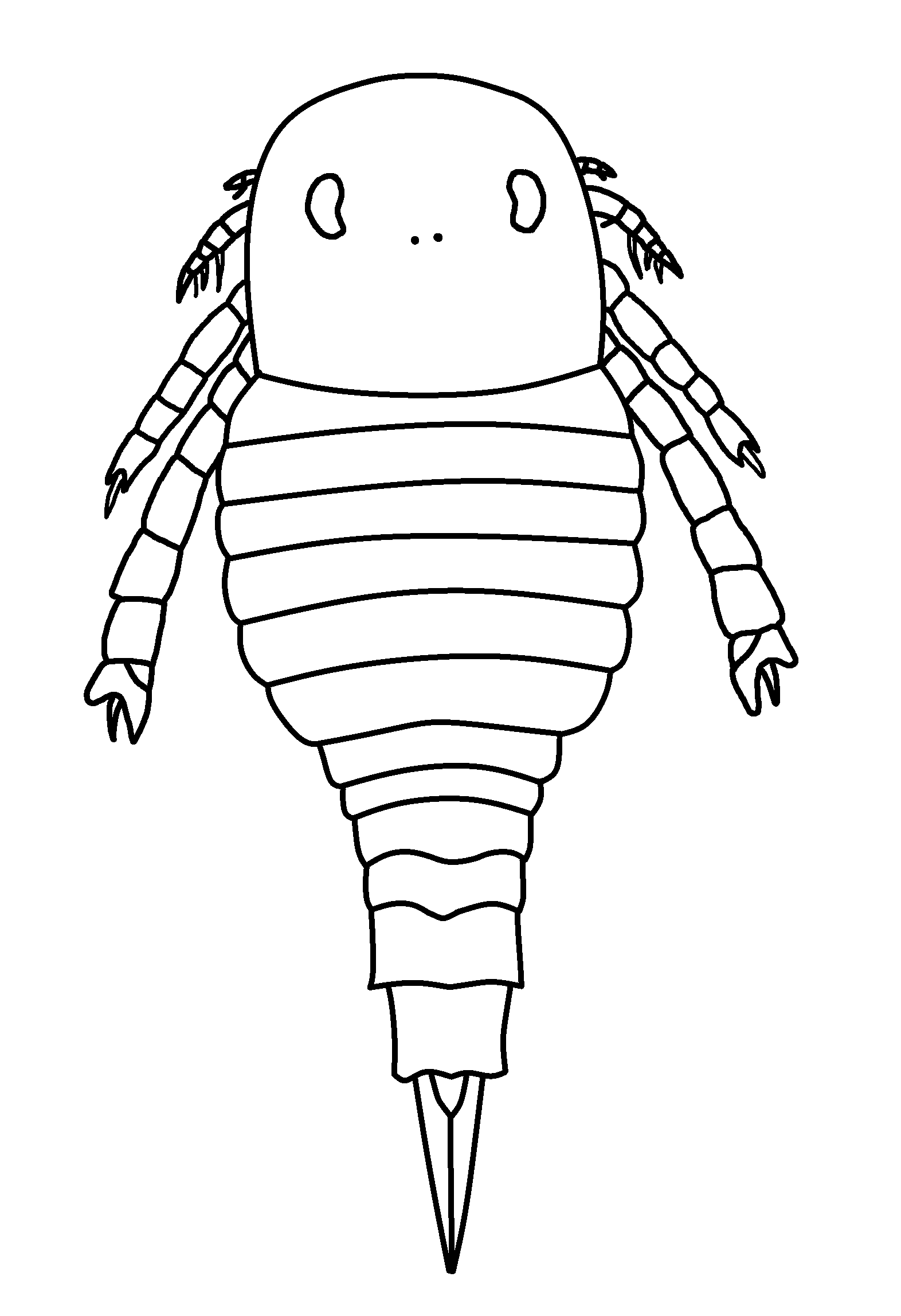
Onychopterella.

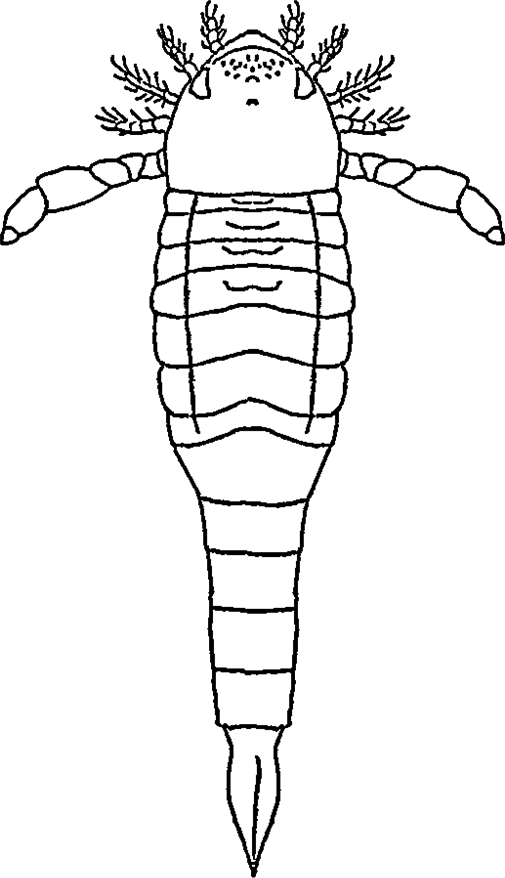
Orcanopterus.

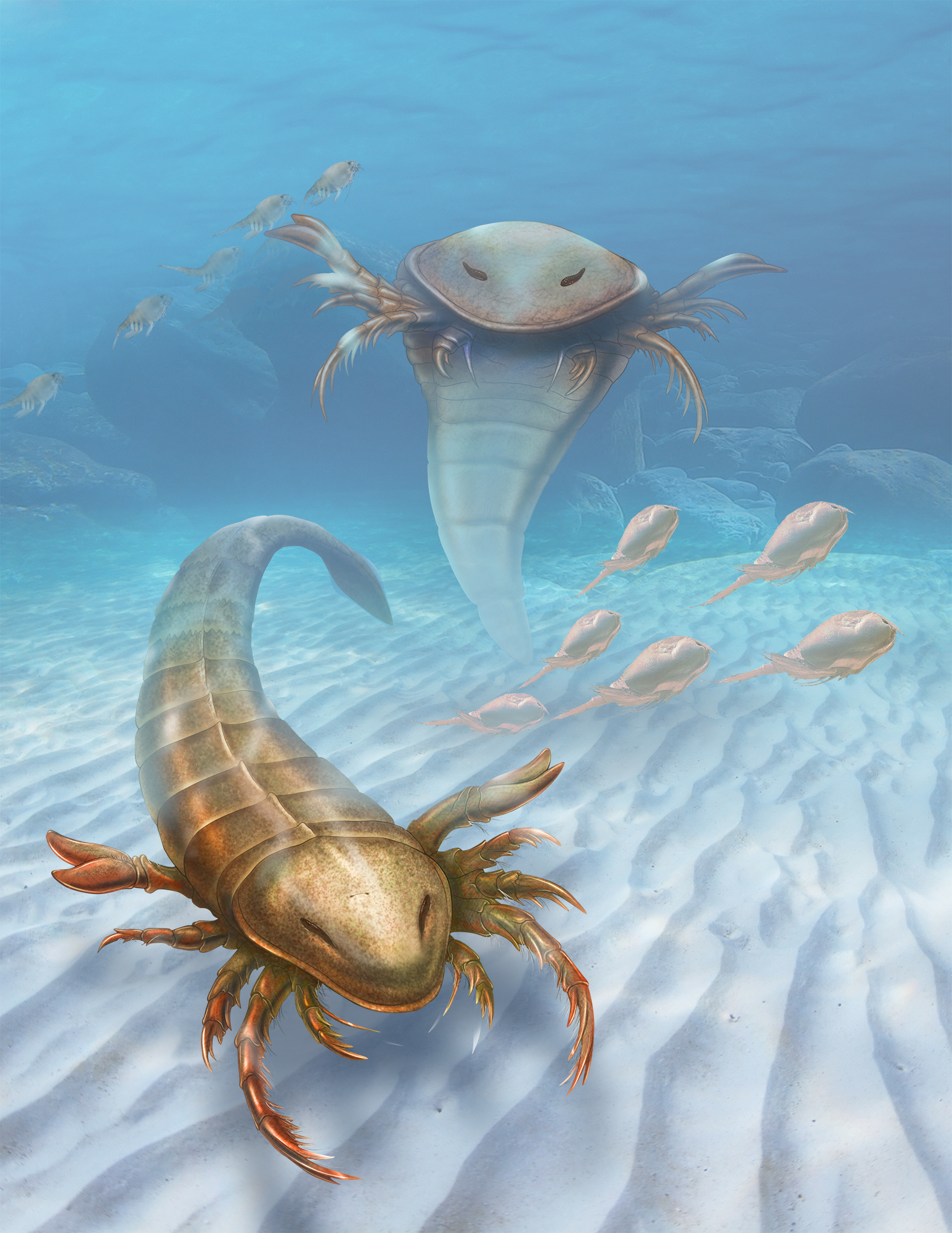
Pentecopterus.

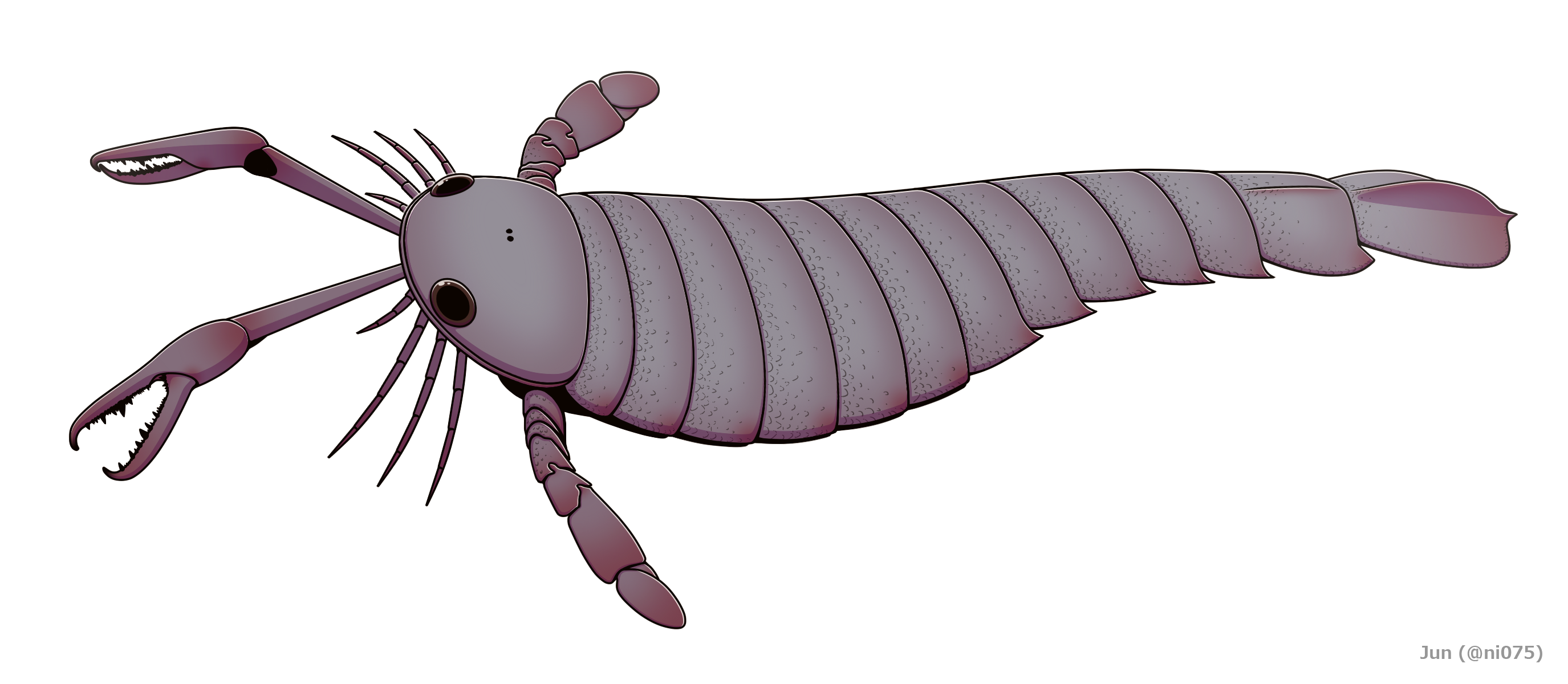
Pterygotus.

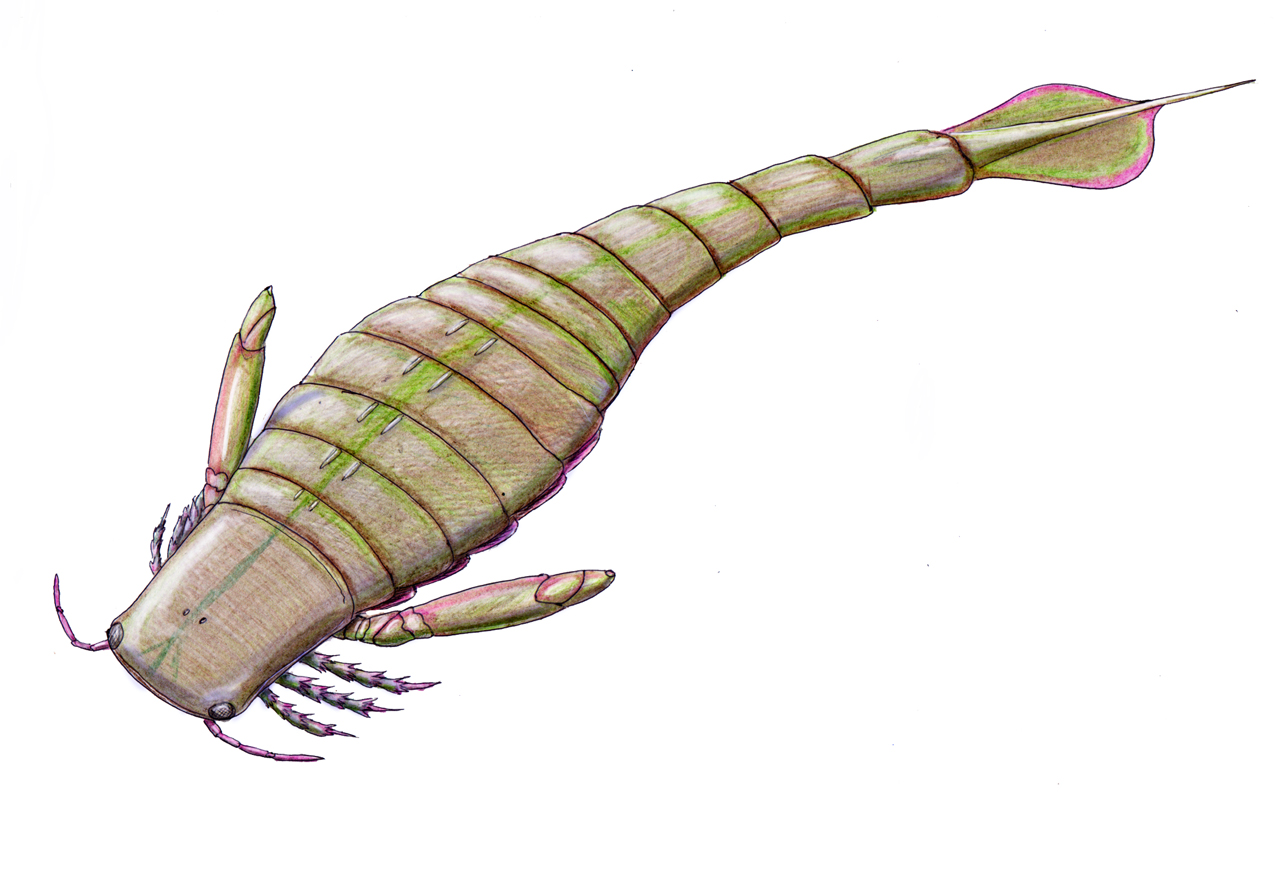
Slimonia.

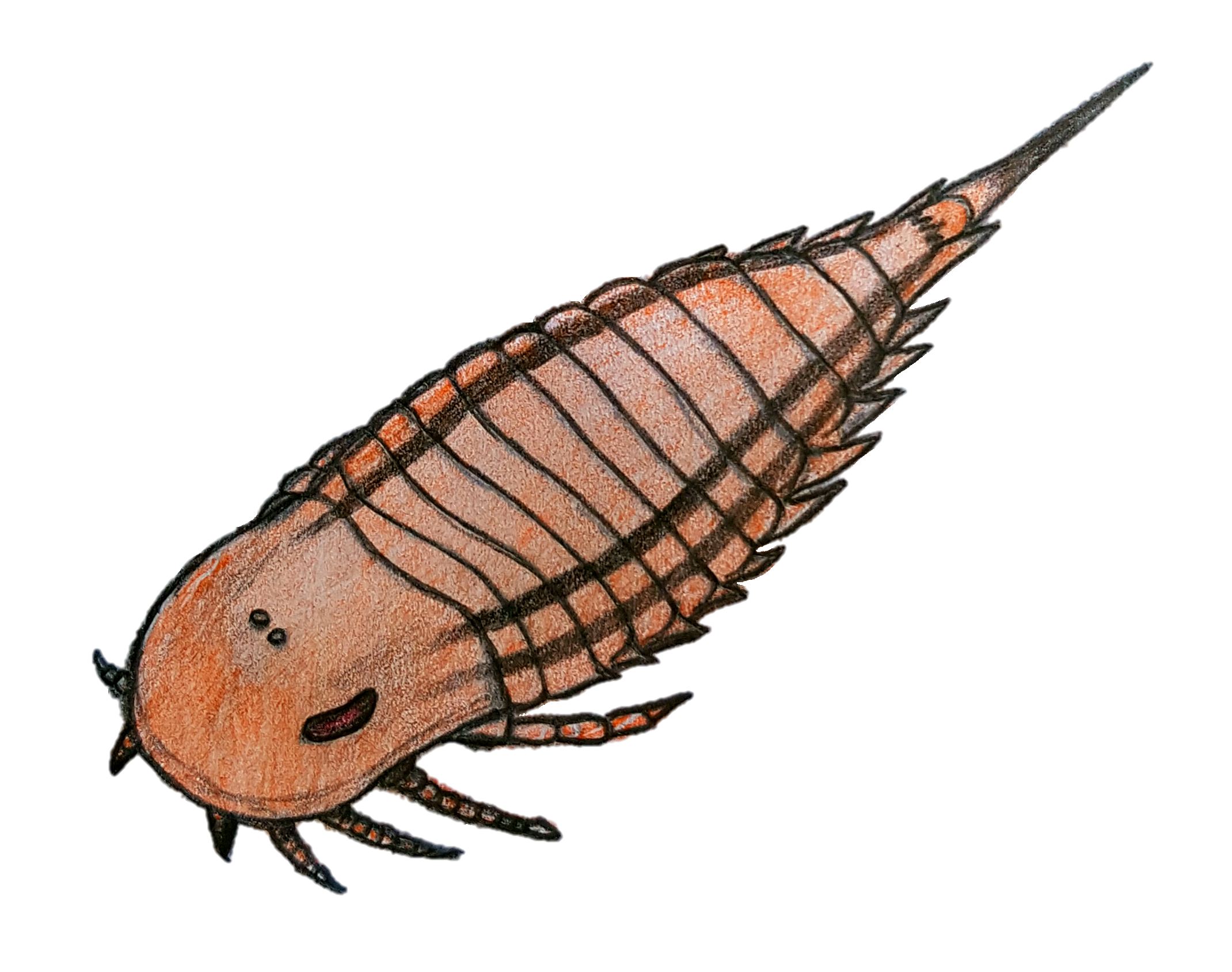
Stoermeropterus.

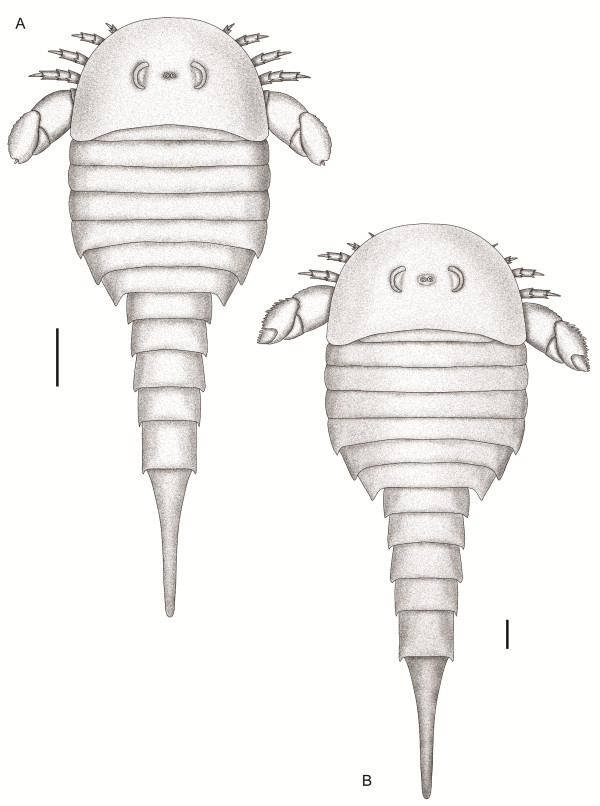
Strobilopterus.

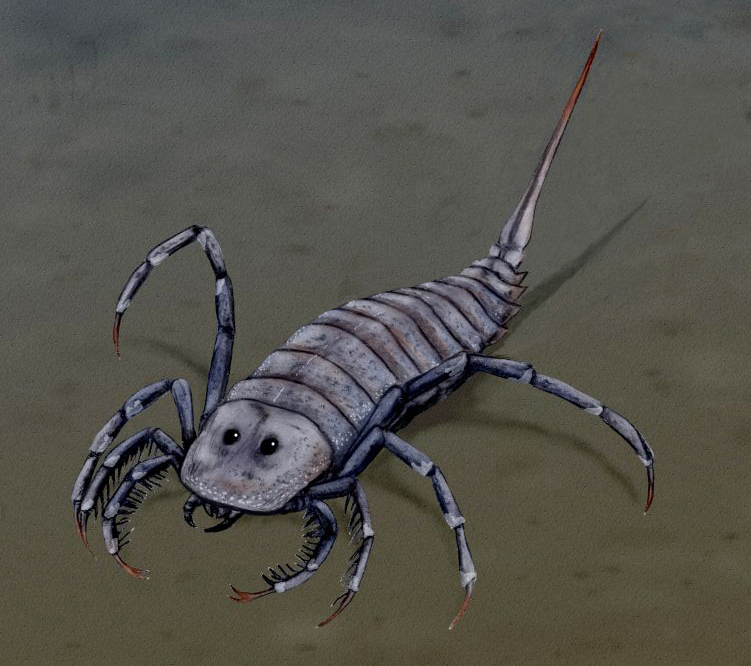
Stylonurus.

== Eurypterid ichnogenera ==
| Genus | Author(s) | Year | Status | Age | Location | Notes |
|---|---|---|---|---|---|---|
| Arcuites | Vrazo & Ciurca | 2017 | Valid | Silurian | Canada; United States | |
| Merostomichnites | Packard | 1900 | Valid | Ordovician - Silurian | Norway; Portugal | Merostomichnites tracks in Norway were likely made by the genus Mixopterus. |
| Palmichnium | Richter | 1954 | Valid | Devonian - Carboniferous | Australia; Canada; United States; Wales | |

== See also ==
- Timeline of eurypterid research
- List of xiphosuran genera
- List of trilobite genera
- List of ammonite genera
- List of prehistoric malacostracans
