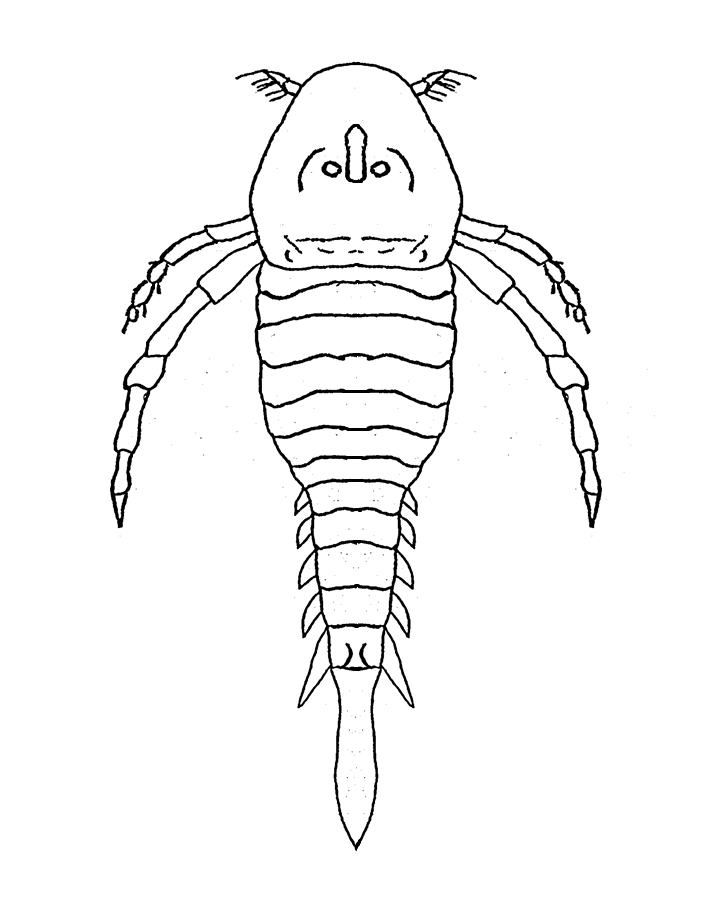
- Reconstruction of Hallipterus.

Scientific classification
- Kingdom: Animalia
- Phylum: Arthropoda
- Subphylum: Chelicerata
- Order: †Eurypterida
- Superfamily: †Kokomopteroidea
- Family: †Hardieopteridae; Tollerton, 1989

Genera
- †Athenepterus; †Hallipterus; †Hardieopterus; †Tarsopterella; †Waterstonopterus

= Hardieopteridae =

Hardieopteridae Temporal range: Early Silurian - Late Devonian, 436–376.1 Ma

Extinct family of arthropods

The Hardieopteridae are a family of eurypterids, an extinct group of chelicerate arthropods commonly known as "sea scorpions". The family is one of two families contained in the superfamily Kokomopteroidea (along with Kokomopteridae), which in turn is one of four superfamilies classified as part of the suborder Stylonurina. Hardieopterids have been recovered from deposits of Early Silurian to Late Devonian age in the United States, the United Kingdom, and Belgium.

Hardieopterids are defined as kokomopteroids with lateral pleurae on their metastoma and pretelson, large lunate scales on the posterior margin of the carapace and a clavate telson. The opisthosoma shows both a second and fourth order differentiation into a mesosoma and metasoma. Appendages II-IV are unknown, though appendage V is spiniferous and VI is non-spiniferous as in the genus Hardieopterus.

The Hardieopteridae display some adaptations towards sweep-feeding, such as a broadening of the metastoma and the spines of the anterior prosomal appendages and may even have been benthic bottomdwellers living partially buried in the substrate.

== Genera ==
Family Hardieopteridae Tollerton, 1989

- Athenepterus Lamsdell, 2025
- Hallipterus Kjellesvig-Waering, 1963
- Hardieopterus Waterston, 1979
- Tarsopterella Størmer, 1951
- Waterstonopterus Lamsdell, 2025
