= Polystomurum =

Polystomurum Temporal range: Devonian

Scientific classification
- Kingdom: Animalia
- Phylum: Arthropoda
- (unranked): Deuteropoda
- Subphylum: Chelicerata
- Clade: Euchelicerata (?)
- Genus: †Polystomurum; Novojilov, 1958

Type species
- †Polystomurum stormeri Novojilov, 1958

Extinct genus of Devonian organisms

Polystomurum is a Devonian genus from Siberia, Russia (then the Soviet Union). It was initially described by Nestor Novojilov in 1958 as a eurypterid with affinities to Marsupipterus inside the family Stylonuridae. Nowadays, it is classified as incertae sedis inside Euchelicerata.
