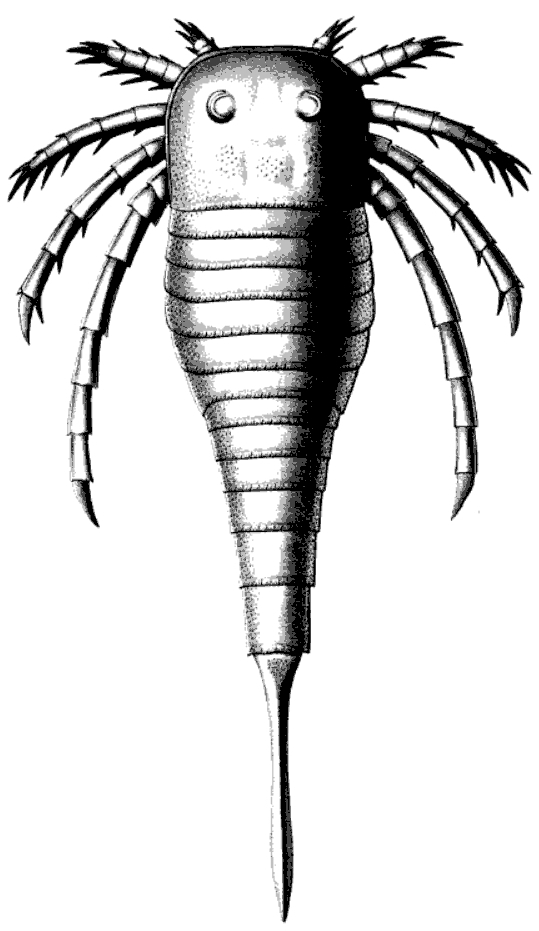
- Restoration of K. longicaudatus

Scientific classification
- Kingdom: Animalia
- Phylum: Arthropoda
- Subphylum: Chelicerata
- Order: †Eurypterida
- Superfamily: †Kokomopteroidea
- Family: †Kokomopteridae
- Genus: †Kokomopterus; Kjellesvig-Waering, 1966

Type species
- †Kokomopterus longicaudatus Clarke & Ruedemann, 1912

= Kokomopterus =

Kokomopterus Temporal range: Late Silurian, 418.7–416 Ma

Extinct genus of sea scorpions

Kokomopterus is a genus of prehistoric eurypterid. The genus contains a single species, Kokomopterus longicaudatus, known from the Silurian of Kokomo, Indiana.

== See also ==
- List of eurypterids
