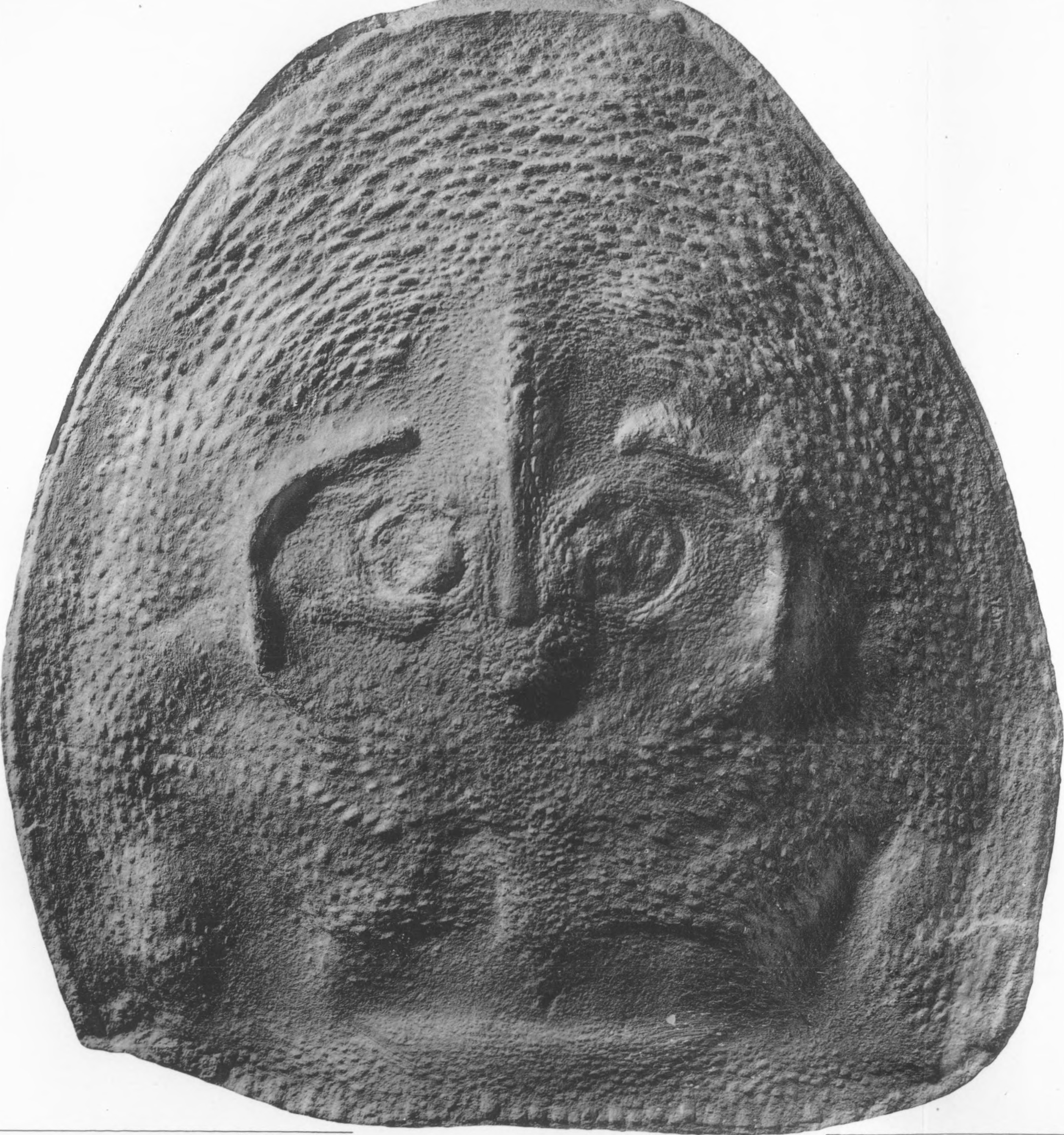
- Carapace of H. excelsior
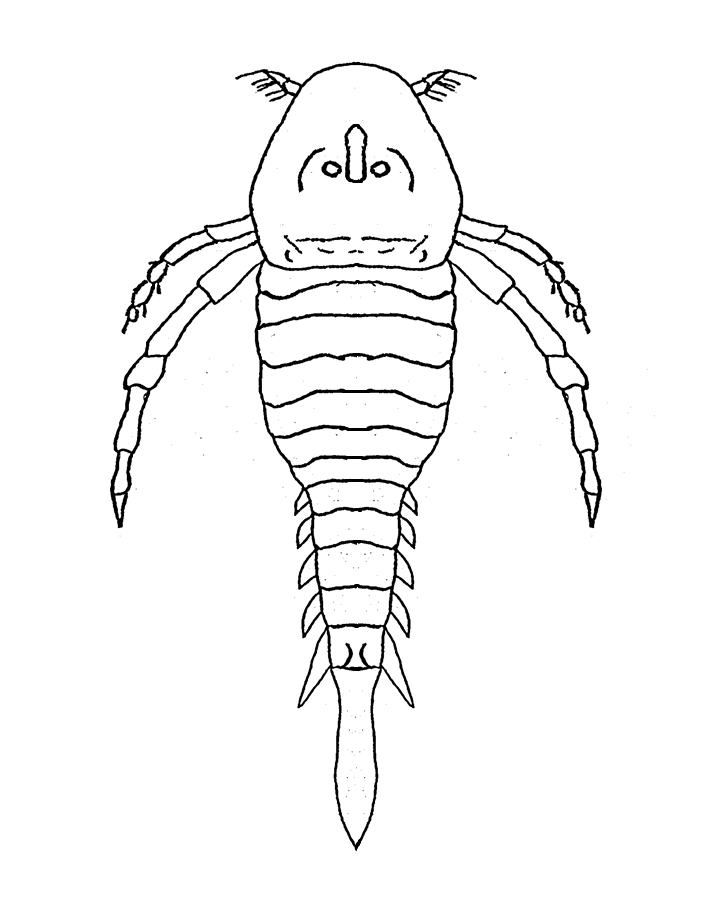
- Reconstruction after Tetlie (2008)

Scientific classification
- Kingdom: Animalia
- Phylum: Arthropoda
- Subphylum: Chelicerata
- Order: †Eurypterida
- Superfamily: †Kokomopteroidea
- Family: †Hardieopteridae
- Genus: †Hallipterus; Kjellesvig-Waering, 1963

Type species
- †Hallipterus excelsior Hall, 1884

Synonyms
- Dolichocephala Claypole, 1883

= Hallipterus =

Hallipterus Temporal range: Devonian, 383.7–376.1 Ma

Extinct genus of arthropods

Hallipterus is a genus of prehistoric eurypterid classified as part of the family Hardieopteridae.

== Description ==
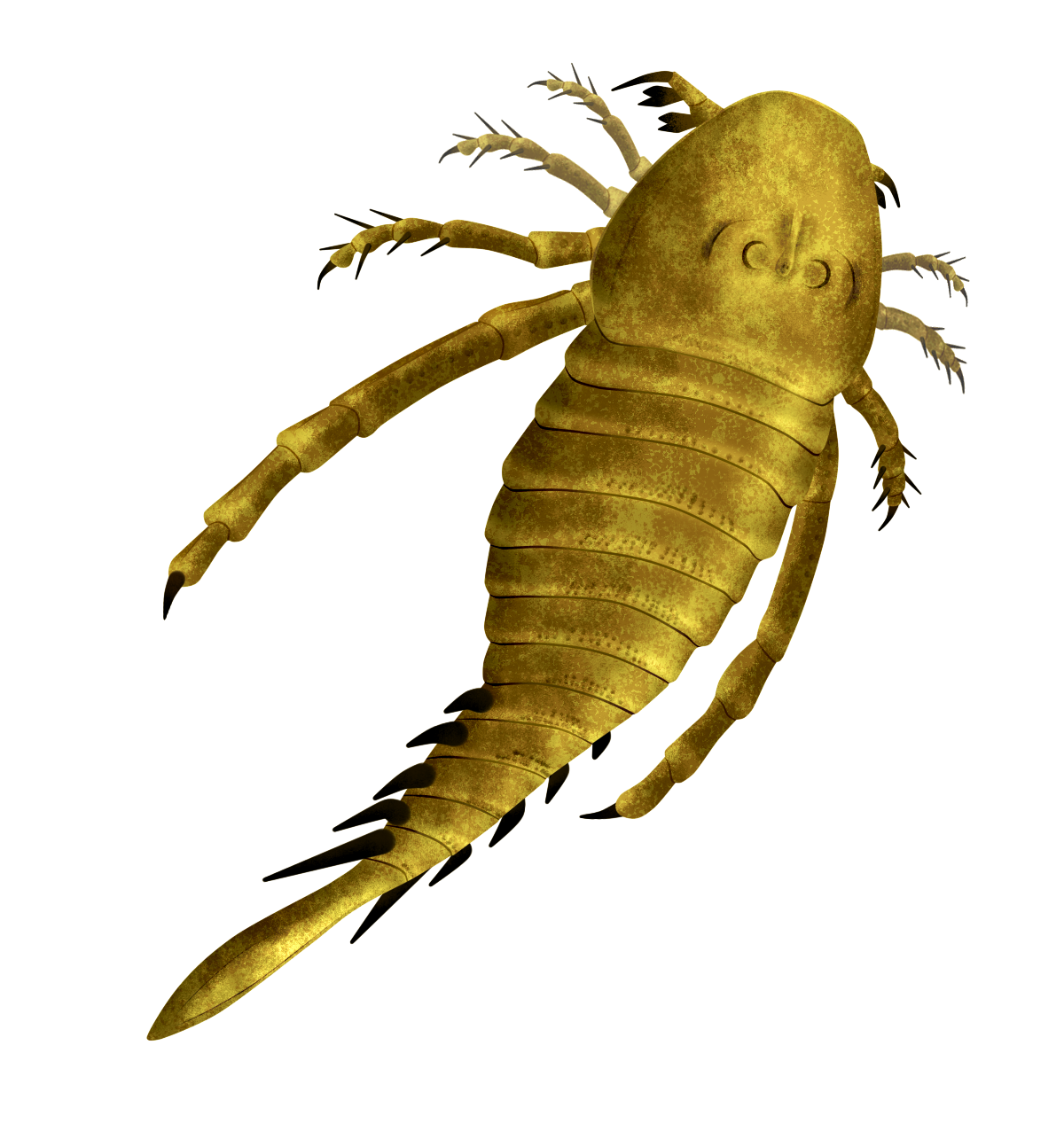
Life restoration, 2nd and 3rd pairs of legs are speculative

Hallipterus was a gigantic Hardieopterid eurypterid. Though some previous estimates have placed its size at over 1.5 meters in length, these were likely excessive. Still, assigned specimens suggest a size of over 1 meter long.

The carapace was subelliptical, greater in length than in width, with a prominent and unornamented marginal rim. The eyes were very small, close to each other and separated by a prominent median ridge with large ocelli at the posterior extremity.

The chelicerae were simple and elongated. The first walking legs possessed flat and movable spines. The rest of the legs and the opisthosoma remain unknown.

== Species ==
Hallipterus contains one valid species, H. excelsior, from the Devonian of New York. Another species was once recognized from similarly aged deposits in Pennsylvania, "H. lacoanus", but it is today seen as synonymous with H. excelsior.

== See also ==
- List of eurypterids
