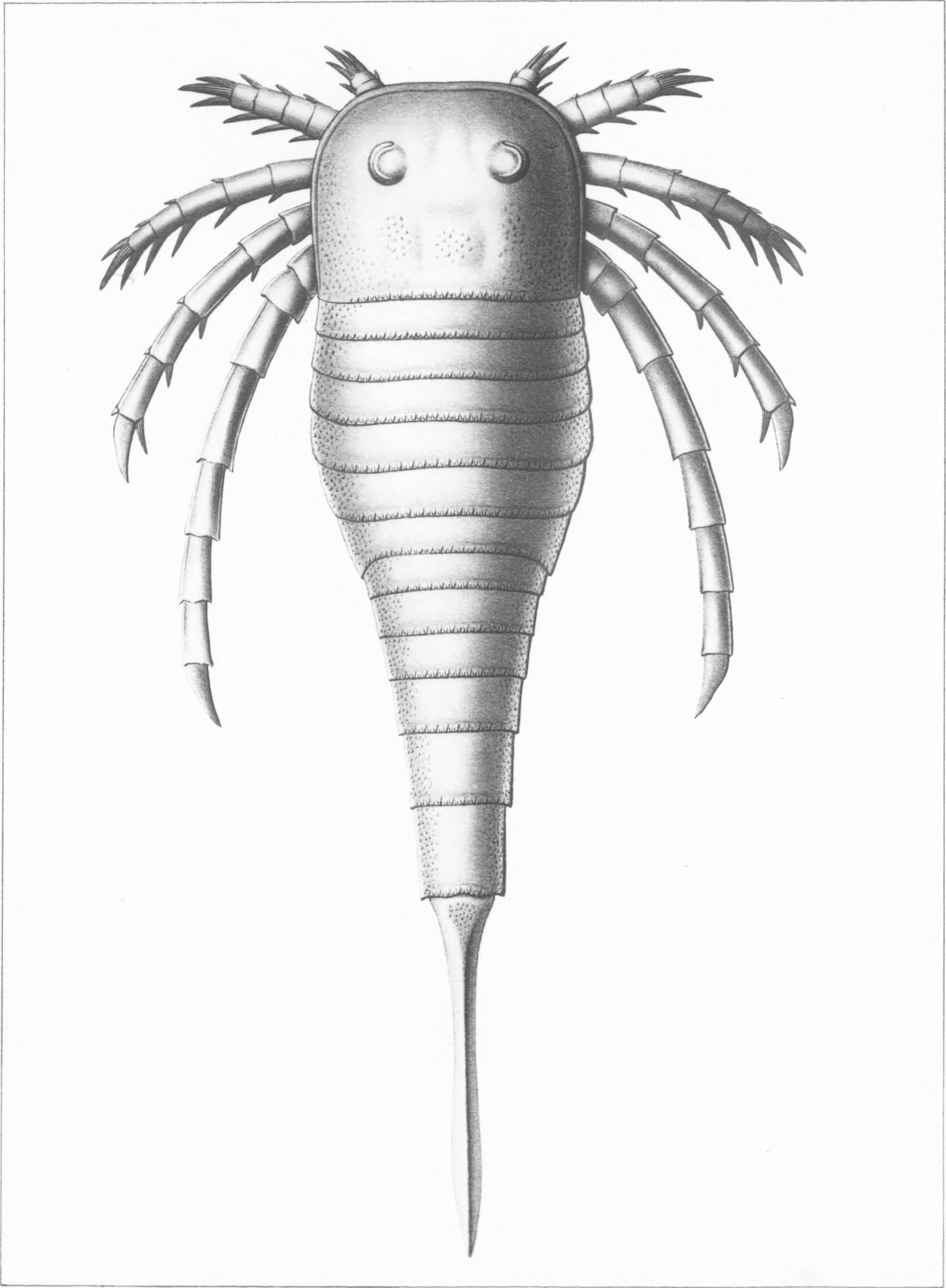
- Reconstruction of Kokomopterus.

Scientific classification
- Kingdom: Animalia
- Phylum: Arthropoda
- Subphylum: Chelicerata
- Order: †Eurypterida
- Superfamily: †Kokomopteroidea
- Family: †Kokomopteridae; Kjellesvig-Waering, 1966

Genera
- †Kokomopterus; †Lamontopterus

= Kokomopteridae =

Kokomopteridae Temporal range: Silurian, 443.7–416 Ma

Extinct family of arthropods

The Kokomopteridae are a family of eurypterids, an extinct group of chelicerate arthropods commonly known as "sea scorpions". The family is one of two families contained in the superfamily Kokomopteroidea (along with Hardieopteridae), which in turn is one of four superfamilies classified as part of the suborder Stylonurina.

Kokomopterids are defined as kokomopteroids with an undifferentiated opisthosoma with a marginal rim. Appendages II-V are spiniferous as in Lamontopterus and VI is non-spiniferous as in Kokomopterus.

The Kokomopteridae retains primitive Hughmilleria-type prosomal appendages II-IV, unsuited to the sweep-feeding lifestyle used by some of the superfamilies of the Stylonurina (Stylonuroidea and Hibbertopteroidea), and were as such likely mainly scavengers.

== Genera ==
Family Kokomopteridae Kjellesvig-Waering, 1966

- Kokomopterus Kjellesvig-Waering, 1966
- Lamontopterus Waterston, 1979
