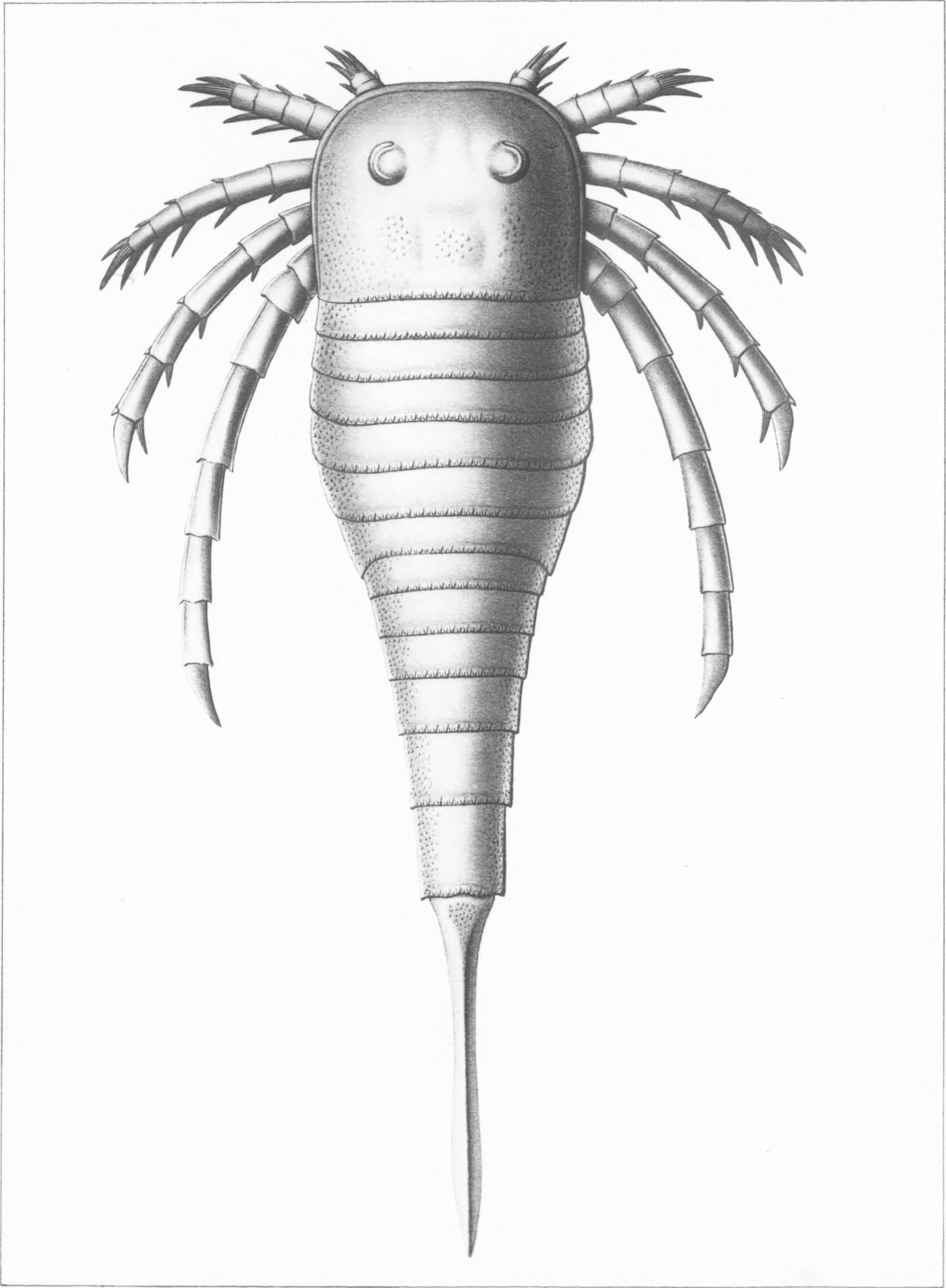
- Reconstruction of Kokomopterus, a kokomopterid

Scientific classification
- Kingdom: Animalia
- Phylum: Arthropoda
- Subphylum: Chelicerata
- Order: †Eurypterida
- Suborder: †Stylonurina
- Superfamily: †Kokomopteroidea; Kjellesvig-Waering, 1966

Families
- †Kokomopteridae; †Hardieopteridae

= Kokomopteroidea =

Kokomopteroidea Temporal range: Early Silurian - Late Devonian, 443.7–376.1 Ma

Extinct superfamily of arthropods

Kokomopteroidea is an extinct superfamily of eurypterids, an extinct group of chelicerate arthropods commonly known as "sea scorpions". It is one of four superfamilies classified as part of the suborder Stylonurina. Kokomopteroids have been recovered from deposits of Early Silurian to Late Devonian age in the United States and the United Kingdom.

== Description ==
Kokomopteroids are stylonurines with a spiniferous appendage V and a posterior notch on the metastoma. The superfamily forms two distinct clades; the Kokomopteridae (including the genera Kokomopterus and Lamontopterus) and the Hardieopteridae (including the genera Hardieopterus, Tarsopterella and Hallipterus).

The Kokomopteroidea retains primitive Hughmilleria-type prosomal appendages for unsuitable raking through the bottom sediments of marine environments. As such, the members of the superfamily were likely scavengers. The Hardieopteridae display some sweep-feeding characteristics similarly to members of the superfamilies Hibbertopteroidea and Stylonuroidea, including a broadening of the metastoma and the spines of the anterior prosomal appendages. Hardieopterids may even have been benthic bottomdwellers partially living buried in the substrate.

== Systematics and genera ==
The Kokomopteroids are eurypterids classified as part of the suborder Stylonurina. They are a sister group to the Hibbertopteroidea, united by a median ridge on the carapace between the lateral eyes and a distal thickening to the podomeres of the prosomal appendages. The primitive hibbertopteroid Drepanopterus is a sister taxon to all other hibbertopteroids and shares certain characteristics with the Kokomopteroidea (such as a clavate telson).

Kokomopteroidea contains two families, the Kokomopteridae and Hardieopteridae. The Kokomopteridae is defined as kokomopteroids with undifferentiated opisthosoma with a marginal rim and the appendages II-V being spiniferous as in Lamontopterus, with appendage VI not being spiniferous, as in Kokomopterus. The Hardieopteridae is defined as kokomopteroids with lateral pleurae on the metasoma and pretelson, large lunate scales on the posterior carapace margin and a clavate telson. The opisthosoma shows both second and fourth order differentiation into a mesosoma and metasoma in the Hardieopteridae, with appendage V being spiniferous and VI being non-spiniferous as in Hardieopterus. The Kokomopteridae is only known from the Silurian, the temporal range of the Hardieopteridae extends further to the Late Devonian.

Superfamily Kokomopteroidea Kjellesvig-Waering, 1966

- Family Kokomopteridae Kjellesvig-Waering, 1966
  - Kokomopterus Kjellesvig-Waering, 1966
  - Lamontopterus Waterston, 1979
- Family Hardieopteridae Tollerton, 1989
  - Athenepterus Lamsdell, 2025
  - Hallipterus Kjellesvig-Waering, 1963
  - Hardieopterus Waterston, 1979
  - Tarsopterella Størmer, 1951
  - Waterstonopterus Lamsdell, 2025
