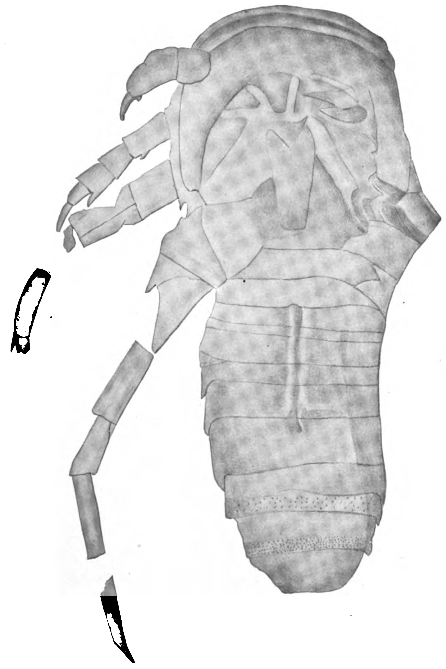
- Fossil of H. macrophthalmus

Scientific classification
- Kingdom: Animalia
- Phylum: Arthropoda
- Subphylum: Chelicerata
- Order: †Eurypterida
- Superfamily: †Kokomopteroidea
- Family: †Hardieopteridae
- Genus: †Hardieopterus; Waterston, 1979
- Species: †H. macrophthalmus

Binomial name
- †Hardieopterus macrophthalmus (Laurie, 1892)

= Hardieopterus =

Hardieopterus Temporal range: Silurian, 436–416 Ma

Extinct genus of arthropods

Hardieopterus is a genus of prehistoric eurypterid classified within the family Hardieopteridae.

The genus was previously considered to contain four species, all Silurian in age; H. lanarkensis and H. macrophthalmus from Scotland, H. megalops from England and H. myops from the United States. Only the type species, H. macrophthalmus, is now considered to belong to Hardieopterus, the others having been assigned to the separate genera Athenepterus (H. megalops) and Waterstonopterus (H. lanarkensis, H. myops).

== See also ==
- List of eurypterids
