= Lamontopterus =

Lamontopterus Temporal range: Early Silurian, 443.7–428.2 Ma

Scientific classification
- Kingdom: Animalia
- Phylum: Arthropoda
- Subphylum: Chelicerata
- Order: †Eurypterida
- Superfamily: †Kokomopteroidea
- Family: †Kokomopteridae
- Genus: †Lamontopterus; Waterston, 1979

Type species
- †Lamontopterus knoxae Lamont, 1955

Extinct genus of arthropods

Lamontopterus is a genus of prehistoric eurypterid classified within the family Kokomopteridae. It contains one species, Lamontopterus knoxae, from the Early Silurian of Scotland.

== See also ==
- List of eurypterids
