= Eurypterella =

Eurypterella Temporal range: Carboniferous

Scientific classification
- Kingdom: Animalia
- Phylum: Arthropoda
- Genus: Eurypterella Matthew, 1888
- Species: E. ornata

Binomial name
- Eurypterella ornata Matthew, 1888

Eurypterella is a dubious genus of prehistoric arthropod from the Carboniferous period of Canada. Eurypterella ornata, the only species assigned to the genus, was originally described as a eurypterid, and was briefly mentioned as such in several accounts of North American eurypterids, though often regarded as dubious. In 2004, it was briefly regarded as possibly representing a trigonotarbid arachnid, but the tapering form and lack of divided tergites into median and lateral plates complicates such a classification. A 2007 re-examination of the holotype (and only known) specimen NBMG 3002 concluded that it was too poorly preserved to be able to be identified or assigned to any particular group of arthropods, and was thus treated as a nomen dubium.
