= Tarsopterella =

Tarsopterella Temporal range: Early Devonian, 416–409.1 Ma

Scientific classification
- Kingdom: Animalia
- Phylum: Arthropoda
- Subphylum: Chelicerata
- Order: †Eurypterida
- Superfamily: †Kokomopteroidea
- Family: †Hardieopteridae
- Genus: †Tarsopterella; Størmer, 1951

Type species
- Tarsopterella brewsteri (Woodward, 1864)

Synonyms
- Eurypterus brewsteri Woodward, 1864; Stylonurus scoticus Woodward, 1865; Tarsopterella scotica (Woodward, 1865)

Extinct genus of sea scorpions

Tarsopterella is a genus of prehistoric eurypterid classified within the family Hardieopteridae. It contains only one species, T. brewsteri from the Lower Devonian of Scotland.

== Description ==
Tarsopterella is distinguished by its prosoma (head), which is subrectangular and slightly concave in front, with small compound eyes. Its abdomen has pronounced lateral epimera (marginal spines similar to those of horseshoe crabs). Tarsopterella dates from the Lower Devonian period.
