= Marsupipterus =

Marsupipterus Temporal range: Silurian

Scientific classification
- Kingdom: Animalia
- Phylum: Arthropoda
- Clade: Pancrustacea
- Class: Malacostraca
- Subclass: Phyllocarida
- Genus: †Marsupipterus; Caster & Kjellesvig-Waering, 1955

Type species
- Marsupipterus sculpturatus Caster & Kjellesvig-Waering, 1955

Extinct genus of eurypterids

Marsupipterus is a genus of prehistoric crustacean. The genus contains one species, Marsupipterus sculpturatus, from the Silurian of England. Originally described as an eurypterid, Marsupipterus has since been found to have been a phyllocarid crustacean.
