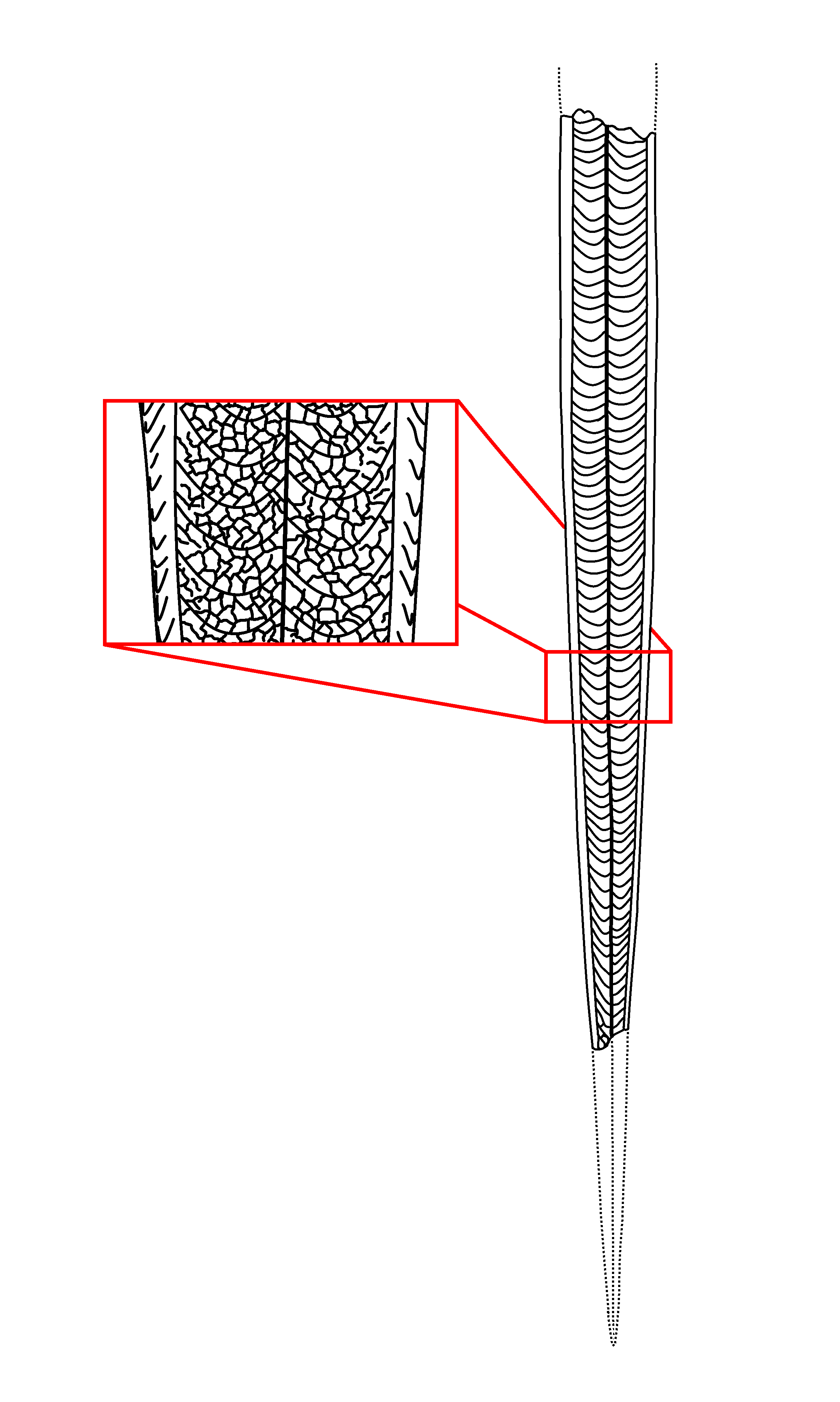
- Interpretive drawing of the holotype and only known specimen of Dorfopterus, including a close-up on the ornamentation of the fossil.

Scientific classification
- Kingdom: Animalia
- Phylum: Arthropoda
- Subphylum: Chelicerata
- Order: †Eurypterida
- Family: †incertae sedis
- Genus: †Dorfopterus; Kjellesvig-Waering, 1955

Type species
- †Dorfopterus angusticollis Kjellesvig-Waering, 1955

= Dorfopterus =

Dorfopterus Temporal range: Emsian, 407.6–393.3 Ma

Extinct genus of arthropods

Dorfopterus is a genus of extinct invertebrate, possibly an eurypterid. Only one fossil of the single and type species, D. angusticollis, has been discovered in deposits of the Early Devonian period (Emsian stage) in the Beartooth Butte Formation in Wyoming, in the United States. The first half of the name of the genus honors the discoverer of this formation, Erling Dorf, while the second half consists in the Ancient Greek word πτερόν (pteron), meaning "wing". The species name angusticollis is composed of the Latin words angustus ("narrow") and collum ("neck").

The only known specimen of Dorfopterus consists of an incomplete uncrushed telson (the posteriormost division of the body), which was long, narrow, styliform and with a central carina ("keel"). It had a special ornamentation consisting of rib-like curved lines on each side of the telson with reticulated (net-like) patterns between them. This ornamentation was unique, and was not known to have occurred in any other eurypterid at the time of the specimen's discovery.

Originally described as part of Stylonuridae by the American paleontologist Erik Norman Kjellesvig-Waering in 1955, the strange morphology and the little known fossil material of Dorfopterus have made the classification of this genus problematic. Currently, it is considered as incertae sedis (a taxon with unclear relationships) within Eurypterida, although Dorfopterus being a eurypterid at all has also been questioned. The locality in which Dorfopterus was found, the Beartooth Butte Formation, is home to fossils of many fish, plants and a few other eurypterids. The genus is believed to have lived in an estuarine inland channel.

== Description ==
Dorfopterus was originally described as a stylonurid eurypterid of medium size. Genera currently classified as part of Stylonuridae had lengths ranging from 10 centimetres (3.9 inches) to 1.15 metres (3 feet 9 inches), the smallest of them being Ctenopterus cestrotus and the biggest being Pagea plotnicki.

Dorfopterus is a poorly known eurypterid that is only known from one single specimen. It has been interpreted as representing a dorsal impression of its telson (the posteriormost division of its body). The telson on this specimen is uncrushed, although its base and distal part (its end) are not preserved. The preserved fragment is 12.6 cm (5.0 in) long, the complete telson potentially having had a length of 18 cm (7.1 in). It had its greatest width, 1.3 cm (0.51 in), on the base, while in the middle, the telson was 1.1 cm (0.43 in) wide.

The telson of Dorfopterus was long and very narrow, with a spike-like shape, styliform and slightly carinated (with a not very pronounced "keel", ridge). This keel spread over the entire length of the central part of the telson. The telson was thicker at the carinated part, becoming less thick at its lateral margins (its sides). It was bordered by a flattened rim, which was obliquely striated and had traces of pointed scales. The ornamentation of the telson was highly distinctive, forming a series of raised and backwardly curved rib-like lines evenly spaced from one another on each lateral margin of the telson. As the lines got closer to its distal part, they became more strongly curved. Between each of these rib-like marks was a reticulated (net-like) pattern consisting of very fine, also raised and not as prominent lines.

== History of research ==
Ubication of the section of the Beartooth Butte Formation where the only known specimen of Dorfopterus has been discovered in Wyoming, in the United States.

Dorfopterus' only known specimen, its holotype, was found on Lower Devonian deposits on the Beartooth Butte Formation on Wyoming, in the United States. Originally, the fossil was housed at the former paleontological museum of the Princeton University at New Jersey. In 1988, this university was reorganized, and many of its eurypterid specimens, including that of Dorfopterus, were donated to the Peabody Museum of Natural History at Connecticut.

The specimen of Dorfopterus consists of a dorsal uncrushed impression of most of a telson with a peculiar ornamentation. It was loaned by the American Princeton University paleontology professor Benjamin Franklin Howell to the American paleontologist Erik Norman Kjellesvig-Waering, who found this fossil unique enough as to have its own genus. Despite the little material of which it consisted, he argued that the telson was one of the most diagnostic parts of eurypterid morphology and considered that comparison with other eurypterids was "superfluous" as the length of the telson and its ornamentation were sufficient for identification from other genera. Thus, in 1955, he named the new genus and species Dorfopterus angusticollis based on this fossil. The first part of the generic name, Dorfopterus, honors the American geologist and Princeton University professor Erling Dorf, who discovered the Beartooth Butte Formation on 1934. The second part consists on the Ancient Greek suffix πτερόν (pteron, "wing"), which has been widely used for eurypterid genera. The meaning of its specific name, angusticollis, was not given by Kjellesvig-Waering. However, an American biologist who also used this name in 1995 for a new living species of the weevil genus Lonchophorus specified that it is composed of the Latin words angustus, meaning "narrow", and collum, meaning "neck".

Originally, Kjellesvig-Waering placed Dorfopterus in the family Stylonuridae. He would reaffirm this in 1966 during a study in which he revised the superfamily Stylonuracea (now Stylonuroidea), albeit only tentatively. During this study, Kjellesvig-Waering said that new specimens found by the American paleontologists Robert Howland Denison and Eugene Stanley Richardson, Jr. showed that Dorfopterus was a gigantic eurypterid whose reticulated patterns on the telson repeated on its opisthosomal (of the opisthosoma, its abdomen) tergites (the dorsal halves of the segments eurypterid abdomens are divided in). No year of discovery of these specimens or further explanation about them was given, and later studies never mentioned them. The position of Dorfopterus in Stylonuridae would not be accepted by future researchers, who would first refer Dorfopterus to another eurypterid family called Parastylonuridae and later classify it as an uncertain animal with an unknown position within Eurypterida. Several researchers have even doubted Dorfopterus being a eurypterid at all.

== Classification ==
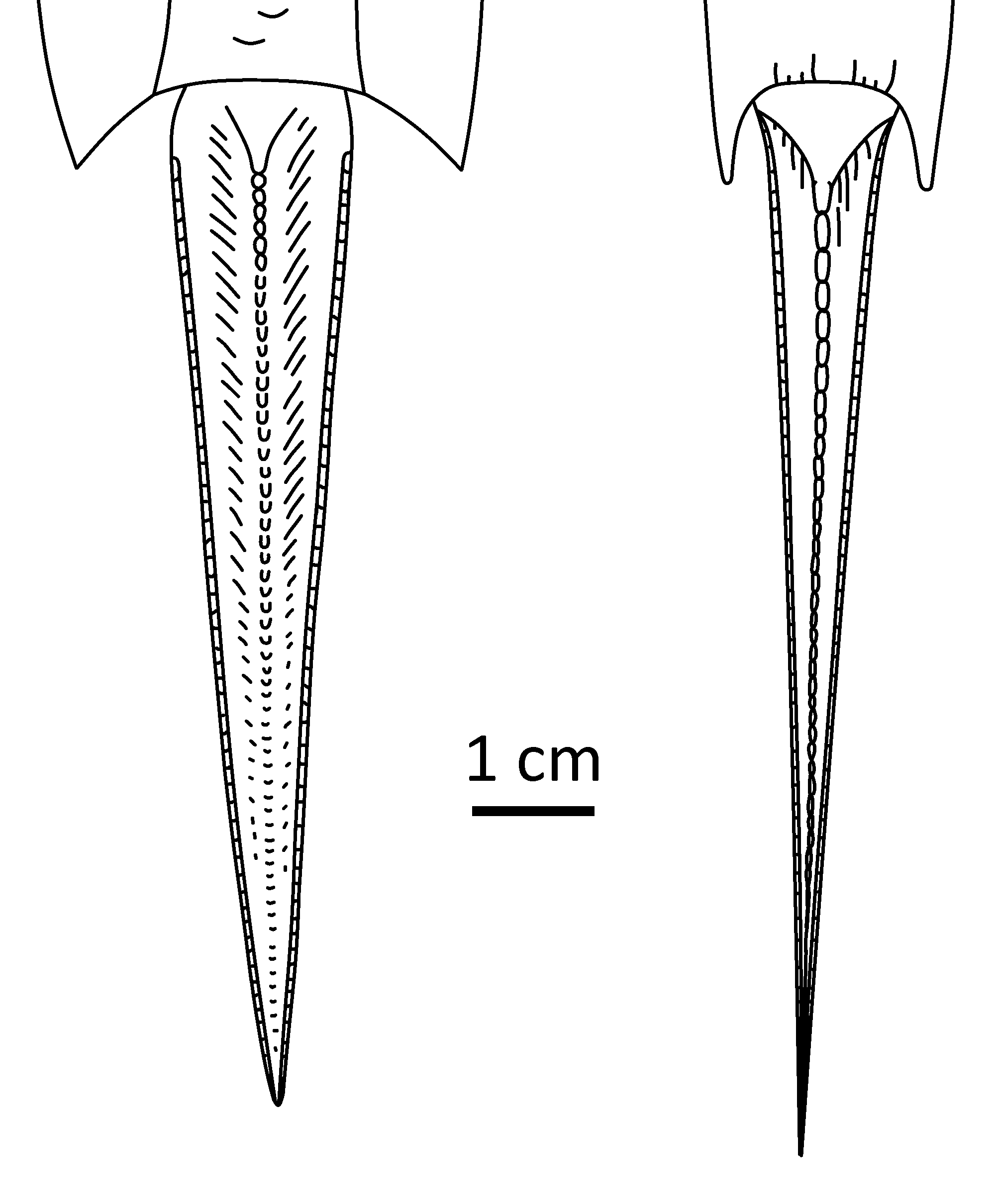
Comparison of the telsons of the species of Parastylonurus (P. ornatus on the left, P. hendersoni on the right) in which it is known. The structure of the telson of this genus has been compared with the telson of Dorfopterus.

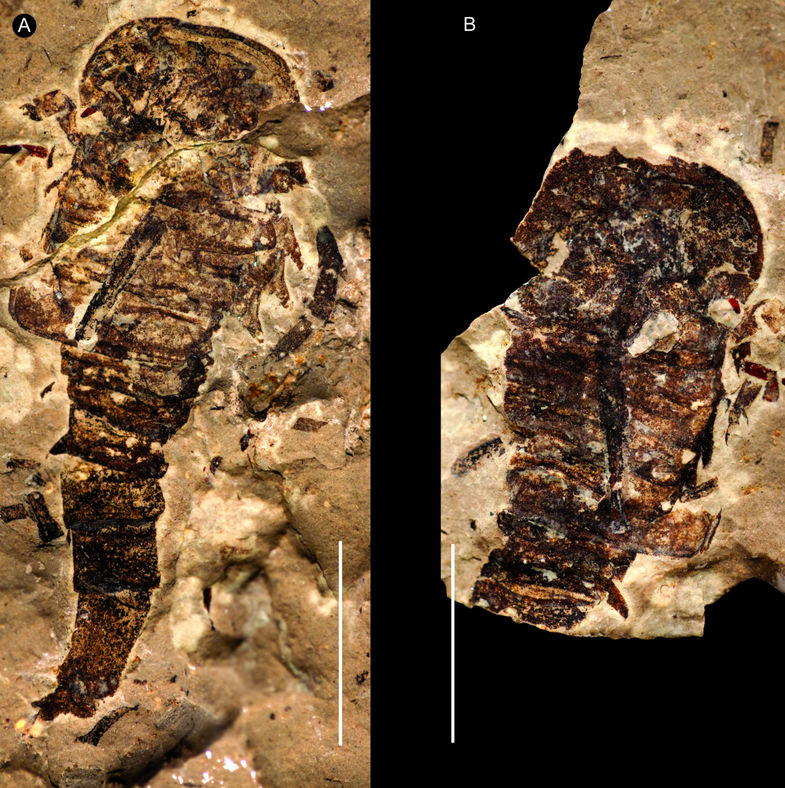
A specimen of Strobilopterus proteus and its counterpart. It has been suggested that Dorfopterus represents a telson of another species of this genus, S. princetonii.

Dorfopterus is currently classified as an incertae sedis (that is, a taxon with unclear relationships) genus within the order Eurypterida. It includes one single species, Dorfopterus angusticollis. Originally, Dorfopterus was classified as part of Stylonuridae. At the time, this family consisted of the genera Brachyopterus, Campylocephalus, Ctenopterus, Drepanopterus, Melbournopterus, Stylonurus and Tarsopterella. The family has since been revised, with new genera having been assigned to it, other genera having been moved to other clades (taxonomic groups) and some genera having even been completely removed from the order Eurypterida. Dorfopterus would not be an exception to these changes; having only been assigned to Stylonuridae due to its long and narrow telson (even though no member of this family or of Eurypterida as a whole was known at the time to have had an ornamentation similar to Dorfopterus as Kjellesvig-Waering admitted), the genus' classification within this family would be rendered as tentative in 1966 by Kjellesvig-Waering himself, although it would be continued by the Norwegian paleontologist Leif Størmer during his 1974 revision of Eurypterida.

In 1979, the British geologist Charles D. Waterston erected a new eurypterid family, Parastylonuridae, and included the genera Hardieopterus, Parastylonurus and, doubtfully, Dorfopterus and Lamontopterus. This family differed from the others by a series of morphological characteristics that included a carinated (or "crested", as he defined it) telson and a granulate (with granules), pustular (with pustules) or squamate (with scales) ornamentation. Waterston compared the rib-like ornamentation and carina ("keel") of Dorfopterus with the structure of the telson of Parastylonurus and assigned the genus to this new family. Waterston's classification of Dorfopterus was not retained by later researchers either, with the American professor and paleobiologist Roy E. Plotnick classifying Dorfopterus as incertae sedis within Eurypterida in 1983. The American paleontologist Victor P. Tollerton, Jr. did the same in 1989 after considering Dorfopterus as too fragmentary for inclusion into a specific eurypterid family, and so did the Norwegian paleontologist Odd Erik Tetlie in an unpublished PhD thesis in 2004 despite having previously stated in the same paper that Dorfopterus could be provisionally kept in Parastylonuridae for the time being due to its similarities with Parastylonurus. These similarities would also lead Tetlie to suggest that Dorfopterus and Parastylonurus could be synonymous genera, although he did not act upon this possibility.

In 2007, Tetlie proposed that the fossil of Dorfopterus could represent the telson of Strobilopterus princetonii, then unknown in the latter except for a juvenile specimen in which it was poorly and fragmentarily preserved. These two eurypterids were found in the same locality, the Beartooth Butte Formation. He had already suggested this back in 2004, in his unpublished thesis. To determine whether this was the case or not, he studied the only known specimen of Dorfopterus through a scanning electron microscope (SEM) and an energy dispersive X-ray analysis (EDAX). This way, Tetlie was able to confirm that it was not some other organism such as a plant or a vertebrate animal that had been erroneously labelled as a eurypterid, but he did not manage to reliably ensure the classification of Dorfopterus within Eurypterida. He thus only tentatively, and not formally, synonymized D. angusticollis with S. princetonii due to the lack of information regarding the telson of the latter. However, in 2013, the American and British palaeontologists James C. Lamsdell and Paul Antony Selden doubted this conclusion, noting that the preservation style of the specimen of Dorfopterus was different from that of the other arthropods discovered in the same locality and that its morphology did not bear close resemblance to any other eurypterid species, again questioning Dorfopterus' assignation within Eurypterida.

In 2025, Lamsdell suggested that Dorfopterus was likely not even an arthropod. Lamsdell noted that the supposed telson of Dorfopterus shared some similarities to the riblike ornamentation of conulariids.

Due to the scarce known fossil material of the genus and its uncertain relation with and within Eurypterida, Dorfopterus has not usually been included in phylogenetic (of phylogenetics, a science branch studying organisms and their evolutionary history) analyses and cladograms. An exception to this was made in 1983, when Plotnick included Dorfopterus on a cladogram in a thesis. The cladogram below follows Plotnick's thesis, which has been simplified to only include major eurypterid clades and incertae sedis genera not pertaining to any of them. The position of the genus on it holds no informative value regarding Dorfopterus though, as it was placed together with the rest of the genera Plotnick considered as incertae sedis at the top of the cladogram, without including it in any specific eurypterid clade. Furthermore, the internal classification and phylogenetics of eurypterids have been substantially revised since 1983, making Plotnick's cladogram greatly misaligned from current knowledge.

- Eurypterida
  - Unionopterus
  - Ruedemannipterus
  - Vernonopterus
  - Dunsopterus
  - Dorfopterus
  - - Stylonurina
      - Mycteropoidea
      - - Rhenopteroidea
        - - Stylonuroidea
    - Eurypterina
      - Moselopteroidea
      - - Eurypteroidea
        - - - Parahughmilleroidea
          - - Mixopteroidea
            - Pterygotioidea

== Paleoecology ==
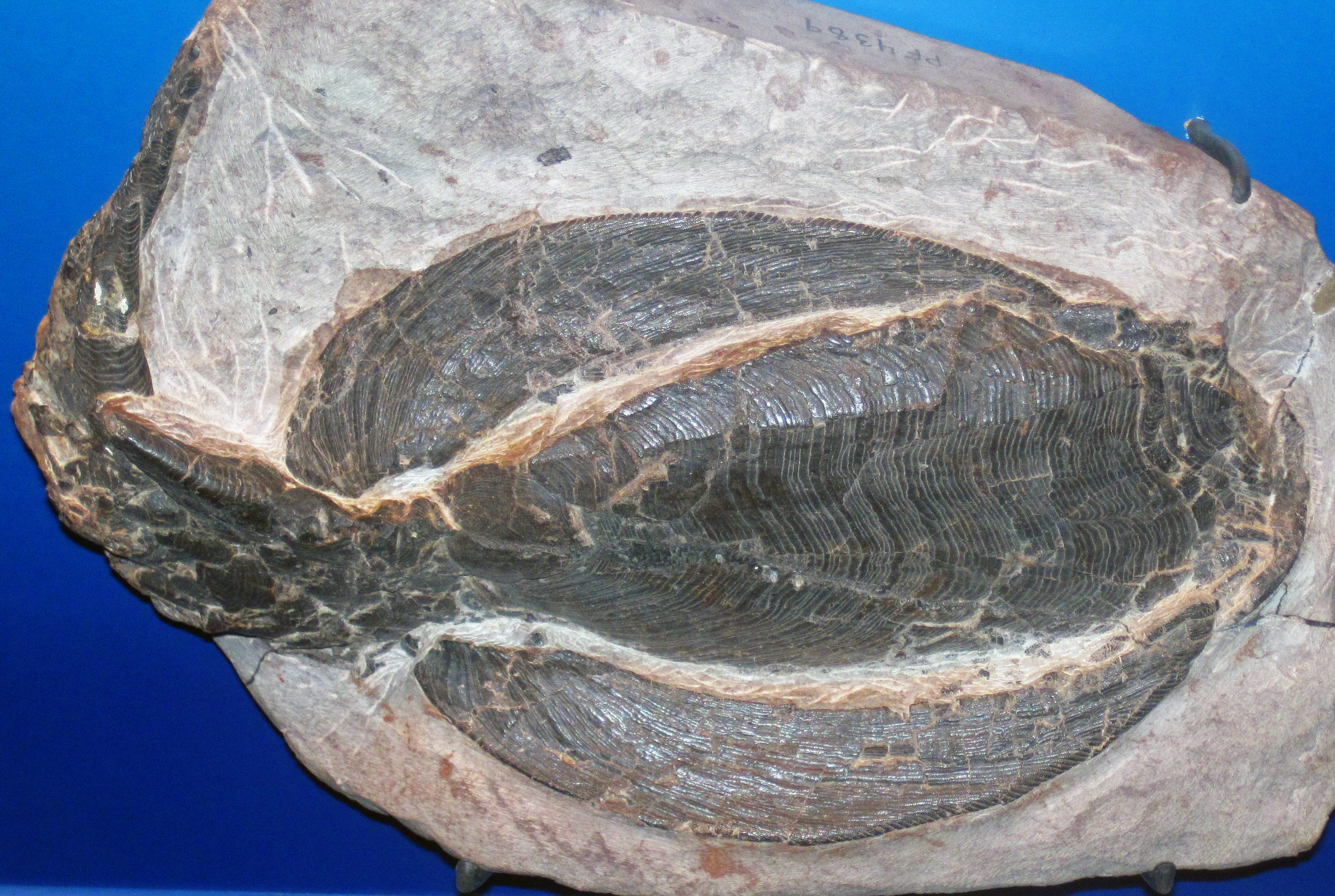
Specimen of Cosmaspis transversa, an extinct species of fish found at the Beartooth Butte Formation. Fossil fish are highly abundant in this formation.

The only known specimen of Dorfopterus was discovered on Early Devonian deposits at the Beartooth Butte Formation. The fossil in which it was preserved is a dolomitic (with dolomite) limestone mixed with clay minerals. Fossil fish recovered from the same locality were mostly preserved in phosphate while the matrix (the fine-grained material embedding crystals or fossils in a sedimentary rock) of the fossils containing plants from the same place had a coat of small carbonaceous granules, confirming that Dorfopterus' fossil was not a misidentified plant or vertebrate. Nevertheless, the fossil in which Dorfopterus was preserved has a deep red color provoked by high iron deposits coming from iron oxides. This is opposed to the dark brown to black color of the fossils in which other eurypterids such as Strobilopterus princetonii have been found in the area, which again raises doubts regarding the classification of Dorfopterus as a eurypterid.

The Beartooth Butte Formation is a geological formation extending from Wyoming to Montana (both in the United States) that is divided into several sections, some of which have great paleontological value. One of them is the section at the Beartooth Butte peak, discovered by Dorf in 1934 and aged as being Emsian (a stage of the Early Devonian). Dorf interpreted the lithology (the physical characteristics of the rocks) of the place as being proper of a non-marine, red-colored infilled channel in which rocks were deposited in quiet, shallow and estuarine (proper of an estuary, the final part of a river that joins the sea and of brackish water) conditions, with the environment possibly having been an estuarine channel. The paleoenviroment of the Beartooth Butte section had a high salinity, higher than the other sections of paleontological importance in the formation, that resembled that of marine environments. With there also being evidence for the presence of fresh water, it has been proposed that the habitat in which Dorfopterus lived was estuarine and far inland.

Dorfopterus has been found together with many other organisms, predominantly heterostracan fish but also arthrodire, osteostracan and dipnoan (lungfish) fish. There is also a fossil plant flora, which Dorf interpreted as having come from terrestrial sources. A small amount of eurypterids can also be found at the section, these being D. angusticollis, S. princetonii and Jaekelopterus howelli. Near the Beartooth Butte section, at the known as Cottonwood Canyon section, fossil scorpions (Acanthoscorpio mucronatus, Branchioscorpio richardsoni and Hydroscorpius denisoni) have been discovered. Eurypterids are present in this section as well, even in more abundance than fish, although they remain largely unstudied.

== See also ==
- List of eurypterid genera
- Timeline of eurypterid research
