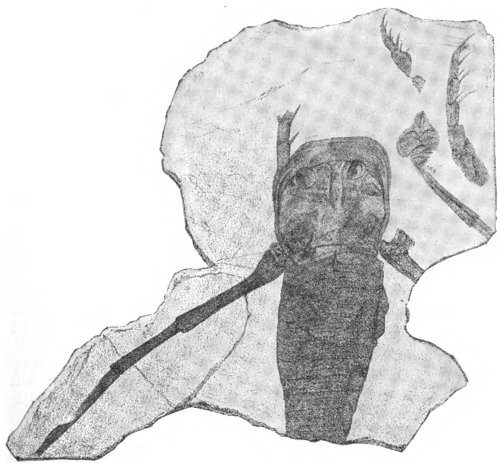
- Fossil of Stylonurella, a stylonurellid.

Scientific classification
- Kingdom: Animalia
- Phylum: Arthropoda
- Subphylum: Chelicerata
- Order: †Eurypterida
- Suborder: †Stylonurina
- Superfamily: †Stylonuroidea; Kjellesvig-Waering, 1959

Families
- †Parastylonuridae; †Stylonurellidae; †Stylonuridae

= Stylonuroidea =

Stylonuroidea Temporal range: Llandovery–Famennian

Extinct superfamily of arthropods

Stylonuroidea is an extinct superfamily of eurypterids, an extinct group of chelicerate arthropods commonly known as "sea scorpions". It is one of four superfamilies classified as part of the suborder Stylonurina.

Stylonuroidea, which lived from the Early Silurian to the Late Devonian, were characterized by their last pair of prosomal (head) appendages, which were developed as walking legs, or less commonly developed as swimming legs with paddles formed by the expansion of the two or three penultimate joints.

== Description ==
Stylonuroids are designated as stylonurines with flattened or truncated posterior metastomata margins. Of the four stylonurine superfamilies, the Stylonuroidea is the most poorly known. Whilst the topology of most stylonurine clades fit well with the stratigraphic record, Stylonuroidea is an exception in that the earliest record of the most derived genera (Ctenopterus and Laurieipterus) first appear at the same time as the earliest record of the most primitive genera (Parastylonurus and Stylonurella).

Sweep-feeding strategies evolved independently in two of the four stylonurine superfamilies, the Stylonuroidea and the Hibbertopteroidea. In both superfamilies, the adaptations to this lifestyle involves modifications to the spines on their anterior prosomal appendages for raking through the substrate of their habitats. Stylonuroids have fixed spines on appendages II-IV which could have been used as dragnets to rake through the sediments and thus entangling anything in their way.

== Systematics and genera ==
Due to the majority of specimens being incomplete, the internal topology of the Stylonuroidea is among the least well-resolved and supported in the Stylonurina and the Eurypterida at large. This is mostly due to the poor fossil record of many of the genera included within the superfamily, for instance the single known specimen of Stylonurus powriensis lacks the anterior prosomal appendages and virtually all ventral structures. Similar situations can be seen in many specimens, such as Stylonurella spinipes not preserving the metastoma or pretelson and telson and Pagea sturrocki lacking all dorsal structures.

The lack of fossil remains compounds the problem of the internal systematics. For instance, the family Parastylonuridae for long included both Parastylonurus and Stylonurella, despite being known to likely be paraphyletic. The family and genera below follow Lamsdell (2025). The subfamily Laurieipterinae, used by Lamsdell, Braddy & Tetlie (2010), is not used by Lamsdell (2025), but Ctenopterus and Laurieipterus were again recovered as sister genera.

Superfamily Stylonuroidea Kjellesvig-Waering, 1959

- Family Parastylonuridae Waterston, 1979
  - Parastylonurus Kjellesvig-Waering, 1966
- Family Stylonurellidae Lamsdell, 2025
  - Stylonurella Kjellesvig-Waering, 1966
- Family Stylonuridae Diener, 1924
  - Pagea Waterston, 1962
  - Qujingopterus Ma et al., 2025
  - Soligorskopterus Plax et al., 2018
  - Stylonurus Page, 1856
  - Subfamily Laurieipterinae Kjellesvig-Waering, 1966
    - Ctenopterus Clarke & Ruedermann, 1912
    - Laurieipterus Kjellesvig-Waering, 1966
