= Timeline of eurypterid research =

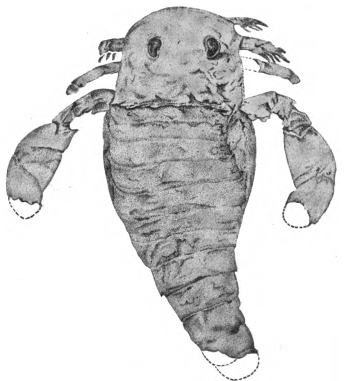
The earliest eurypterid reconstruction; a figure of Eurypterus remipes by James E. De Kay (1825).

This timeline of eurypterid research is a chronologically ordered list of important fossil discoveries, controversies of interpretation, and taxonomic revisions of eurypterids, a group of extinct aquatic arthropods closely related to modern arachnids and horseshoe crabs that lived during the Paleozoic Era.

The scientific study of eurypterids began in the early 19th century when James E. DeKay recognized a fossil that had previously been described as that of a fish as arthropod in nature. Though DeKay erroneously believed the fossil to represent a crustacean and a missing link between trilobites and branchiopods, the fossil became the type species of first ever eurypterid to be scientifically described, Eurypterus remipes, in 1825.

Over 250 species of eurypterids in 74 recognized valid genera have been described since the discovery of Eurypterus remipes. The most recent genus to be described is Terropterus (2021) and the most recent species is its type species Terropterus xiushanensis (2021).

== 19th century ==
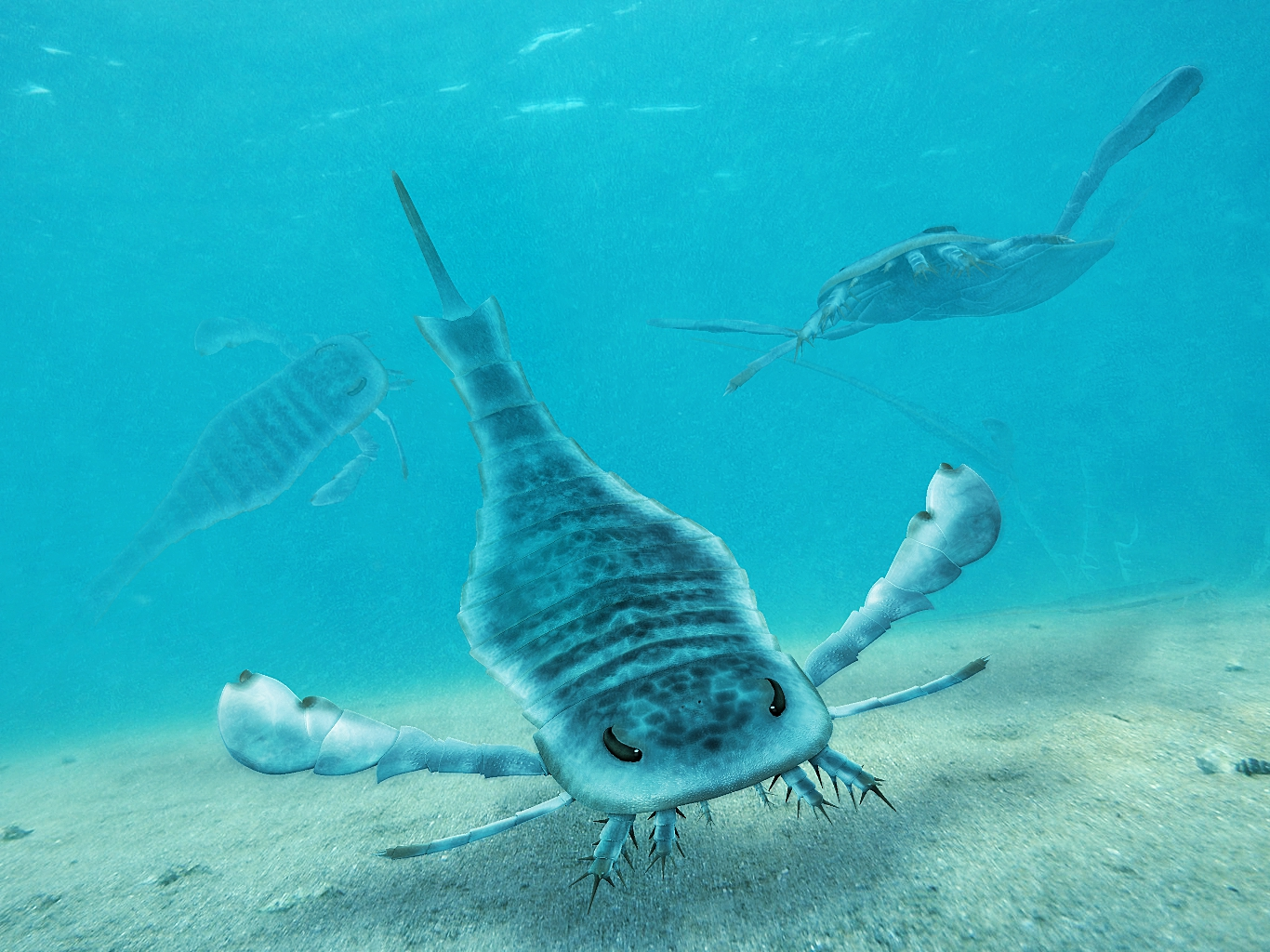
Reconstruction of Eurypterus. Eurypterus was the first eurypterid to be described.

=== 1810s ===
==== 1818 ====
- The first eurypterid fossil to be discovered is unearthed in rocks in New York of Silurian age. It is described by Dr. S. L. Mitchill as an example of the fish Silurus, possibly due to the catfish-like appearance of its carapace.

=== 1820s ===
==== 1825 ====
- James E. DeKay recognized the fossil described by Mitchill as an arthropod and named it Eurypterus remipes, the first eurypterid to be described scientifically. DeKay interpreted the animal as a crustacean and as the missing link between trilobites and branchiopods.

=== 1830s ===
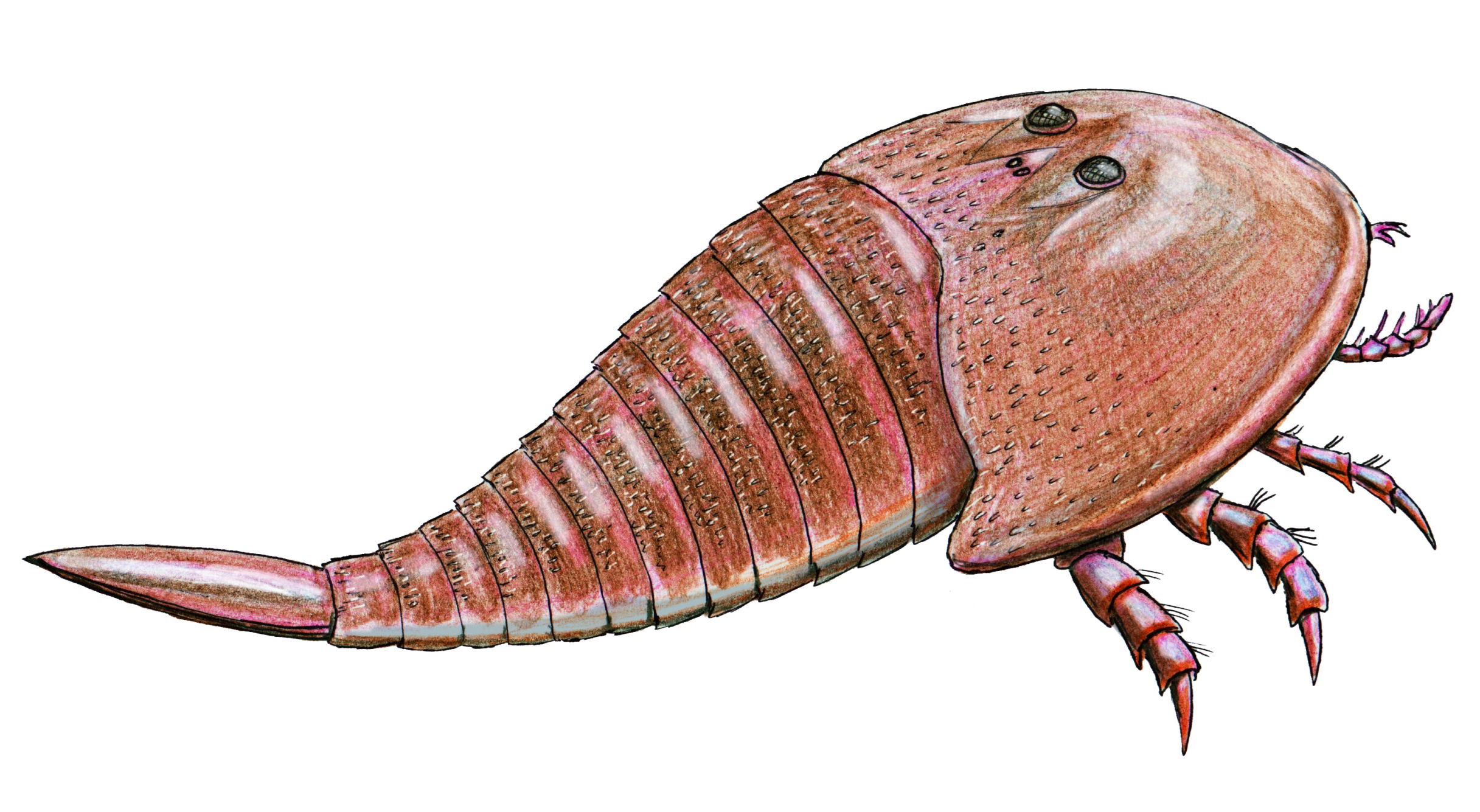
Reconstruction of Hibbertopterus scouleri. Fossils of Hibbertopterus were first discovered in 1831.

==== 1831 ====
- John Scouler examines and figures fossil remains from Lower Carboniferous Scotland which will later be referred to Hibbertopterus scouleri.
- Scouler described the genus Eidothea based on a single fossil without designating a species name.

==== 1836 ====
- Samuel Hibbert describes the species Eurypterus scouleri, later transferred to its own genus, Hibbertopterus.
- Scouler's Eidothea is discovered to be pre-occupied by a genus of plant, his fossil is found to be similar to Eurypterus scouleri.

==== 1838 ====
- Stepan S. Kutorga described the species Limulus oculatus as an extinct horseshoe crab.

==== 1839 ====
- Louis Agassiz described the new genus Pterygotus, believing the fossils to represent a large fish.

=== 1840s ===
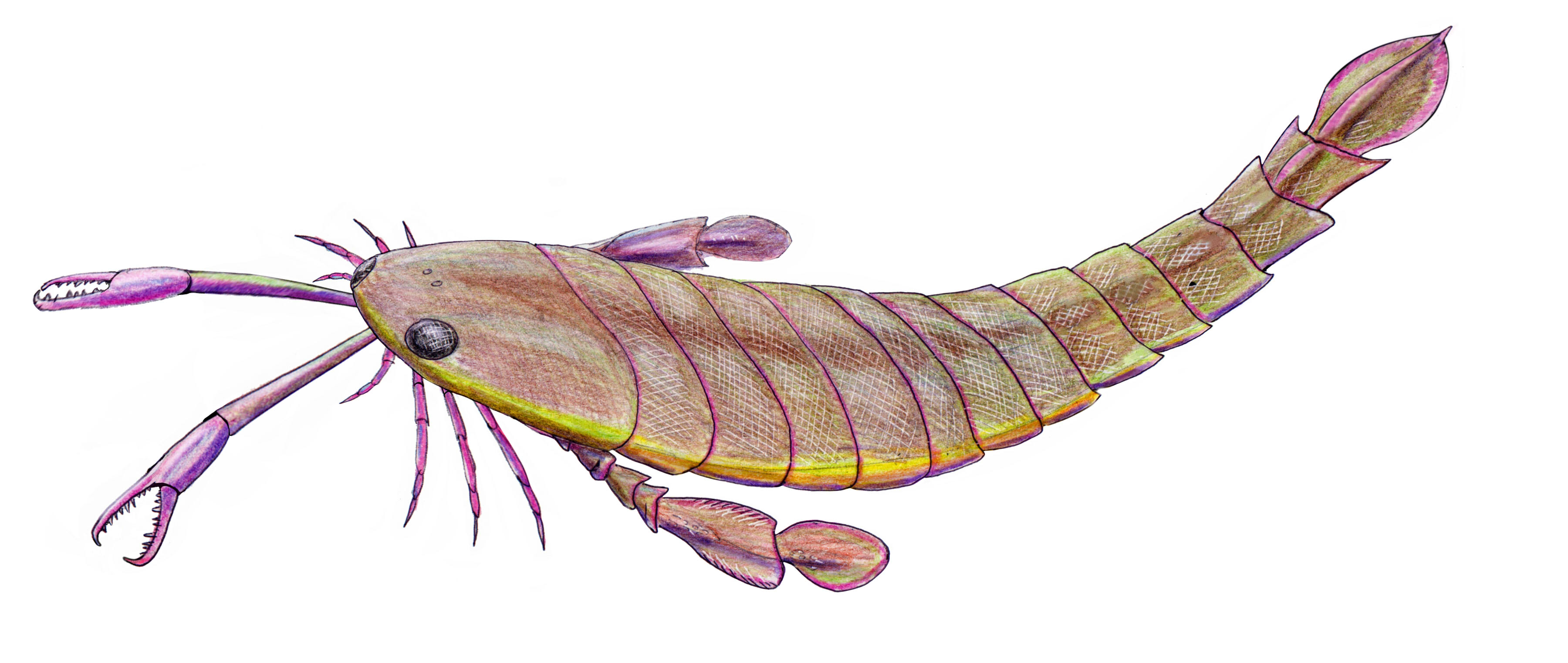
Reconstruction of Pterygotus anglicus. Pterygotus was described in 1839 and its fossils were first thought to be fossils of fish.

==== 1843 ====
- Burmeister created the family Eurypteridae to contain Eurypterus.

==== 1844 ====
- Agassiz recognized Pterygotus as an arthropod after the discovery of more complete remains, he classified it as a crustacean of the Entomostraca subclass.

==== 1849 ====
- Agassiz described the species Pterygotus anglicus.

=== 1850s ===
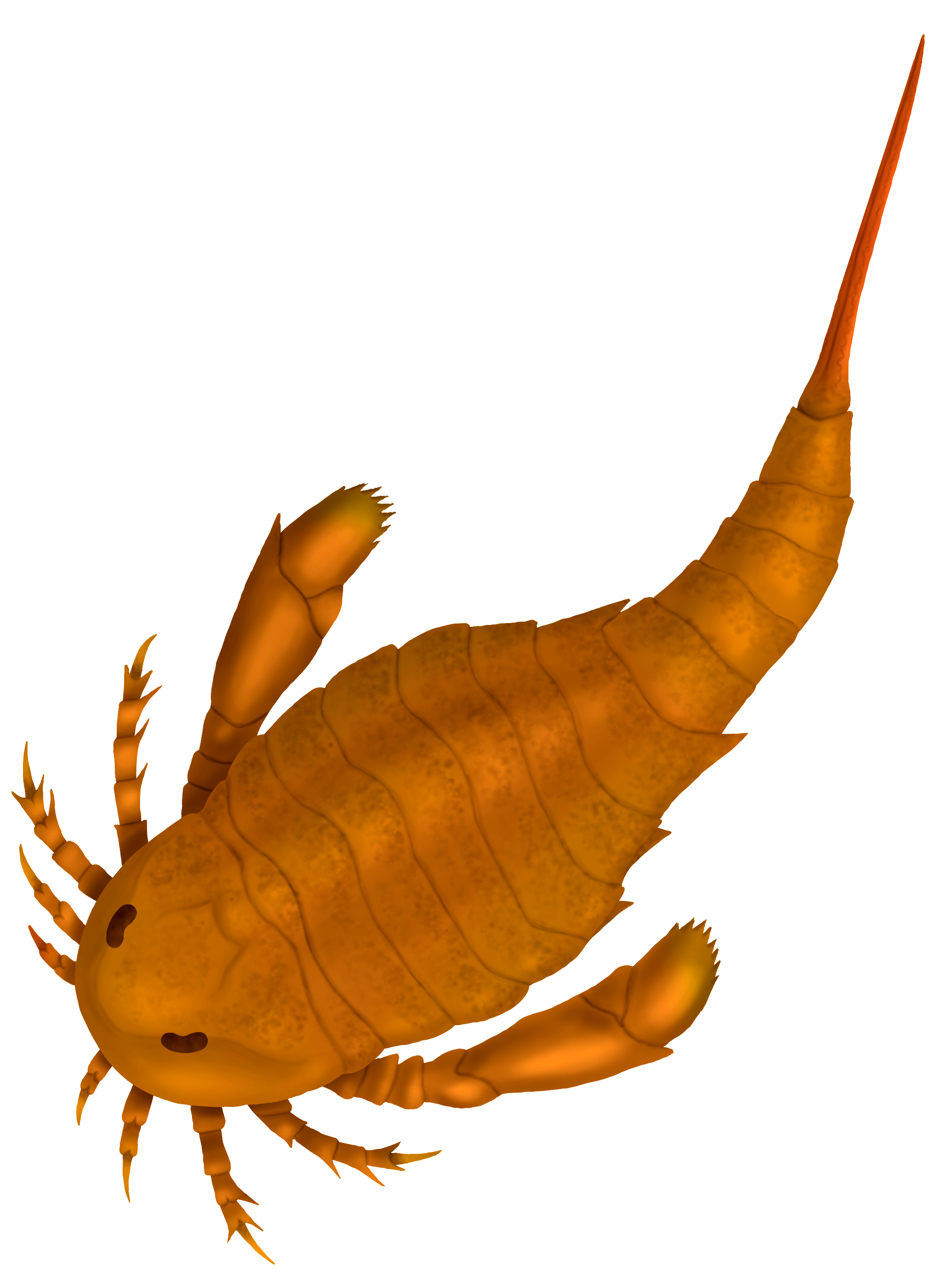
Reconstruction of Adelophthalmus. Adelophthalmus was first described in 1854 and has had a complicated taxonomic history ever since.

==== 1851 ====
- Hermann Jordan excavates the first fossils of the genus Adelophthalmus.

==== 1852 ====
- John William Salter described the species Pterygotus problematicus.

==== 1854 ====
- Jordan and Hermann von Meyer describe the new species and genus Adelophthalmus granosus.

==== 1855 ====
- August Emanuel von Reuss described the new species and genus Lepidoderma imhofi.

==== 1856 ====
- Salter described the new genus Himantopterus (the genus name was replaced in 1859 by Erettopterus) and the new species H. acuminatus, H. banksii, H. bilobus, H. lanceolatus, H. maximus and H. perornatus.
- Salter described the species Pterygotus acuminata.
- Page transferred Pterygotus acuminata to its own genus, Slimonia.
- Page named and figured, but did not thoroughly describe, the genus Stylonurus.

==== 1859 ====
- Hall describes the species Pterygotus marcophthalmus. It will later be considered part of the genus Acutiramus.
- Hall describes the species Pterygotus osborni.
- Hall describes the species Pterygotus cobbi.
- Salter names a subgenus of Pterygotus, Erettopterus, for species with a bilobed telson.
- Salter described the species Slimonia stylops.
- Salter described the species Eurypterus abbreviatus.
- Salter described the species Pterygotus ludensis.
- Salter described the species Pterygotus punctatus.
- Salter described the species Eurypterus pygmaeus, later recognized as representing fossils of Nanahughmilleria.
- Salter and Thomas Henry Huxley describe the fossil specimens that will later be named Necrogammarus salweyi, believing them to represent some sort of crustacean.

=== 1860s ===
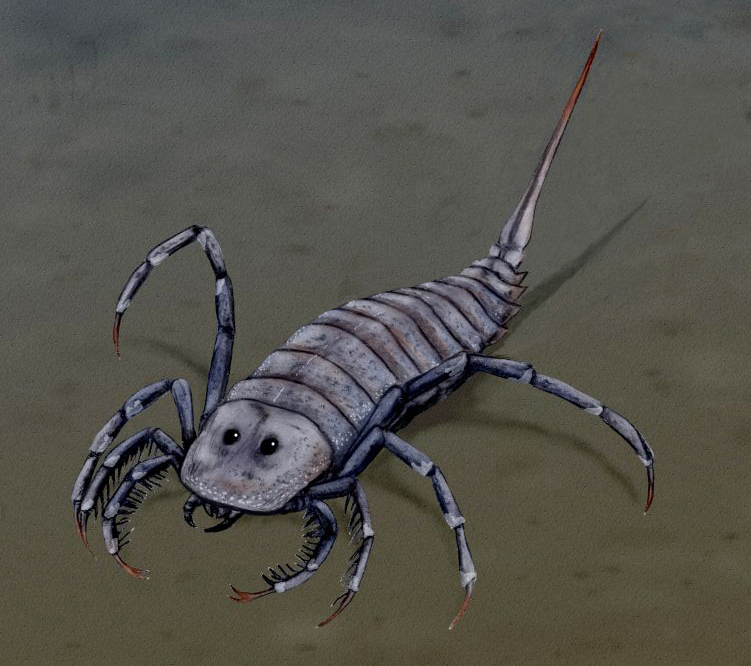
Reconstruction of Stylonurus powriensis. Though first named in 1856, Stylonurus was not thoroughly described until 1865.

==== 1860 ====
- Edouard D'Eichwald recognized Kutorga's Limulus oculatus to be highly distinct from Limulus and created the generic name Campylocephalus to contain the species.

==== 1861 ====
- John William Dawson named a new species of plant, Selaginites formosus.

==== 1865 ====
- Henry Woodward described the genus Stylonurus (named and figured, but not thoroughly described, by David Page in 1856) and raised the rank of the Eurypteridae to that of order, effectively creating the Eurypterida as the taxonomic unit it is seen as today.

==== 1866 ====
- Woodward created the subclass Merostomata to contain eurypterids and xiphosurans.
- Ernst Haeckel classified the Merostomata (containing virtually only the Eurypterida) and Xiphosura within a group he named Gigantostraca within the crustaceans. "Gigantostraca" is later treated as a synonym of Mersostomata.

==== 1868 ====
- Salter described the species Pterygotus taurinus.
- Woodward described the species Eurypterus obesus.
- Woodward described the species Eurypterus scorpioides.
- Fielding Bradford Meek and Amos Henry Worthen described the new species and genus Anthraconectes mazonensis. Anthraconectes was designated a subgenus of Eurypterus.

=== 1870s ===
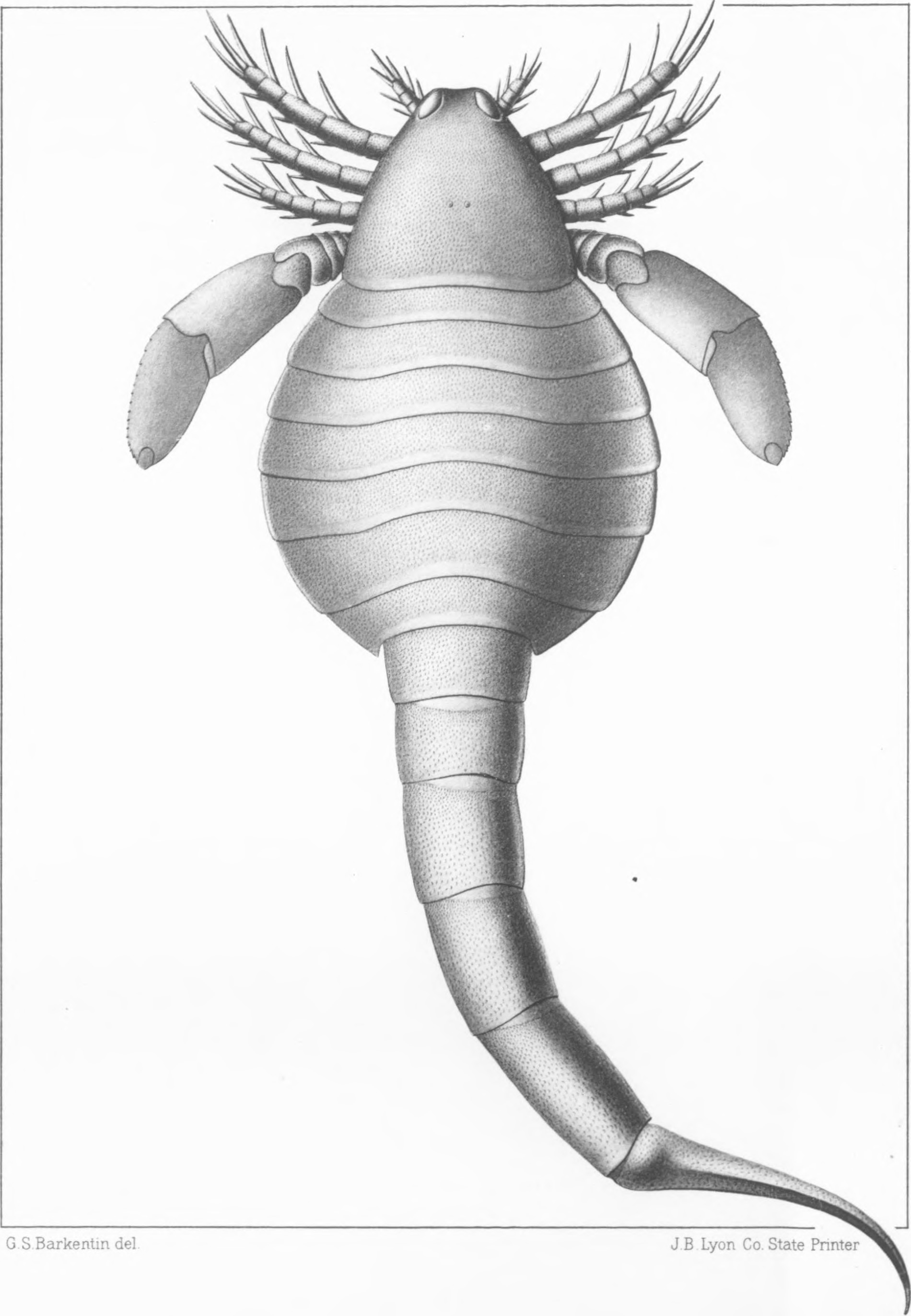
Reconstruction of Eusarcana scorpionis, first named in 1875 under the name Eusarcus.

==== 1870 ====
- Henry Woodward described the species Necrogammarus salweyi, believing it to represent an amphipod.

==== 1871 ====
- Dawson reclassified his plant Selaginites formosus as a eurypterid.

==== 1872 ====
- Barrande describes Pterygotus bohemicus, later considered part of the genus Acutiramus, P. kopaninensis and P. nobilis.
- Walcott described the genus and species Echinognathus clevelandi.

==== 1873 ====
- Friedrich Goldenberg coined the name Polyzosternites to replace Adelophthalmus.

==== 1874 ====
- Samuel Almond Miller described the new genus and species Megalograptus welchi, mistakenly believing the fragmentary fossils to represent a graptolite.

==== 1875 ====
- Grote and Pitt describe Pterygotus cummingsi, later considered the type species of Acutiramus.
- Grote and Pitt describe the species Eusarcus scorpionis.

==== 1877 ====
- Dionýs Štúr described the species Eurypterus salmi, later referred to Campylocephalus.
- Meek and Worthen described the species Eurypterus pennsylvanicus, later referred to Adelophthalmus.
- Hall described the species Eurypterus mansfieldi, later referred to Adelophthalmus.

==== 1879 ====
- John William Dawson described the species Erettopterus canadensis.

=== 1880s ===
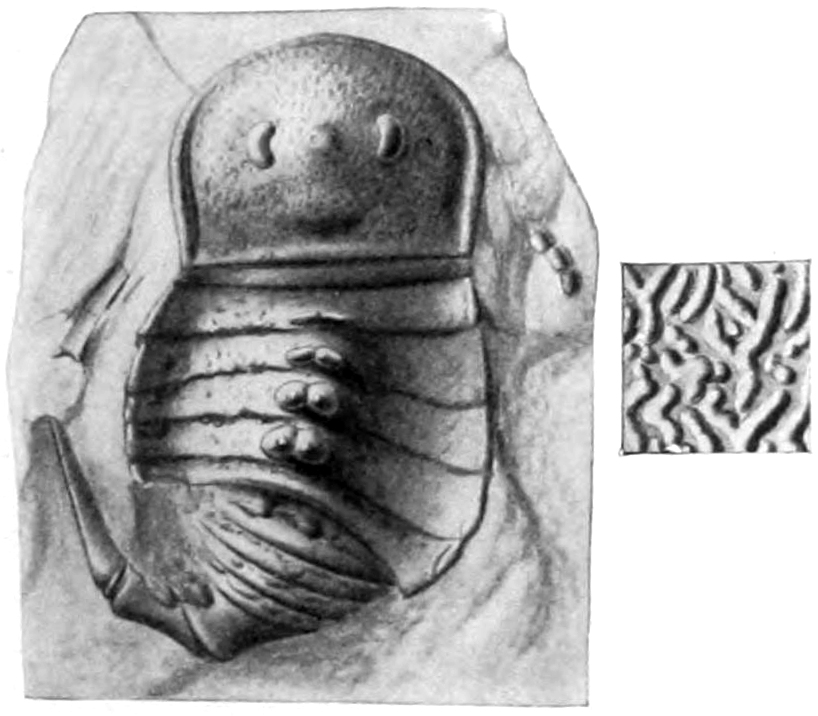
Fossil of Tylopterella boyleyi. T. boyleyi was first described in 1884 and was for many years considered to be a species of Eurypterus.

==== 1881 ====
- Pohlman described the species Pterygotus buffaloensis. It is later synonymized with P. cummingsi.
- Pohlman described the species Erettopterus grandis.
- The type and only known specimen of Tylopterella boylei (first named Eurypterus boylei) is discovered.

==== 1882 ====
- Ben Peach named the genus Glyptoscorpius to include some fossils from the Carboniferous of Scotland, including the species G. perornatus, G. caledonicus and G. kidstoni. He mistakenly believed the fossils to represent the remains of scorpions.

==== 1883 ====
- Carl Friedrich Schmidt described the species Erettopterus osiliensis.

==== 1884 ====
- The holotype and only known specimen of Vernonopterus minutisculptus is discovered.
- Joseph Frederick Whiteaves described the species Eurypterus boylei.
- Hall described the species Eurypterus prominens.

==== 1888 ====
- Hall and Clarke described the species Eurypterus approximatus, later referred to Adelophthalmus.
- Woodward described the species Eurypterus wilsoni, later referred to Adelophthalmus.

==== 1889 ====
- Matthew described the new genus and species Bunodella horrida as a crustacean.
- Dewalque described the species Eurypterus lohesti.

=== 1890s ===
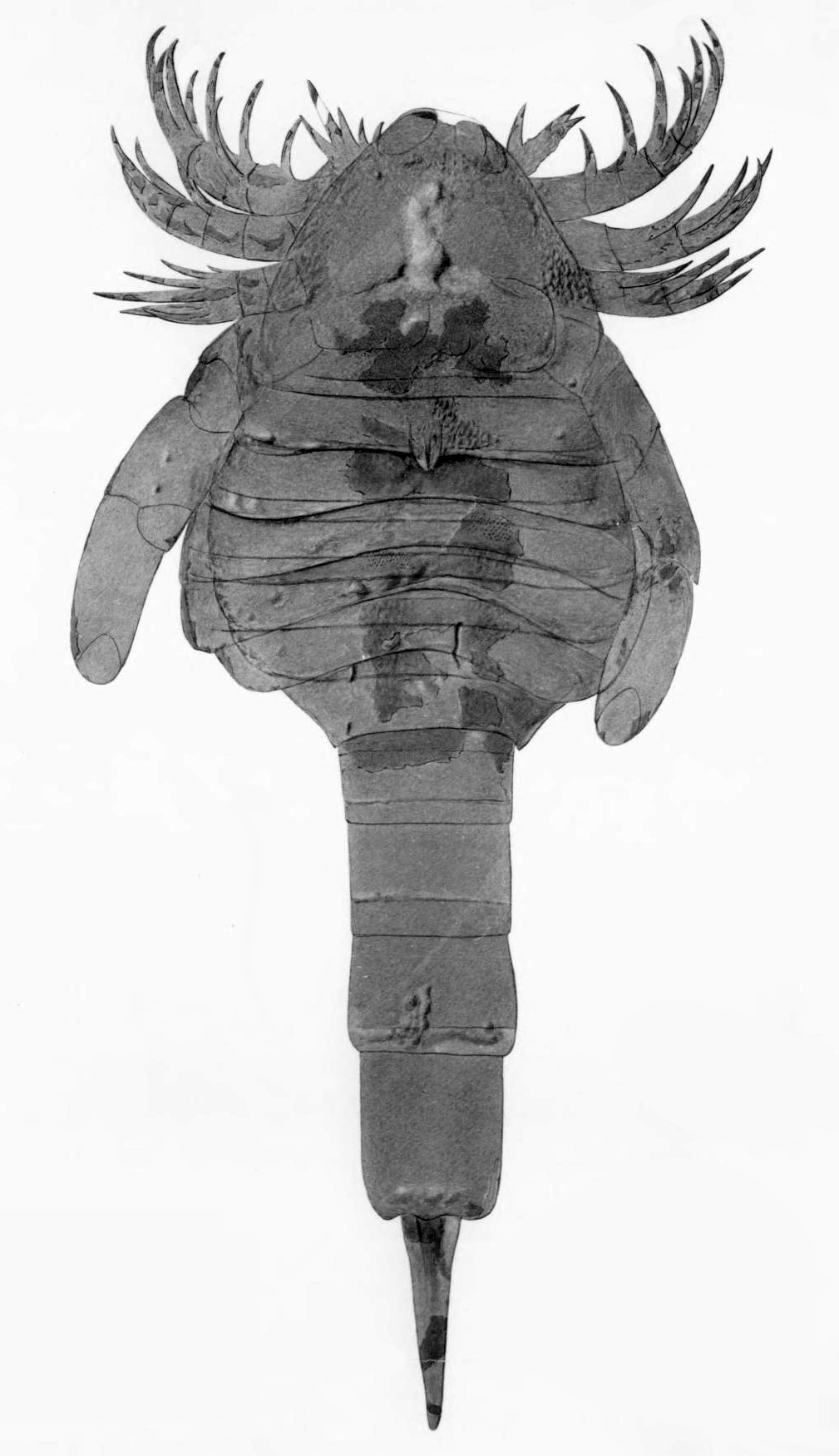
Fossil of Carcinosoma newlini. Carcinosoma was coined as a replacement name for the preoccupied name Eurysoma in 1890, the same year its type species was described.

==== 1890 ====
- Edward Waller Claypole described the genus and species Eurysoma newlini. Later that same year he discovered Eurysoma to be pre-occupied, and coined the replacement name Carcinosoma.
- Pereira de Lima described the species Eurypterus douvillei, later referred to Adelophthalmus.

==== 1893 ====
- In the work Anatomy and Relations of the Eurypterida (1893), Malcolm Laurie added considerably to the knowledge and discussion of eurypterid anatomy and relations. He focused on how the eurypterids related to each other and to trilobites, crustaceans, scorpions, other arachnids and horseshoe crabs.

==== 1896 ====
- Gerhard Holm described the species Eurypterus fischeri. His description was so elaborate that the species became one of the most completely known of all extinct animals, so much so that the knowledge of E. fischeri was comparable with the knowledge of its modern relatives (such as the Atlantic horseshoe crab). The description also helped solidify the close relationship between the eurypterids and other chelicerates by showcasing numerous homologies between the two groups.
- Samuel Almond Miller and William Frank Eugene Gurley described the species Eurypterus kokomoensis, later considered the type species of the genus Onychopterella.

==== 1898 ====
- Semper described the species Pterygotus barrandei and Eurypterus acrocephalus.

==== 1899 ====
- Laurie described the species Slimonia dubia.
- Laurie described the species Eurypterus scoticus.
- McCoy described the species Pterygotus australis, the first eurypterid known from Australia.
- Fraipont described the species Eurypterus dewalquei.

== 20th century ==
=== 1900s ===
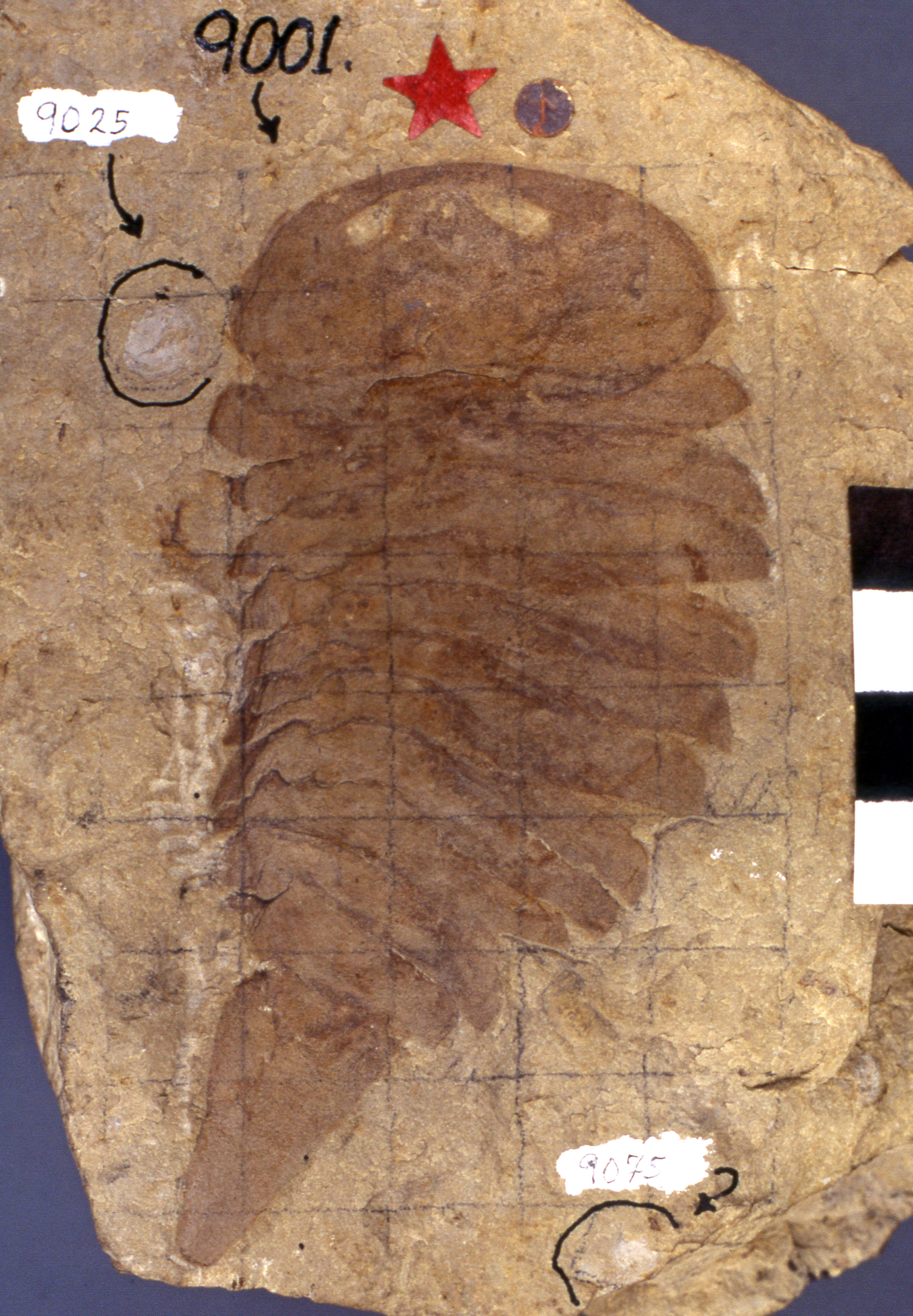
Fossil of Strabops thatcheri, once thought to represent the oldest eurypterid but today recognized as a strabopid.

==== 1901 ====
- Charles Emerson Beecher described the new genus and species Strabops thacheri as the only Cambrian eurypterid.

==== 1902 ====
- Sarle described the species Pterygotus monroensis.

==== 1903 ====
- Clifton J. Sarle described the new species Pterygotus monroensis and Eurypterus pittsfordensis. The new genus and species Hughmilleria socialis with the variety H. socialis var. robusta is also described.

==== 1905 ====
- Peach described the new species Glyptoscorpius minutisculptus.

==== 1907 ====
- John Mason Clarke described the new species Pterygotus otisius, Hughmilleria shawangunk, Eurypterus maria, E. myops, E. cicerops and E. cestrotus.
- Woodward described the species Eurypterus moyseyi, later referred to Adelophthalmus.

==== 1908 ====
- Ruedemann recognizes that Megalograptus is an eurypterid, rather than a graptolite.

=== 1910s ===
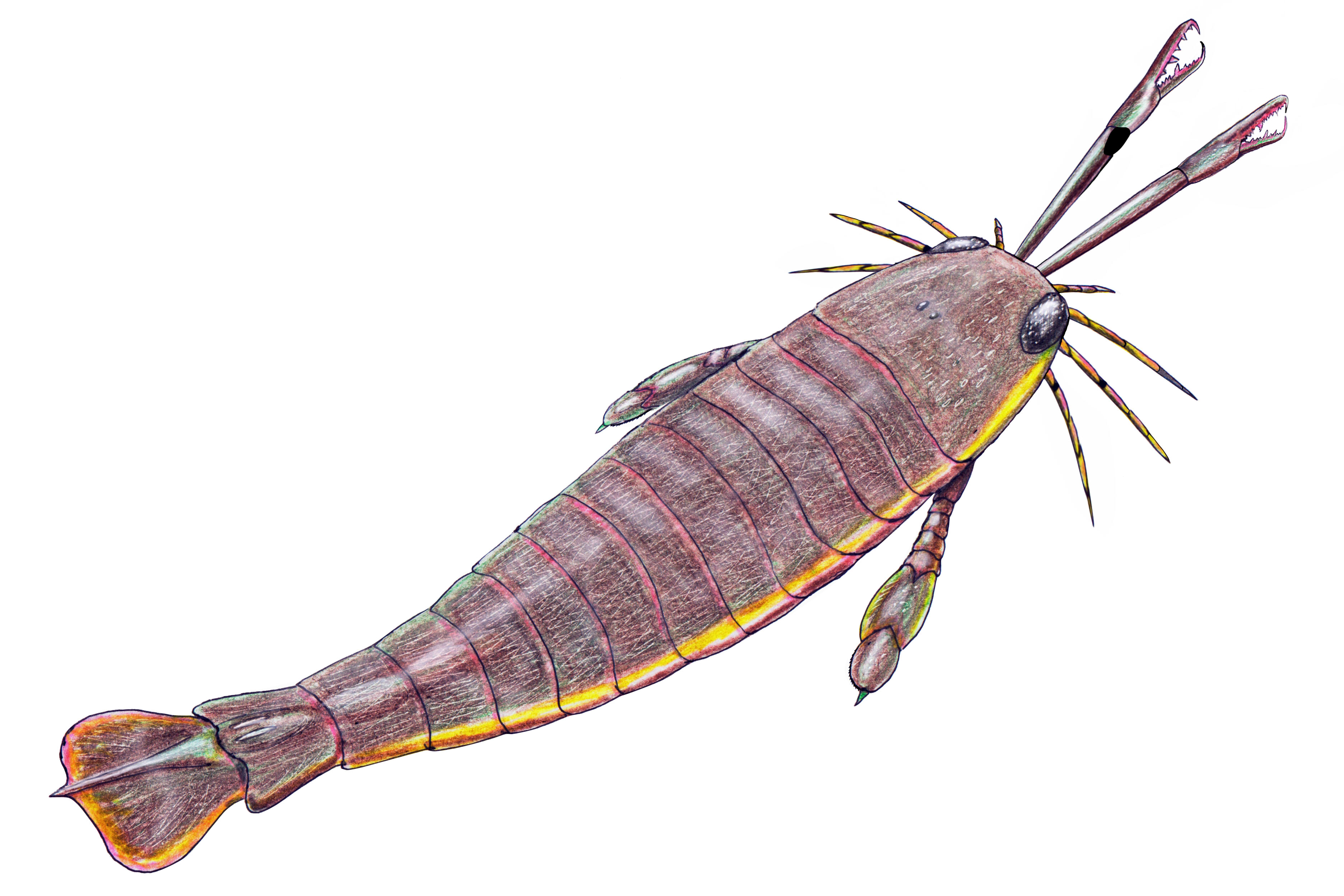
Reconstruction of Jaekelopterus rhenaniae. Initially described as a species of Pterygotus in 1914, Jaekelopterus rhenaniae is the largest known eurypterid.

==== 1911 ====
- Johan Aschehoug Kiær described the species Eurypterus norvegica.

==== 1912 ====
- Ruedemann and Clarke publish The Eurypterida of New York, wherein several new speciesand taxonomic groupings are created. New species described are Eurypterus megalops, Eurypterus pristinus, Eurypterus ranilarva, Eurypterus stellatus, Eusarcus longiceps, Eusarcus triangulatus, Eusarcus vaningeni, Dolichopterus frankfortensis, Dolichopterus latifrons, Dolichopterus siluriceps, Dolichopterus testudineus, Dolichopterus stylonuroides, Stylonurus limbatus, Ctenopterus multispinosus, Drepanopterus longicaudatus, Hughmilleria magna, Pterygotus atlanticus, Erettopterus globiceps, Pterygotus nasatus and Pterygotus prolificus. They also name the genus Tylopterus (later Tylopterella) and the family Pterygotidae. There are also numerous taxonomic revisions. Eurypterus obesus and E. acrocephalus are referred to the genus Eusarcus. The genus Carcinosoma, to which the species Eurypterus scorpioides and Eurypterus scoticus are transferred, is designated as a junior synonym of Eusarcus. The species Eurypterus kokomoensis is raised to the subgeneric level under the subgenus name Onychopterus.

==== 1914 ====
- Otto Jaekel described the new species Pterygotus rhenaniae, later designated as the type species of Jaekelopterus.
- Erwin H. Barbour described the new species Anthraconectes nebraskensis. The discovery helped reinforce the idea as Adelophthalmus (or Anthraconectes) as a freshwater animal.

==== 1915 ====
- Xavier Stainier described the species Eurypterus dumonti, later referred to Adelophthalmus.
- Ellis W. Shuler described the species Stylonurus (Ctenopterus) alveolatus, later referred to Megalograptus.

==== 1916 ====
- Thomas Edmund Savage described the species Eurypterus pumilus.

=== 1920s ===
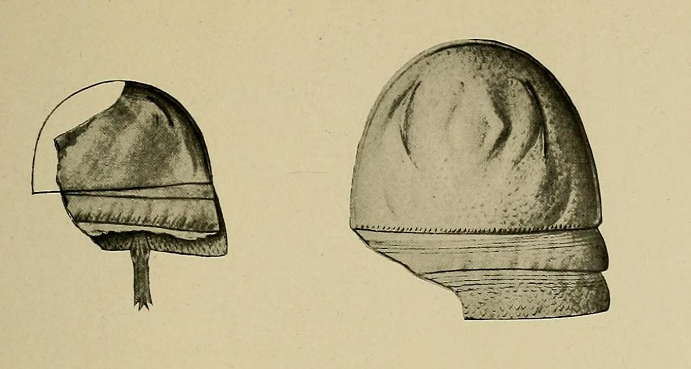
The holotype (right) and paratype (left) of Pittsfordipterus phelpsae. Fossils of the species were first described in 1921 and assigned to the genus Hughmilleria.

==== 1920 ====
- Amadeus William Grabau described the species Anthraconectes chinensis.

==== 1921 ====
- Ruedemann described the new species Pterygotus vernonensis.
- Ruedemann described the species Hughmilleria phelpsae, later designated as the type species of Pittsfordipterus.

==== 1922 ====
- Walter A. Bell described the species Anthraconectes brasdorensis.

==== 1924 ====
- Carl Owen Dunbar described the species Anthraconectes sellardsi.

==== 1926 ====
- Embrik Strand described the species Pterygotus siemiradzkii.

=== 1930s ===
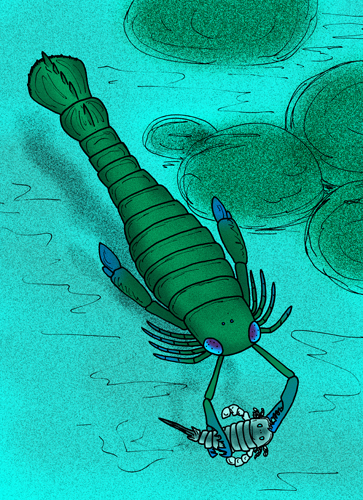
Reconstruction of Acutiramus cummingsi. Acutiramus was created as a subgenus of Pterygotus in 1936.

==== 1933 ====
- Boris Isidorovich Chernyshev described the species Eurypterus carbonarius, later referred to Adelophthalmus.

==== 1934 ====
- Eusarcus is recognized as a pre-occupied name by Størmer, who transfers its species to the next oldest available name, Carcinosoma.
- Størmer describes the species Hughmilleria patteni.

==== 1935 ====
- Ruedemann names new subgenera of Pterygotus: Curviramus and Acutiramus. They are differentiated by the curvature of denticles in their chelicerae.

==== 1936 ====
- Størmer provides a more comprehensive and detailed description of Pterygotus rhenaniae.
- Etheridge, Jr. described the species Glyptoscorpius stevensoni.

==== 1938 ====
- Carl E. Decker described the species Anthraconectes oklahomensis.

==== 1939 ====
- Gilbert Oscar Raasch referred Strabops to the order Aglaspida.
- Roy Woodhouse Pocock and A. J. Butler discover a relatively complete telson of Eurypterus abbreviatus, showing that the species was highly distinct from other species referred to the genus.
- Pruvost described the species Anthraconectes corneti.

=== 1940s ===
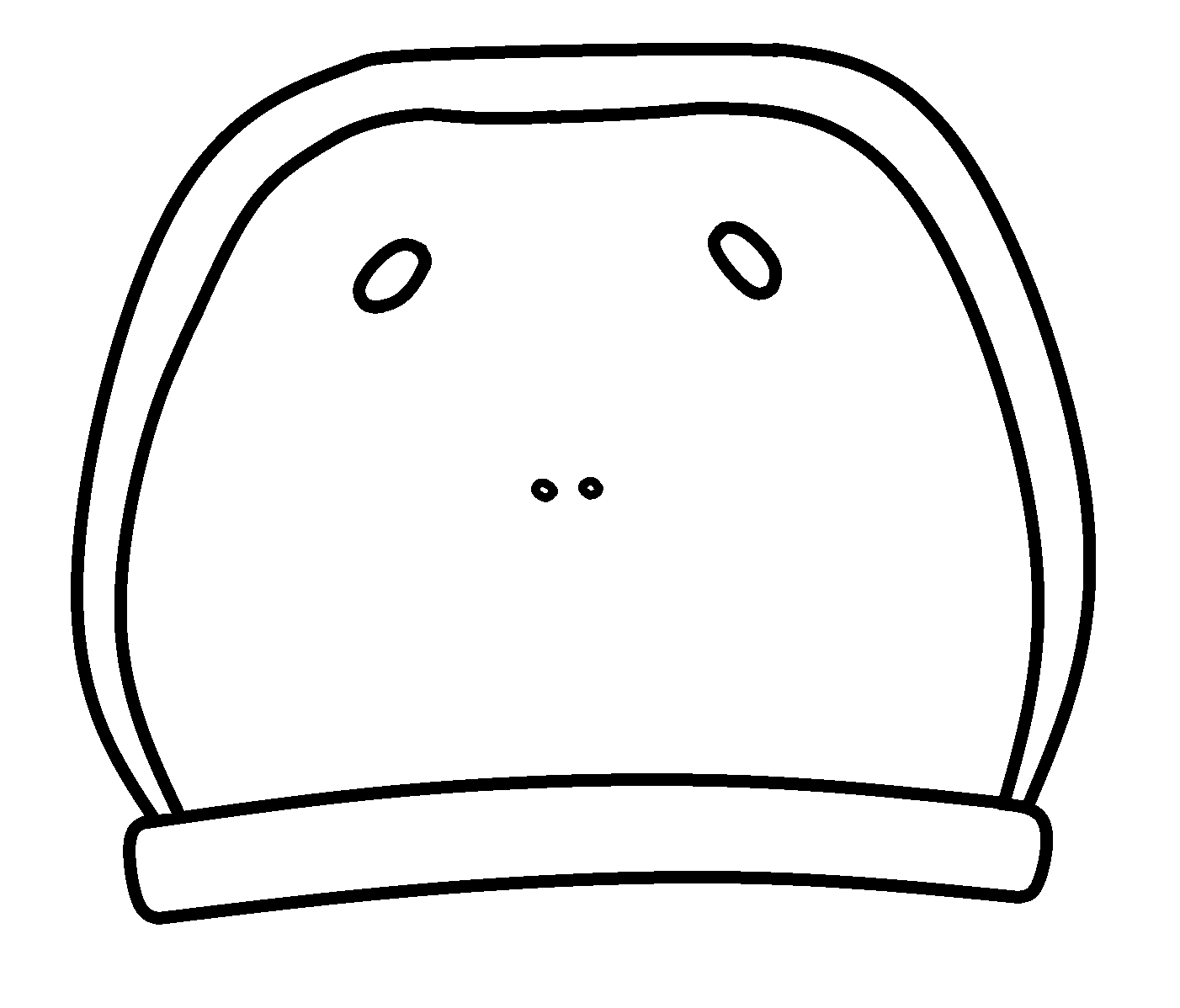
Carapace of Unionopterus anastasiae. Unionopterus was first described in 1948 and its precise taxonomical position remains unclear.

==== 1942 ====
- Strand proposes the replacement name Eusarcana for Eusarcus but it is ignored since Carcinosoma is already in use as the replacement name.

==== 1948 ====
- Kjellesvig-Waering described the new species Pterygotus ventricosus, later considered the type species of Ciurcopterus.
- Kjellesvig-Waering raised the subgenus Onychopterus to the rank of a separate genus. He also assigned the species Eurypterus pumilus to the genus.
- Boris Isidorovich Chernyshev described the new species Unionopterus anastasiae.

=== 1950s ===
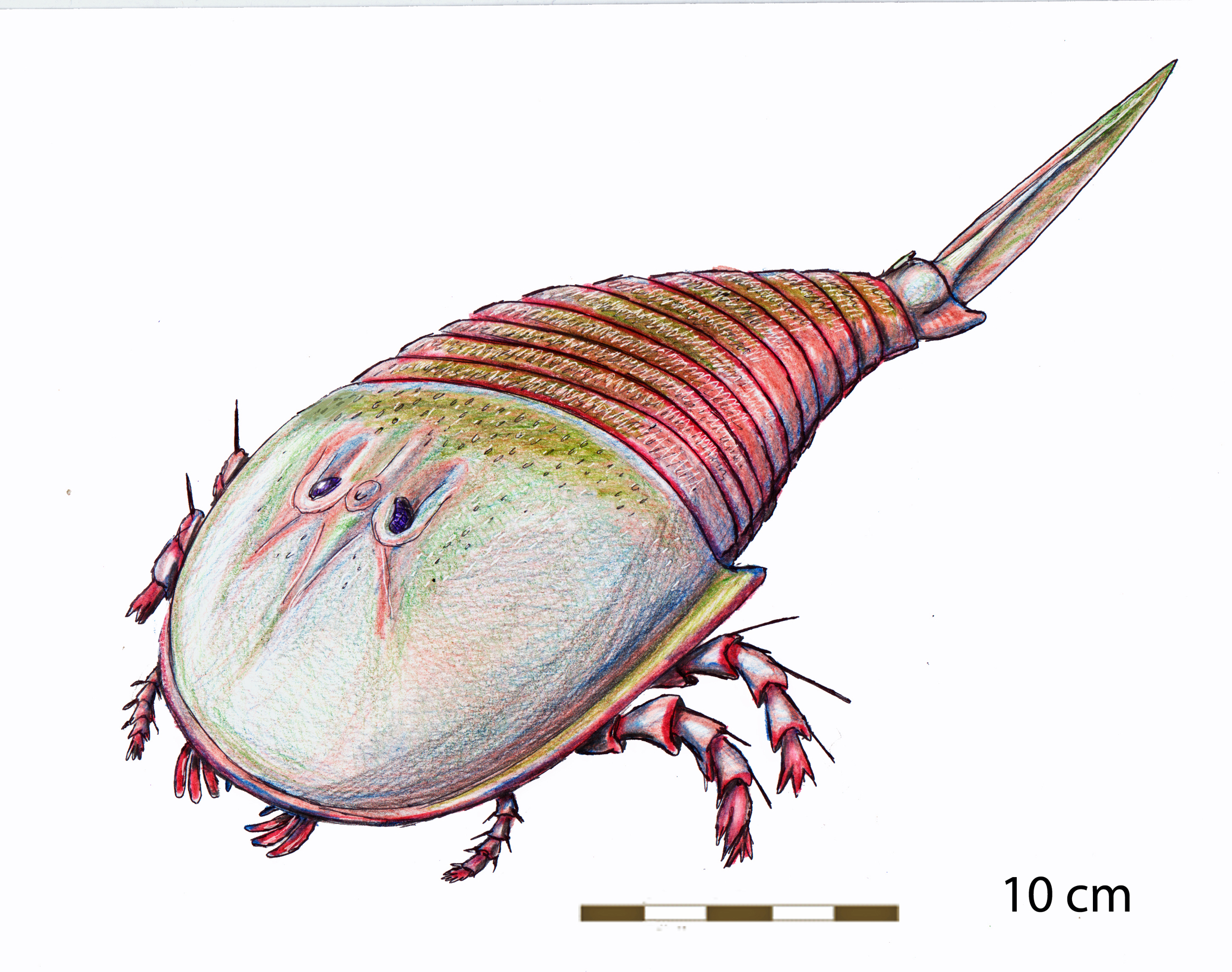
Reconstruction of Campylocephalus. Throughout the 1950s, several studies centered on whether or not Campylocephalus was synonymous with Hibbertopterus.

==== 1950 ====
- Kjellesvig-Waering described the new species Hughmilleria bellistriata.
- Kjellesvig-Waering described the new species Pterygotus floridanus.

==== 1951 ====
- Kjellesvig-Waering described the new family Hughmilleriidae, composed of Hughmilleria, Slimonia, Grossopterus, Lepidoderma, Hastimima and the new genus Salteropterus abbreviatus (formerly a species of Eurypterus), leaving the Pterygotidae monotypic.
- Størmer concluded that Campylocephalus and Hibbertopterus were congeneric. The fossils that had been referred to Ediothea were recognized as representatives of Campylocephalus.
- Størmer noted that the name Onychopterus was pre-occupied and coined the replacement name Onychopterella.
- Kjellesvig-Waering coined the replacement name Tylopterella for the genus Tylopterus, as the name Tylopterus was found to be preoccupied.
- Augusta and Pribyl described the species Ctenopterus ostraviensis.

==== 1952 ====
- Přibyl described the species Anthraconectes zadrai.

==== 1953 ====
- Russell described the new species Pterygotus gaspesiensis.

==== 1955 ====
- Kjellesvig-Waering describes the new genus and species Dorfopterus angusticollis as part of Stylonuridae.
- Kjellesvig-Waering and Caster describe the species Acutiramus floweri.
- Kjellesvig-Waering describes the species Acutiramus suwanneensis.
- Kjellesvig-Waering and Caster revise the genus Megalograptus after more complete fossils are recovered of a new species, M. ohioensis.

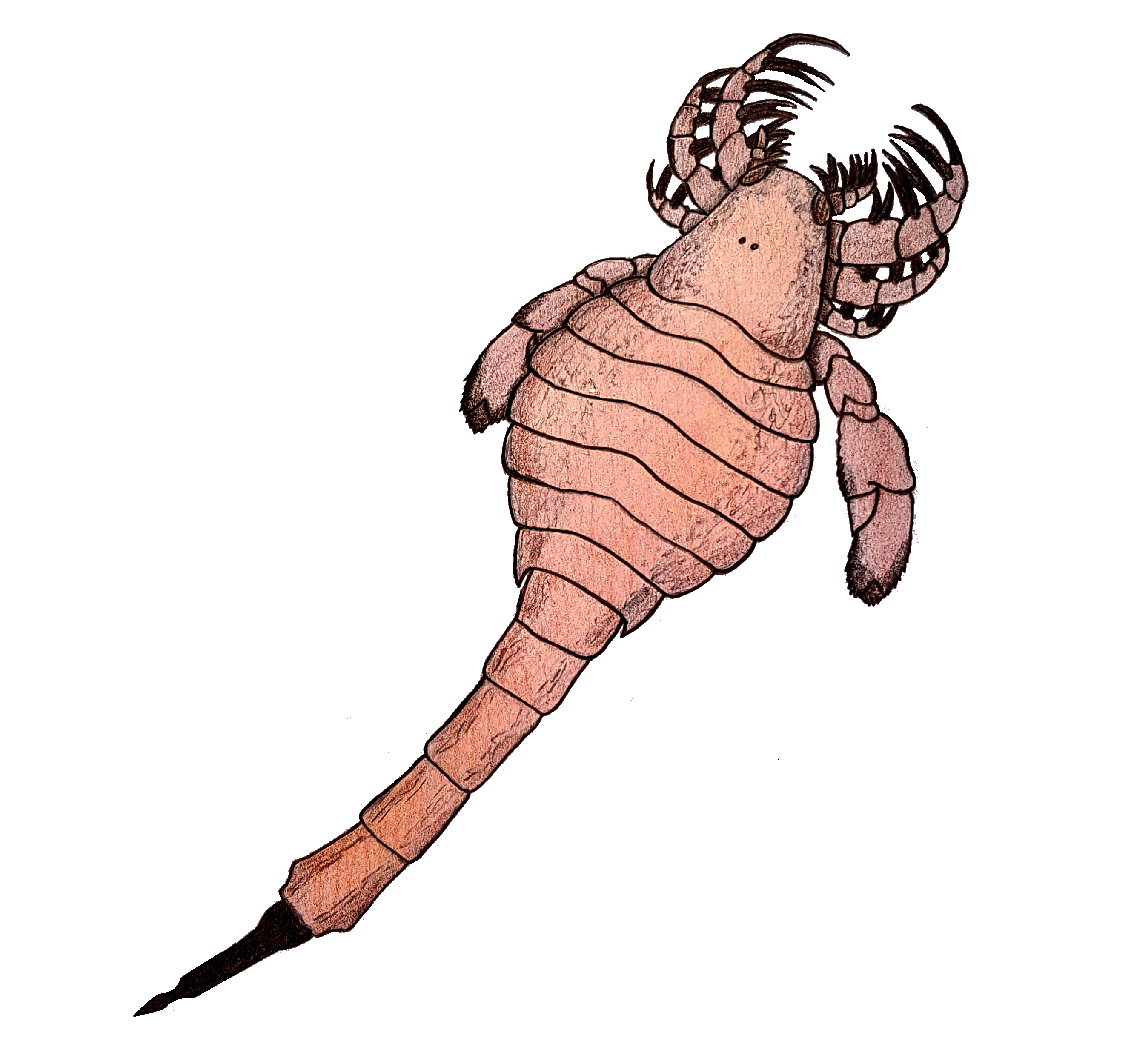
Reconstruction of Carcinosoma newlini with coloration inferred by Kjellesvig-Waering in 1958.

==== 1956 ====
- Fredrik Herman van Oyen designate Anthraconectes, Glyptoscorpius, Lepidoderma and Polyzosternites as junior synonyms of Adelophthalmus.

==== 1957 ====
- Pirozhnikov described two new species, Rhenopterus matarakensis and R. schiraensis.
- Kjellesvig-Waering and Størmer describe the new species Pterygotus howelli, which would later be assigned to Jaekelopterus.
- Waterston gives a more complete description of Glyptoscorpius minutisculptus and refers it to Eurypterus as Eurypterus minutisculptus.

==== 1958 ====
- Kjellesvig-Waering reaffirmed the status of Tylopterella as a separate genus from Eurypterus.
- Kjellesvig-Waering publishes a study which determines the coloration of Carcinosoma newlini; showing that it was light brown with darker scales and appendages and a black telson and spines.

==== 1959 ====
- Kjellesvig-Waering recognized Campylocephalus as being distinct from Eurypterus scouleri and erected the genus Hibbertopterus to contain E. scouleri.
- Adelophthalmus oklahomensis is designated a junior synonym of Adelophthalmus sellardsi.

=== 1960s ===
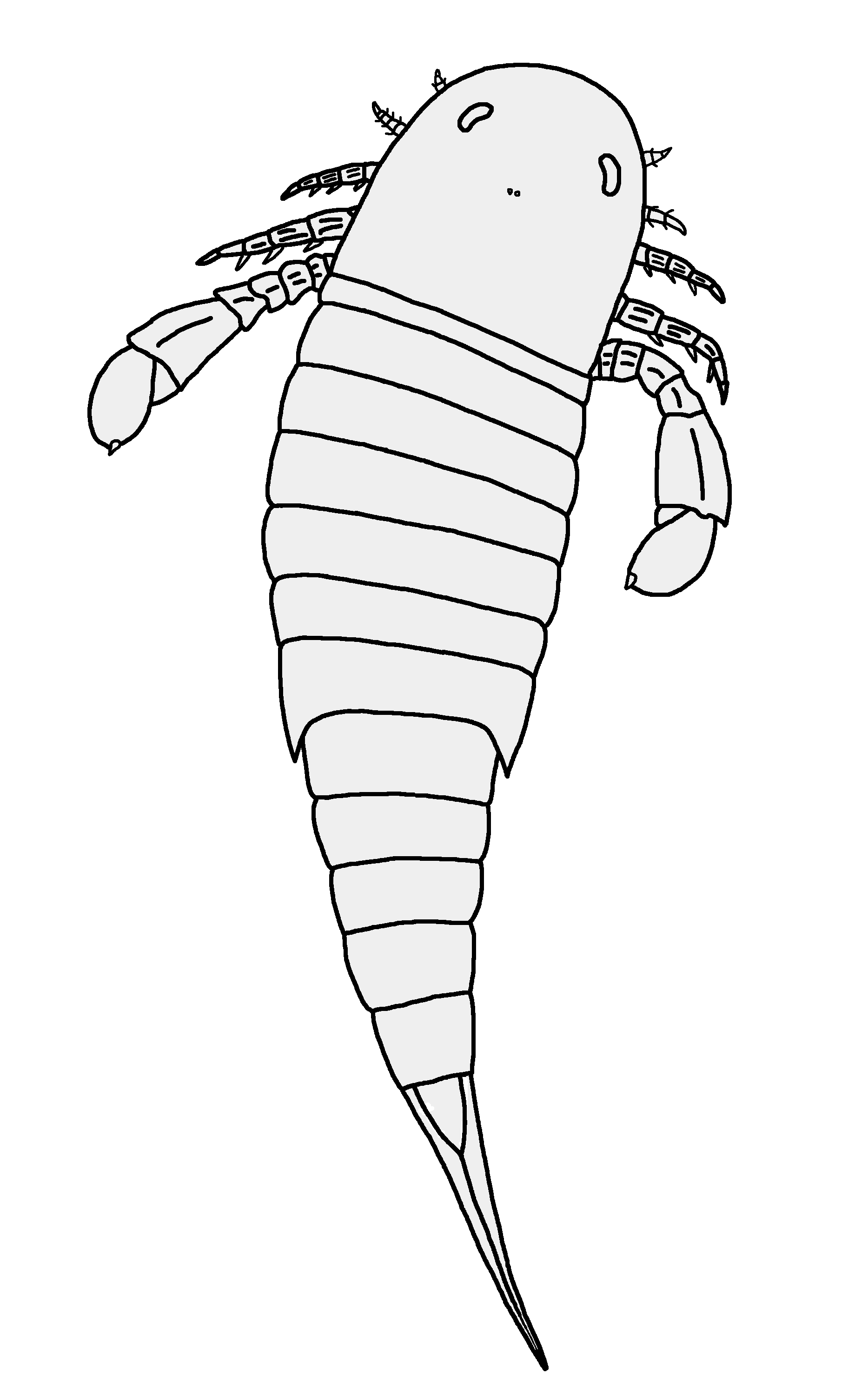
Reconstruction of Nanahughmilleria norvegica. Nanahughmilleria was one of the many products of major taxonomic revisals by eurypterid researchers in the 1960s.

==== 1961 ====
- Kjellesvig-Waering described the new species Salteropterus longilabium, Pterygotus (Pterygotus) denticulatus, P. (P.) grandidentatus, P. (P.) lightbodyi, Carcinosoma harleyi and Dolichopterus bulbosus. The new genus Parahughmilleria is described with P. salteri as the type species. Hughmilleria bellistriata, H. phelpsae and Eurypterus maria are moved to this genus. The subgenus Erettopterus is regarded as a new genus and is separated into two new subgenera, E. (Erettopterus), including the new species E. (E.) brodiei, E. (E.) marstoni and E. (E.) spatulatus, and E. (Truncatiramus), including the new subspecies E. (T.) gigas megalodon. The genus Hughmilleria is split into two new subgenera, H. (Hughmilleria) and H. (Nanahughmilleria).
- Kjellesvig-Waering transfers the species Pterygotus punctatus to Carcinosoma as Pterygotus punctatum.

==== 1962 ====
- Nestor Ivanovich Novozhilov names the genus Rhinocarcinosoma to contain the species R. vaningeni and R. cicerops, previously referred to Eusarcus (Paracacinosoma).

==== 1964 ====
- Charles D. Waterston names the genus Jaekelopterus to contain the species Pterygotus rhenaniae.
- Kjellesvig-Waering described the species Pterygotus impacatus and Pterygotus lanarkensis.
- Kjellesvig-Waering described the species Pterygotus marylandicus.
- Kjellesvig-Waering questionably assigned Selaginites formosus to Pterygotus as Pterygotus formosus.
- Caster and Khellesvig-Waering recognize Eusarcus and Carcinosoma to represent distinct genera and since Eusarcus is pre-occupied, they coin the replacement name Paracarcinosoma for its species.
- Caster and Kjellesvig-Waering described the species Eocarcinosoma batrachophthalmus.
- Caster and Kjellesvig-Waering describe two new species of Megalograptus, M. williamsae and M. shideleri. They also assign the species M. alveolatus, named as a species of Ctenpterus, to Megalograptus.

==== 1966 ====
- Kjellesvig-Waering and Willard P. Leutze described the new species Bassipterus virginicus (a new genus), Drepanopterus nodosus and Erettopterus (Truncatiramus) exophthalmus. The species H. (N.) phelpsae is classified as a new genus, Pittsfordipterus. Rhenopterus matarakensis is assigned to Parahughmilleria, R. schiraensis is assigned to Hughmilleria (Nanahughmilleria).

==== 1968 ====
- Nestor Ivanovich Novojilov classifies Slimonia into a new family of its own, the Slimonidae.
- Waterston re-examines Eurypterus minutisculptus and concludes that it represents a genus of its own, which he names Vernonopterus.
- Størmer and Waterston re-examine the fossil species referred to Glyptoscorpius and name the new genus Cyrtoctenus, containing the species C. caledonicus, C. dewalquei (previously Eurypterus), C. ostraviensis (previously Ctenopterus) and C. peachi. They also name the genus Dunsopterus to contain the species G. stevensoni.

==== 1969 ====
- Størmer described the species Rhenopterus sievertsi.

=== 1970s ===
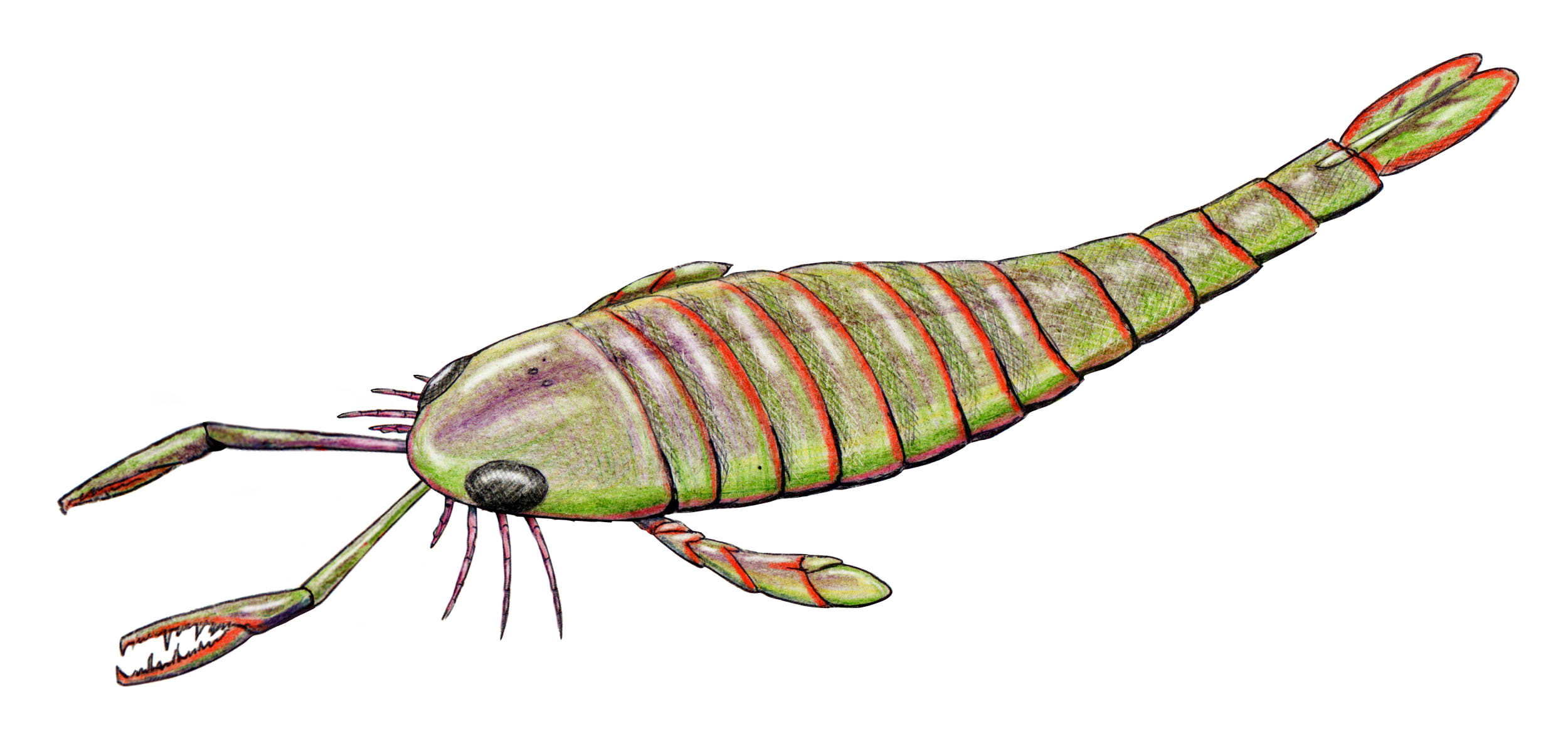
Reconstruction of Erettopterus. Two new species of Erettopterus were described in the 1970s.

==== 1971 ====
- Kjellesvig-Waering described the species Erettopterus serricaudatus and Erettopterus carinatus.
- Bermudo Meléndez described the species Lepidoderma asturica.

==== 1973 ====
- Kjellesvig-Waering described the species Slimonia boliviana.

==== 1974 ====
- Størmer creates the family Jaekelopteridae to contain Jaekelopterus. This family has subsequently been treated as synonymous with the Pterygotidae.
- Størmer raises the Pterygotus subgenus Acutiramus and the Erettopterus subgenus Truncatiramus to the level of separate genera.

==== 1979 ====
- Kjellesvig-Waering described the new genus and species Holmipterus suecicus.
- Waterston creates the family Parastylonuridae and includes Hardieopterus, Parastylonurus and, tentatively, Dorfopterus and Lamontopterus on it.

=== 1980s ===
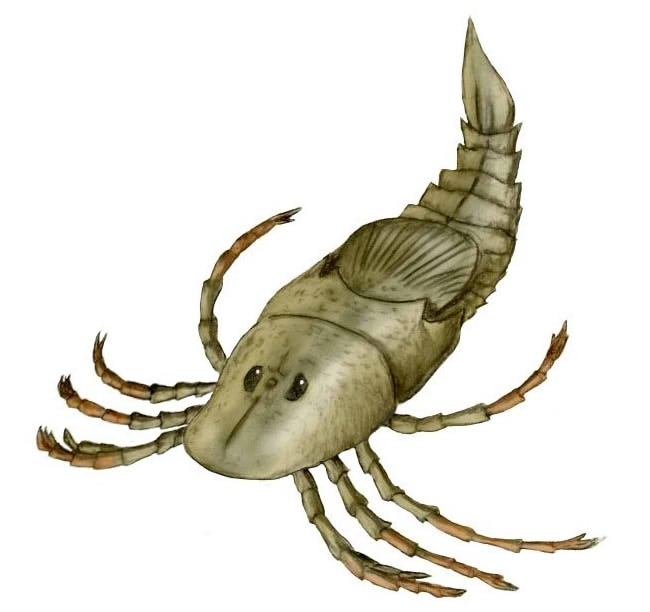
Reconstruction of Megarachne servinei. At the time of its 1980 description, Megarachne was believed to have been a gigantic prehistoric spider.

==== 1980 ====
- Mario Hünicken described the new genus and species Megarachne servinei as a mygalomorph spider.

==== 1981 ====
- Barry S. Kues and Kenneth K. Kietzke described the species Adelophthalmus luceroensis.

==== 1983 ====
- Roy E. Plotnick reassigns the species Eurypterus lohesti to Adelophthalmus and renders Dorfopterus an incertae sedis genus within Eurypterida.

==== 1985 ====
- John E. Almond examined the Necrogammarus fossil, believing it to represent an early aquatic relative of the Uniramia subphylum of arthropods.
- Alexey G. Ponomarenko described the species Hibbertopterus permianus, the last known surviving eurypterid.
- Waterston, Oelofsen and Oosthuizen describe Cyrtoctenus wittebergensis.
- Jones and Kjellesvig-Waering publish a study on eurypterids from Arctic Canada.

==== 1986 ====
- Paul Selden recognizes the fossil remains of Necrogammarus, previously believed to possibly represent a crustacean or a millipede, to be fragmentary fossils of a pterygotid eurypterid.

==== 1989 ====
- Salteropterus is placed in the family Slimonidae by Tollerton.
- Tollerton publishes a major taxonomic revision of the Eurypterida, dividing it into suborders Eurypterina and Ptergotina and recognizing some eurypterids, such as the hibbertopterids, as outside the order and part of a distinct order he calls Cyrtoctenida. Modern research favors suborders Eurypterina and Stylonurina instead.
- The fossil that will later be designated as the holotype of Rhinocarcinosoma dosonensis is discovered in northern Vietnam and initially misidentified as a chasmataspidid.

=== 1990s ===
==== 1992 ====
- Ciurca reported specimens of Rhinocarcinosoma and Paracarcinosoma from elsewhere in the United States, the genera previously mainly being known from fossils found in New York State.

==== 1993 ====
- Further fossils of Rhinocarcinosoma are collected in northern Vietnam which will later form the basis of the new species R. dosonensis.

==== 1994 ====
- Chlupáč describes the species Acutiramus perneri.

==== 1995 ====
- Braddy, Richard John Aldridge and Johannes N. Theron described the species Onychopterella augusti.

== 21st century ==
=== 2000s ===
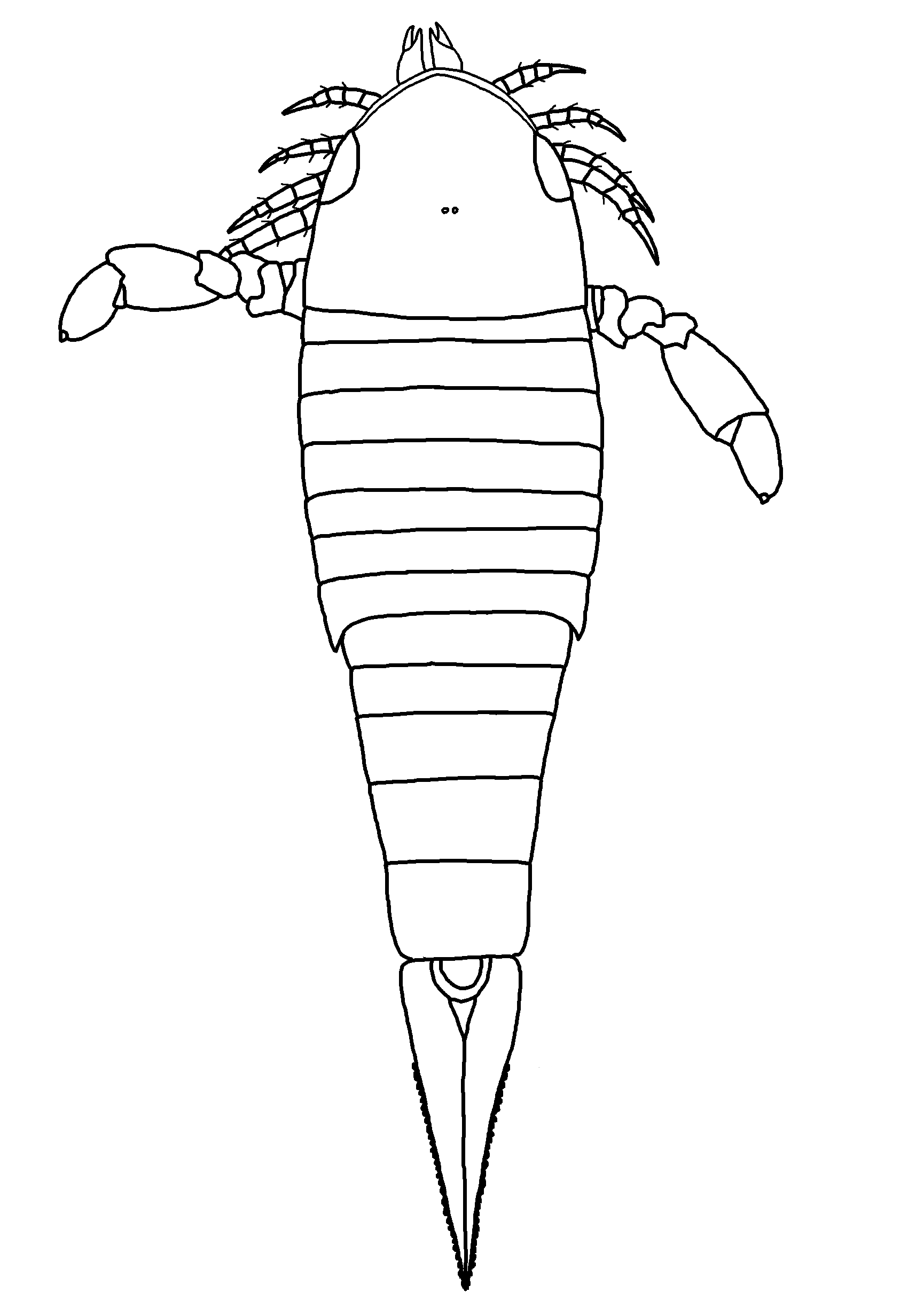
Reconstruction of Herefordopterus banksii. Regarded as a species of Hughmilleria since 1859, H. banksii was concluded to represent a genus of its own in 2006.

==== 2002 ====
- Braddy, Selden and Truong described the species Rhinocarcinosoma dosonensis.

==== 2003 ====
- Tollerton revises the Ordovician eurypterid genera of New York, determining that many of them are based on pseudofossils and thus invalid.

==== 2004 ====
- Poschmann reassigned the species Rhenopterus sievertsi to Adelophthalmus.

==== 2005 ====
- Selden, Corronca and Hünicken recognized Megarachne servinei as a mycteroptid eurypterid.

==== 2006 ====
- Tetlie interpreted Hughmilleria banksii as a new genus, Herefordopterus. In addition, the species Hughmilleria acuminata was synonymized with Herefordopterus banksii.
- Evgenyi S. Shpinev described the species Adelophthalmus irinae.

==== 2007 ====
- Tetlie, Selden & Ren described the new species Hughmilleria wangi.
- Miller and Tetlie determine that Bunodella represents an indeterminate species of Acutiramus. However, it is not formally synonymized and is regarded as a nomen dubium.
- Poschmann and Tetlie determine that Jaekelopterus was a highly derived pterygotid, not a basal form as previously assumed. It is declared to represent the largest known eurypterid.
- Tetlie described the new species Pterygotus sarlei.
- Ciurca and Tetlie transfer the species Pterygotus waylandsmithi to Erettopterus. Additionally, they concluded that P. monroensis was synonymous with E. osiliensis.
- Tetlie suggests that Dorfopterus might represent a telson of Strobilopterus princetonii and tentatively synonymizes Dorfopterus into the species.

==== 2008 ====
- Tetlie and Poschmann reclassify Hughmilleria patteni as part of its own genus, Eysyslopterus.

==== 2009 ====
- Tetlie and Briggs erect the new genus Ciurcopterus to contain species Pterygotus ventricosus and Pterygotus sarlei.

=== 2010s ===
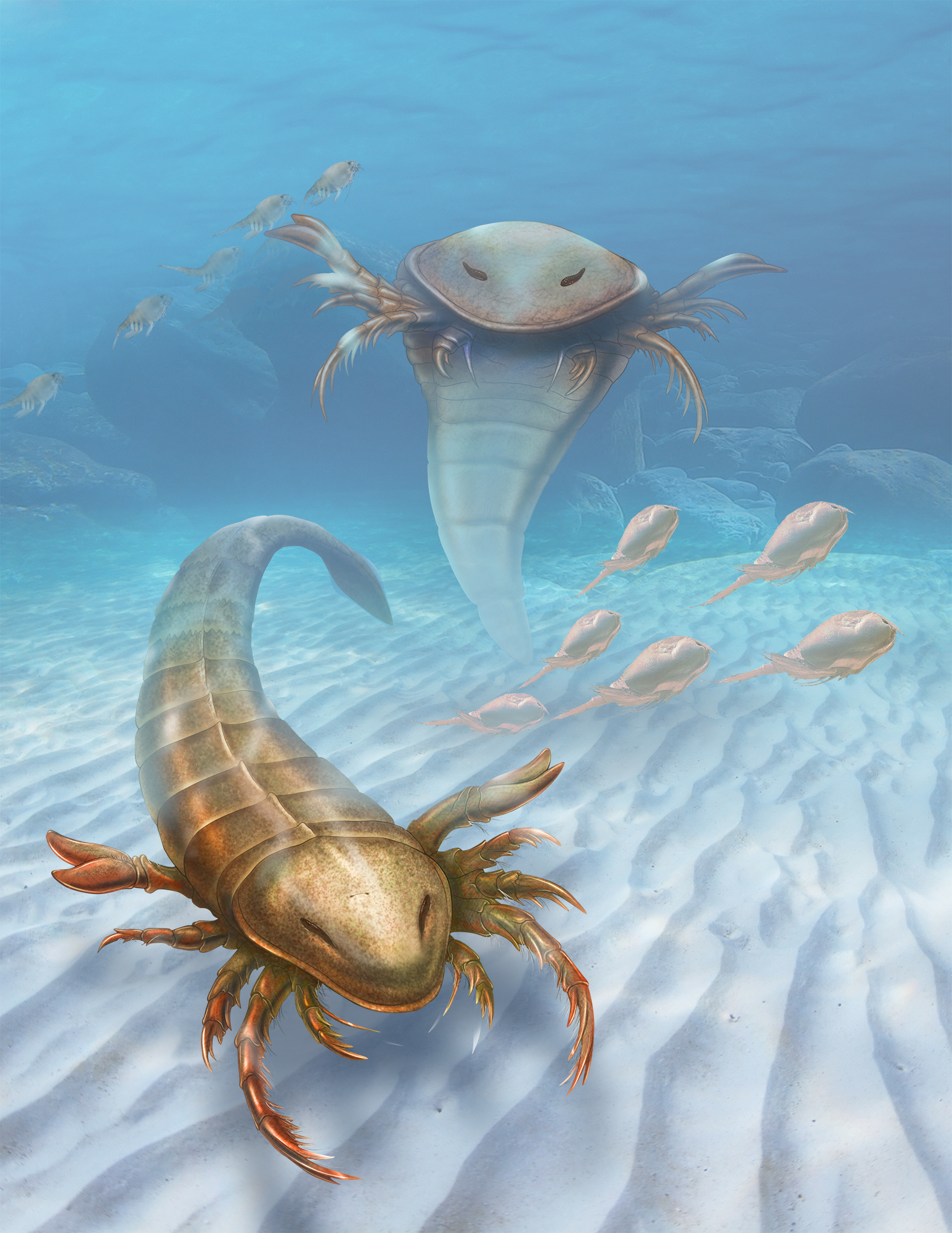
Reconstruction of Pentecopterus decorahensis. Described in 2015, Pentecopterus is the oldest known eurypterid.

==== 2012 ====
- Shpinev described the new species Parahughmilleria longa and Nanahughmilleria notosibirica.
- Shpinev described the new species Adelophthalmus kamyshtensis and Adelophthalmus dubius.
- Lamsdell publishes a phylogenetic analysis which finds Merostomata to be invalid, as Xiphosura is paraphyletic, and finds eurypterids to be more closely related to arachnids than to horseshoe crabs.
- Jason A. Dunlop and Lamsdell pointed out that Eusarcana holds priority over Paracarcinosoma as a replacement name for Eusarcus, designating Paracarcinosoma as a junior synonym of Eusarcana.
- Lamsdell reassigned Hibbertopterus permianus to Campylocephalus as Campylocephalus permianus.

==== 2013 ====
- Lamsdell, Simonetto and Selden described the species Adelophthalmus piussii, the first eurypterid to be discovered in Italy.
- Tetlie's suggestion that Dorfopterus is a telson of Strobilopterus princetonii is put into question by Lamsdell and Selden.

==== 2015 ====
- Poschmann transferred Erieopterus statzi to the genus Parahughmilleria. The new genus and species Wiedopterus noctua is described.
- Lamsdell et al. described the new genus and species Pentecopterus decorahensis, the oldest eurypterid known to date.
- McCoy, Lamsdell, Poschmann, Anderson and Briggs conduct a study on the eyes of pterygotid eurypterids and determine that the genera included in the family, such as Jaekelopterus, Acutiramus and Ptergyotus, had divergent adaptations, suggesting they had different ecological roles despite their close outward resemblance.

==== 2017 ====
- Vrazo & Ciurca described the new ichnogenus and ichnospecies Arcuites bertiensis, interpreted as traces of a swimming eurypterid.

==== 2018 ====
- Plax et al. described the new genus and species Soligorskopterus tchepeliensis.
- Shpinev & Filimonov described the new species Adelophthalmus khakassicus.

==== 2019 ====
- Emily Hughes concludes that the genera Cyrtoctenus and Dunsopterus represent junior synonyms of Hibbertopterus.
- Schoenemann, Poschmann and Clarkson publish a study comparing the eyes of Jaekelopterus with those of horseshoe crabs, arachnids and other arthropods.
- Naugolnykh and Areshin describe the new species Soligorskopterus shpinevi.

=== 2020s ===
==== 2020 ====
- Russell D. C. Bicknell, Patrick M. Smith and Poschmann classify the species Pterygotus australis as a nomen dubium.
- Poschmann describes the new genus and species Pruemopterus salgadoi.
- Lamsdell et al. describe the new species Adelophthalmus pyrrhae.

==== 2021 ====
- Brandt publishes a study on the possible relationships between eurypterid morphology, the ease with which members of this group experienced ecdysis and the longevity of eurypterid species.
- Wang et al. describe Terropterus xiushanensis, to date the most recently described eurypterid genus and species.

== See also ==
- List of eurypterid genera
- History of paleontology
- Timeline of paleontology
