= Soligorskopterus =

Soligorskopterus Temporal range: Lower Frasnian-Middle Famennian, 382.7–364.7 Ma

Scientific classification
- Kingdom: Animalia
- Phylum: Arthropoda
- Subphylum: Chelicerata
- Order: †Eurypterida
- Superfamily: †Stylonuroidea
- Family: †Stylonuridae
- Genus: †Soligorskopterus; Plax et al. 2018

Type species
- †Soligorskopterus tchepeliensis Plax et al. 2018

Species
- †S. shpinevi Naugolnykh & Areshin, 2019; †S. tchepeliensis Plax et al. 2018

Extinct genus of arthropods

Soligorskopterus is a genus of eurypterid, a group of extinct aquatic arthropods. Fossils of Soligorskopterus have been discovered in deposits from the Late Devonian. The genus contains two species: S. tchepeliensis, the type species, from the Middle Famennian stage of Belarus, and S. shpinevi, from the Lower Frasnian stage of Russia. Its name derives from Soligorsk, the closest city from the fossil site of the type species, and the Greek word πτερόν (pteron), which means wing.

== See also ==
- List of eurypterid genera
- Timeline of eurypterid research
