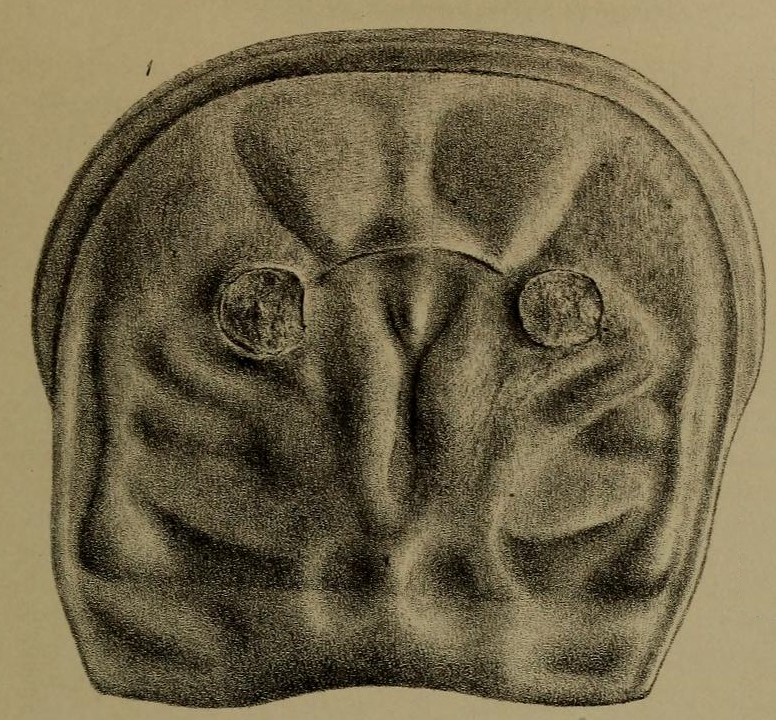
- Carapace of Pagea symondsii.

Scientific classification
- Kingdom: Animalia
- Phylum: Arthropoda
- Subphylum: Chelicerata
- Order: †Eurypterida
- Superfamily: †Stylonuroidea
- Family: †Stylonuridae
- Genus: †Pagea; Waterston, 1962

Type species
- Pagea sturrocki (Waterston, 1962)

Other species
- P. plotnicki Lamsdell, Braddy, Loeffler & Dineley, 2010; P. symondsii Salter, 1859

Synonyms
- Leiopterella tetliei Lamsdell, Braddy, Loeffler & Dineley, 2010

= Pagea =

Pagea Temporal range: Lochkovian–Pragian

Extinct genus of arthropods

Pagea is a genus of prehistoric eurypterid classified as part of the family Stylonuridae. It contains three species, all from the Devonian (Lochkovian to Pragian); P. plotnicki from Nunavut, Canada and P. sturrocki and P. symondsii from the Old Red Sandstone of the United Kingdom. The genus is named in honor of David Page, an early worker on the fauna of the Old Red Sandstone and describer of the first Stylonurine eurypterid.

== Description ==
Pagea was a large stylonurid eurypterid. The third and fourth prosomal appendages bore double rows of flat spines. The prosoma was subrectangularly shaped, with the eyes located on the anterior half.

The metastoma was narrow in relation to the width of the prosoma, being half as wide as it was long. The telson was styliform, long and keeled.

== Synonyms ==
Leiopterella tetliei, a small eurypterid known only from the single specimen CMN 53573 from the Early Devonian of Nunavut, Canada, was synonymized with Pagea by Lamdell (2025). Leiopterella was originally described in 2010 as a rhenopterid, though the features claimed in the original description were later determined to not actually be visible in the fossil. Lamsdell found no distinguishing characteristics between L. tetliei and the co-occurring Pagea plotnicki, and concluded that Leiopterella merely represented a juvenile individual of that species.

== See also ==
- List of eurypterids
