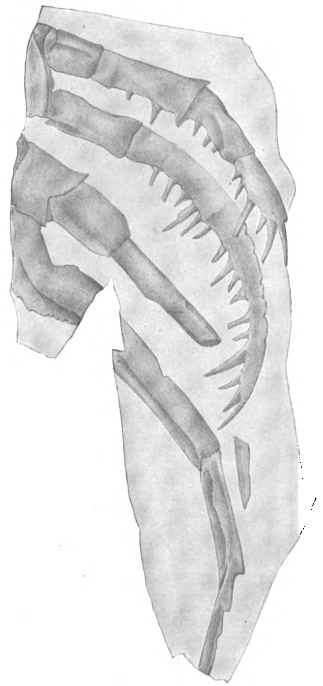

Scientific classification
- Kingdom: Animalia
- Phylum: Arthropoda
- Subphylum: Chelicerata
- Order: †Eurypterida
- Family: †Stylonuridae
- Subfamily: †Laurieipterinae
- Genus: †Laurieipterus; Kjellesvig-Waering, 1966

Type species
- Laurieipterus elegans (Laurie, 1899)

= Laurieipterus =

Laurieipterus Temporal range: Early Silurian

Extinct genus of arthropods

Laurieipterus is a genus of a eurypterid classified as part of the family Stylonuridae. It contains one species, L. elegans from the Early Silurian of Scotland.
