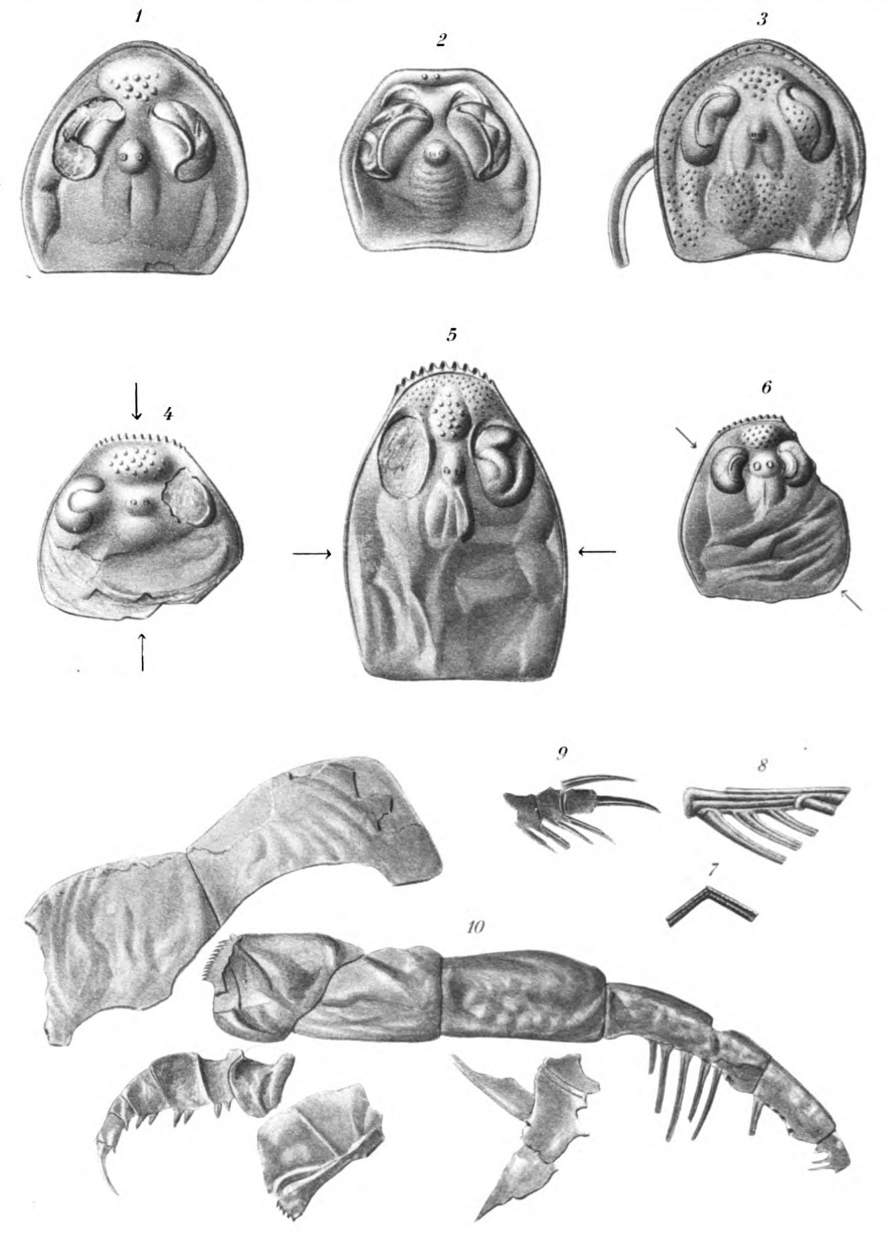
- Fossil elements referred to Ctenopterus.

Scientific classification
- Kingdom: Animalia
- Phylum: Arthropoda
- Subphylum: Chelicerata
- Order: †Eurypterida
- Suborder: †Stylonurina
- Superfamily: †Stylonuroidea
- Family: †Stylonuridae; Diener, 1924

Type species
- †Stylonurus powriensis Page, 1856

Subgroups
- †Pagea; †Soligorskopterus; †Stylonurus; †Qujingopterus; †Laurieipterinae Kjellesvig-Waering, 1966; †Ctenopterus; †Laurieipterus

Synonyms
- Laurieipteridae Kjellesvig-Waering, 1966; Pageidae Kjellesvig-Waering, 1966

= Stylonuridae =

Stylonuridae Temporal range: Rhuddanian-Famennian, 443.7–358.9 Ma

Extinct family of arthropods

Stylonuridae is a family of eurypterids, an extinct group of chelicerate arthropods commonly known as "sea scorpions". The family is one of two families contained in the superfamily Stylonuroidea (along with Parastylonuridae), which in turn is one of four superfamilies classified as part of the suborder Stylonurina.

Stylonuridae, which lived from Early Silurian to the Late Devonian, were small to very large forms with scales developing into tubercules and knobs. The prosoma (head) exhibited variable shape, with arcuate compound eyes located subcentrally, or anteriorly. Their abdomens were slender. Their walking legs were long and powerful, sometimes characterized by spines. Most genera did not have swimming legs.

== Description ==
Stylonurids are stylonuroids with undifferentiated opisthosoma with appendages II-IV being spiniferous akin to the genus Ctenopterus, whilst appendages V-VI are non-spiniferous akin to the genus Pagea. The fixed spines on appendages II-IV could have been used as dragnets to rake through the sediment, indiscriminately entangling anything within their sweeping arc. This type of sweep-feeding also occurs in the Hibbertopteroidea, though the adaptations of the hibbertopterids suggests they were more selective feeders.

== Systematics and genera ==
The Stylonuridae is classified within the superfamily Stylonuroidea within the Stylonurina. It contains six genera in total and one recognised subfamily; the Laurieipterinae containing genera Laurieipterus and Ctenopterus. "Laurieipterines" are diagnosed as stylonurids with broad metastoma and an epistoma with a rostral field and were restricted to the Early Silurian.

Family Stylonuridae Diener, 1924

- Pagea Waterston, 1962
- Soligorskopterus Plax et al., 2018
- Stylonurus Page, 1856
- Qujingopterus Ma et al., 2025
- Subfamily Laurieipterinae Kjellesvig-Waering, 1966
  - Ctenopterus Clarke & Ruedermann, 1912
  - Laurieipterus Kjellesvig-Waering, 1966
