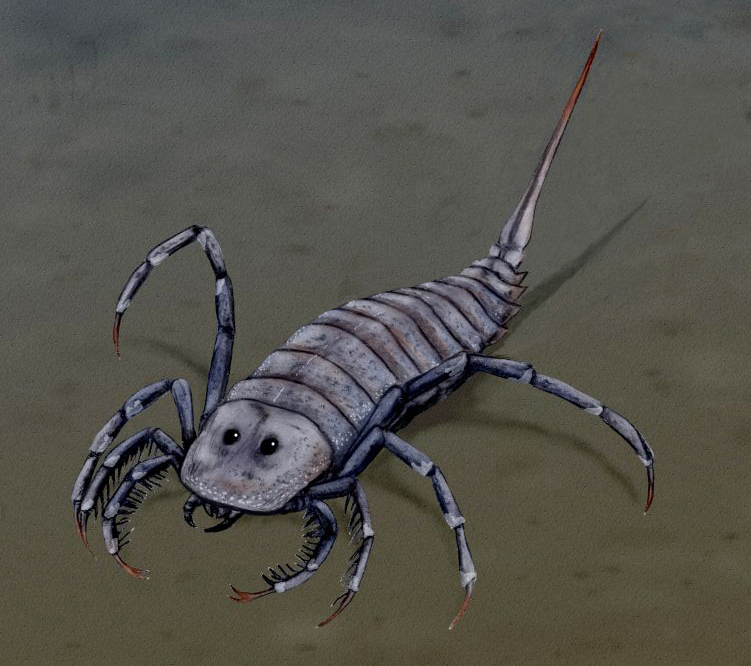
- Restoration of S. powriensis.

Scientific classification
- Kingdom: Animalia
- Phylum: Arthropoda
- Subphylum: Chelicerata
- Order: †Eurypterida
- Superfamily: †Stylonuroidea
- Family: †Stylonuridae
- Genus: †Stylonurus; Page, 1856

Type species
- Stylonurus powriensis Page, 1856

Other species
- ?S. perspicillum Størmer, 1969; ?S. shaffneri Willard, 1933

= Stylonurus =

Stylonurus Temporal range: Devonian

Extinct genus of Devonian organisms

Stylonurus is a genus of prehistoric eurypterid of the family Stylonuridae. The genus contains three species: Stylonurus powriensis from the Devonian of Scotland, Stylonurus shaffneri from the Devonian of Pennsylvania and Stylonurus perspicillum from the Devonian of Germany.

The assignment of S. perspicillum and S. schaffneri to the genus is doubtful. A previously assigned species, S. ensiformis, is today regarded as synonymous with S. powriensis.

== Description ==
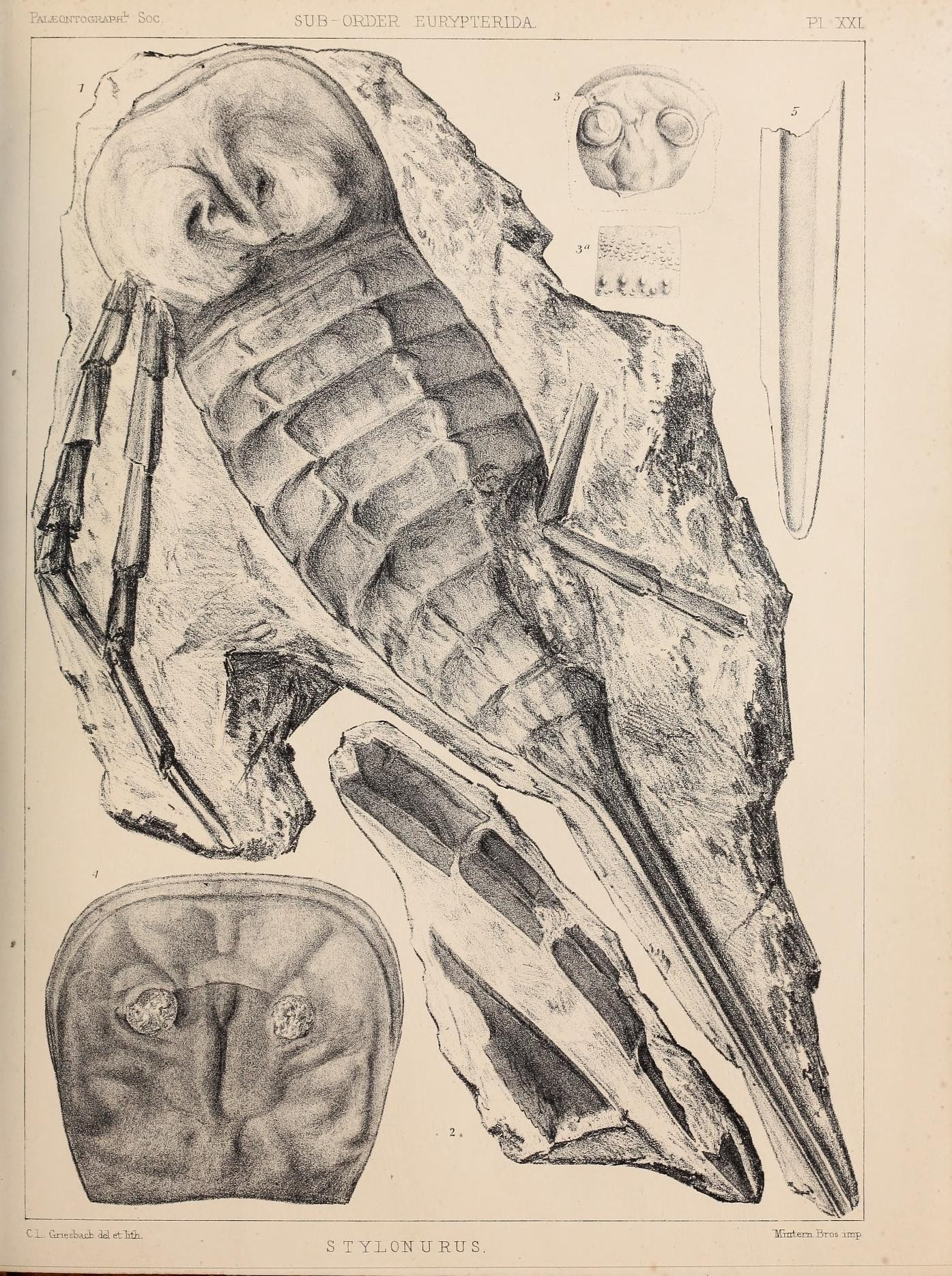
Fossil of Stylonurus powriei (S. powriensis)

Stylonurids, which lived from the Ordovician to Lower Permian periods, were small to very large forms with scales developing into tubercles and knobs. The prosoma (head) exhibited variable shape, with arcuate compound eyes located subcentrally, or anteriorly. Their abdomens were slender. Their walking legs were long and powerful, sometimes characterized by spines. Most genera did not have swimming legs.

Stylonurus is distinguishable from other stylonurids by their smooth surface, and the greatly elongated 5th (last) pair of walking legs, which reached as far as the telson, which was long and styliform. The prosoma (head) varied from semiovate to subrectangular.

== See also ==
- List of eurypterids
