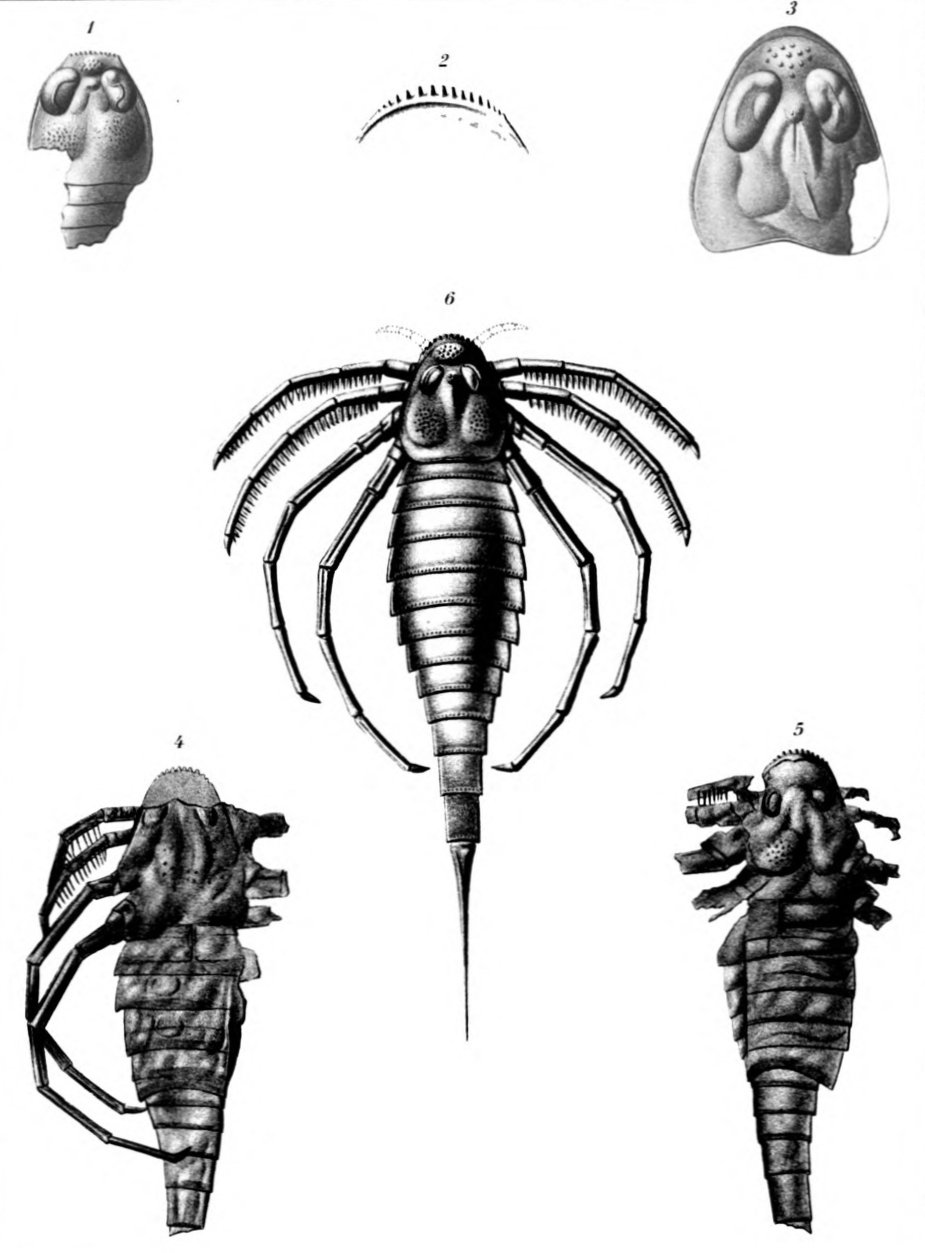
- Restoration and fossils

Scientific classification
- Kingdom: Animalia
- Phylum: Arthropoda
- Subphylum: Chelicerata
- Order: †Eurypterida
- Family: †Stylonuridae
- Subfamily: †Laurieipterinae
- Genus: †Ctenopterus; Clarke & Ruedemann, 1912
- Species: †C. cestrotus

Binomial name
- †Ctenopterus cestrotus (Clarke, 1907)

= Ctenopterus =

Ctenopterus Temporal range: Early Silurian

Extinct genus of sea scorpions

Ctenopterus is a genus of prehistoric eurypterid of the family Stylonuridae. It contains only one species, Ctenopterus cestrotus from the Early Silurian of Otisville, New York, United States.

== Description ==
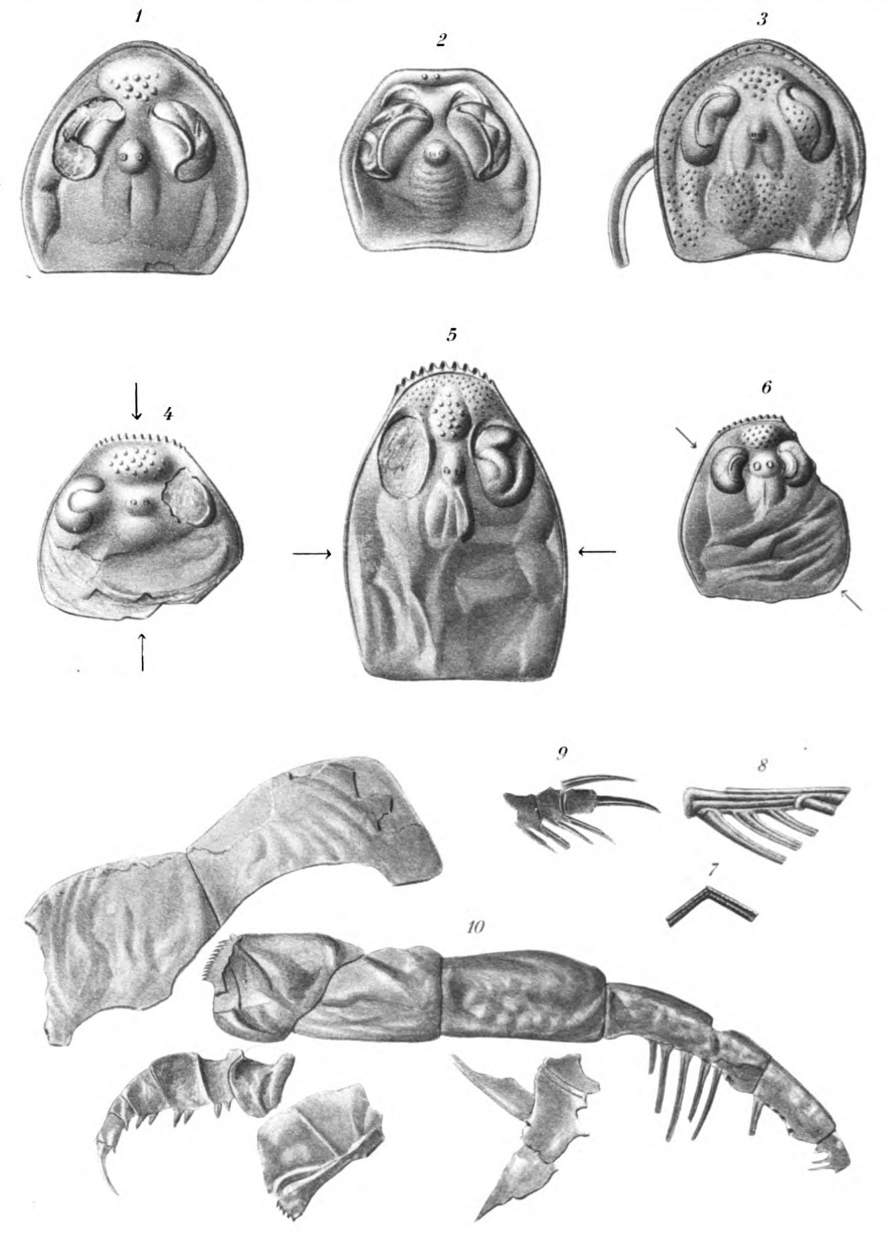
Elements of Ctenopterus (1-7)

Stylonurids, which lived from the Ordovician to Lower Permian periods, were small to very large forms with scales developing into tubercules and knobs. The prosoma (head) exhibited variable shape, with arcuate compound eyes located subcentrally, or anteriorly. Their abdomens were slender. Their walking legs were long and powerful, sometimes characterized by spines. Most genera did not have swimming legs.

Ctenopterus is distinguished by its prosoma (head), which narrows towards the front. All of its legs are walking legs; the second and third pairs are strongly developed, with a double row of numerous flat spines; the last pair is long, without spines. Ctenopterus dates from the Silurian period.

== See also ==
- List of eurypterids
