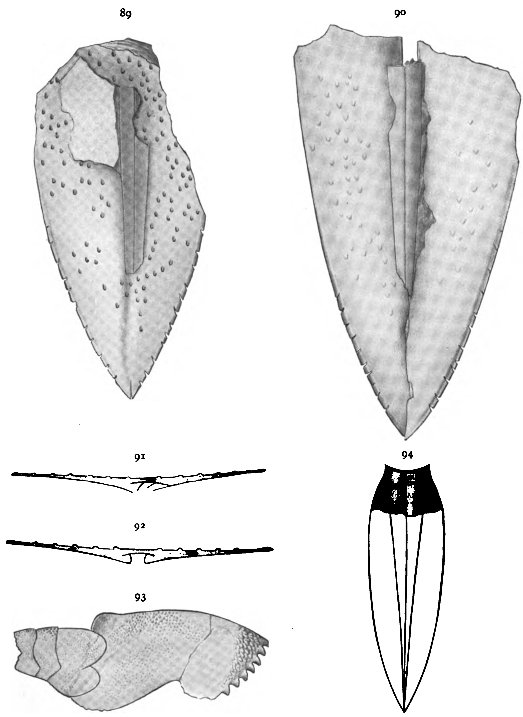
- Telson (89-92) and coxa (93) of H. whitei. (94) is a telson of an Eurypterus for comparison. (Not to scale)

Scientific classification
- Kingdom: Animalia
- Phylum: Arthropoda
- Subphylum: Chelicerata
- Order: †Eurypterida
- Superfamily: †Mycteropoidea
- Family: †Mycteroptidae
- Genus: †Hastimima; White, 1908

Type species
- Hastimima whitei White, 1908

Species
- †H. whitei White, 1908

Synonyms
- †?H. sewardi Strand, 1926

= Hastimima =

Hastimima Temporal range: Lower Permian (Sakmarian) ~293–290 Ma

Extinct genus of Arthropod

Hastimima is a genus of Brazilian eurypterid, a group of extinct marine arthropods. Fossils of Hastimima have been discovered in Permian coal deposits of the Rio Bonito Formation, in Santa Catarina. When they were originally described, the remains were identified as fossil plants of unknown affinity (incertae sedis) and named Hastimima whitei, only later being properly identified as eurypterids. Other specimens were reported from South Africa and Arizona, USA. However, these remains have been deemed as either nomen dubium or too undiagnostic for classification.

This genus is notable for being one of the few eurypterids discovered in the Southern Hemisphere.

== Discovery and history of research ==
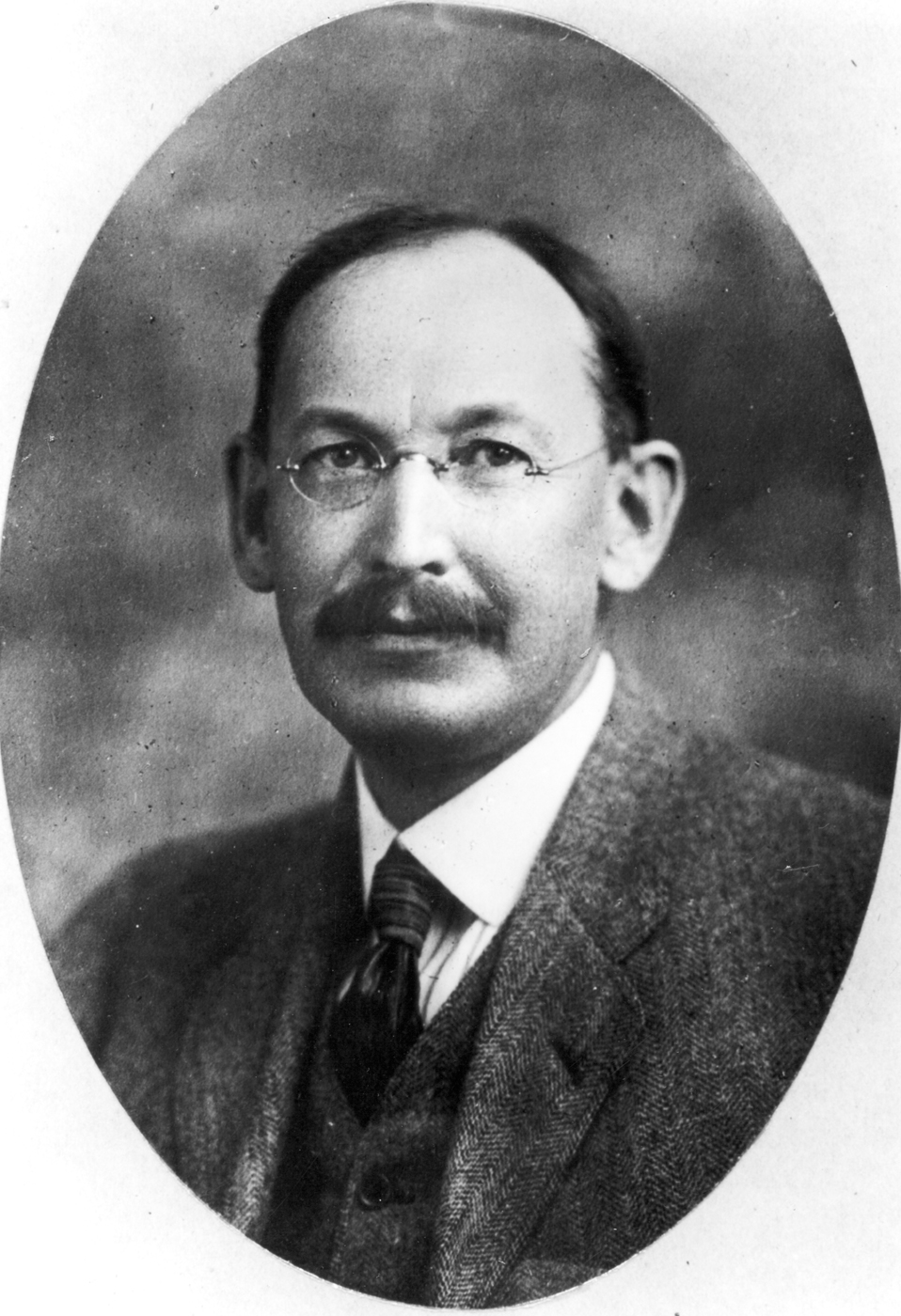
David White, the geologist who discovered Hastimima whitei.

The original specimens of Hastimima were described by David White in 1908, in a geologic report on coal deposits in Brazil. According to White, the fossils were found "Northeast of Minas - Santa Catarina. About 55 metres (180 ft) above the granite, or 255 metres (837 ft) below the Iraty black shale". "Minas" was the old name of the municipality of Lauro Müller, Santa Catarina, and the black shale mentioned is the Irati Formation. The locality where the fossils where found was described in later papers as the Rio Bonito Formation. White reports that, to him, the fossil appeared to be the integument of some animal, but consultation with several specialists on vertebrate and invertebrate paleontology led to no results. He therefore described the fossil as vegetable remains, but noted his doubt about this classification. Until that point, no fossils bones, scales, or teeth had been discovered from either that bed or horizon. He describes it as a bilaterally symmetric lamina supported by a thick framework, lacking any nerves and presenting small tubercles. The borders of the lamina also possess serration.

The specific name, H. whitei, was named in honour of Dr. Israel Charles White, the chief of the Coal Commission.

In a note to the Geological Magazine in 1909, H. Woodward noted that the remains looked as those of an eurypterid, comparing the hastate shaped of the lamina to the telson of Pterygotus and the ornamentation to that of Eurypterus punctatus. He also identified obscured parts of the appendages in the illustrations.

J. M. Clarke and R. Ruedemann revisited the genus Hastimima in 1912 for their book, The Eurypterida of New York. After studying the specimens they concluded that it indeed contained three fragments pertaining to the one species; a portion of a tergite, a telson and a proximal part of the leg with a coxa. The surviving remains of the tergite make up an subtriangular fragment, with the original margins of the segment surviving in one side. The telson was preserved in set of matching slab and counterslab showing an impression of the surface, while the interior of the fossil is filled with rock. The leg appendage preserved is a well visible coxa, whereas other three leg segments are very faint and difficult to make out in the fossil. The authors also noted that, while H. whitei has similarities to Pterygotus, it has enough differences to be separated from pterygotids.

In 1926, Strand reported the species Hastimima sewardi from the Late Devonian of South Africa. However, more recent studies have found it to be a nomen dubium, with the material not being diagnostic enough to classify it beyond being a member of Hibbertopteridae. Likewise, the same can be said for another occurrence of the genus purported by White in 1929. According to him, a possible Hastimima sp. was identified from the Permian age Hermit Formation of the Grand Canyon. However, the fossil is amorphous, lacking ornamentation and so poorly preserved that even the classification as an arthropod is dubious.

In 1994, Rosa et al. described a new species of ichnfossil of the Rio Bonito Formation, from Cachoeira do Sul, Rio Grande do Sul. Named Craticulichnum iruiensis, it was inferred to be the impression of a unidentified Merostomatan resting on the substrate. One of proposed producers of the mark, besides limulids, were eurypterids akin to Hastimima.

Originally considered a hibbertopterid, later analysis demonstrated that they show closer affinity to mycteropids. In specific, H. whitei forms a sister taxon with Megarachne servinei in both the 2012 and 2025 phylogenetic analysis by James Lamsdell.

== Description ==
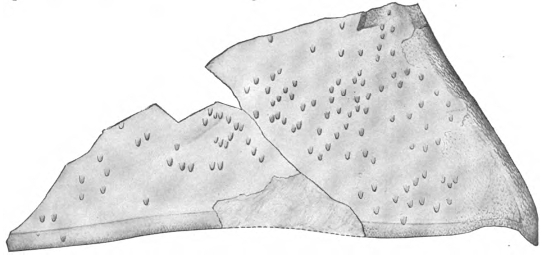
Fragment of anterior tergite from Hastimima.

From the remains that can be confidently attributed to Hastimima, the genus is known from remains of the telson, a fragment of one anterior tergite and a proximal portion of a leg with coxa attached. The telson (the final segment of the body) has an hastate outline (in the shape of a gladius, a Roman sword), and it consists of two laminae; a dorsal and a ventral portion, with a gap of 4.5 mm (0.18 in) between them. The dorsal lamina is one uninterrupted structure, covered in drop-like scales, while the ventral portion consists of two smooth laminae separated in the middle by a cleft. A third, narrower lamina is located inside of the median cleft on the ventral side, between the two laminae. This third plate exhibits a median suture line. The borders of the telson has serrations or rounded dentitions.

The other portion recovered was that of a tergite, an arthropod dorsal segment. The original margins of the segment survive in one side, meeting at an acute angle and being further marked by a thicker outline, remnants of an original folding in the segments border. Like the telson, the surface shows ornamentation of irregularly distributed blunt or drop-like spines. From the shape of the tergite, it was interpreted as one of the anterior or front segments of the animal and that, by the shape of the fragment, its preabdomen must have expanded in a manner similar to Eusarcana (syn. Eusarcus Grote & Pitt, 1875 e;g in Clarke and Ruedemann, 1912).

The third identified portion was that of a proximal right leg. It preserves the coxa (base that articulates the leg with the body) with a gnathobase (a structure used for feeding), as well as the first three segments of the leg. The coxa is slightly curved, and on its gnathobase it possesses 9 or so blunt teeth, which become flatter posteriorly. Close to these teeth is a set of elongated polygonal scales, the remainer of the coxa being detailed by small subcircular scales and tubercles.

The ornamentation seen on the specimens, as well as the shape of the tergite, suggests a closer affinity to the family Mycteroptidae, more specifically towards the Argentine species Megarachne servinei. It is thus very likely that Hastimima bears a very close anatomical resemblance to M. servinei.

The size of the fossil remains are not given in detail in either the original 1908 publication nor the 1912 redescription. David White (1908) describes the matrix filling between the two laminae as being 4.5 mm in thickness. In Clarke and Ruedemann (1912), they illustrate the tergite in natural size. If compared to its closest relative, Megarachne, then Hastimima could probably achieve a similar length of around 50 cm (20 in).

== Classification ==
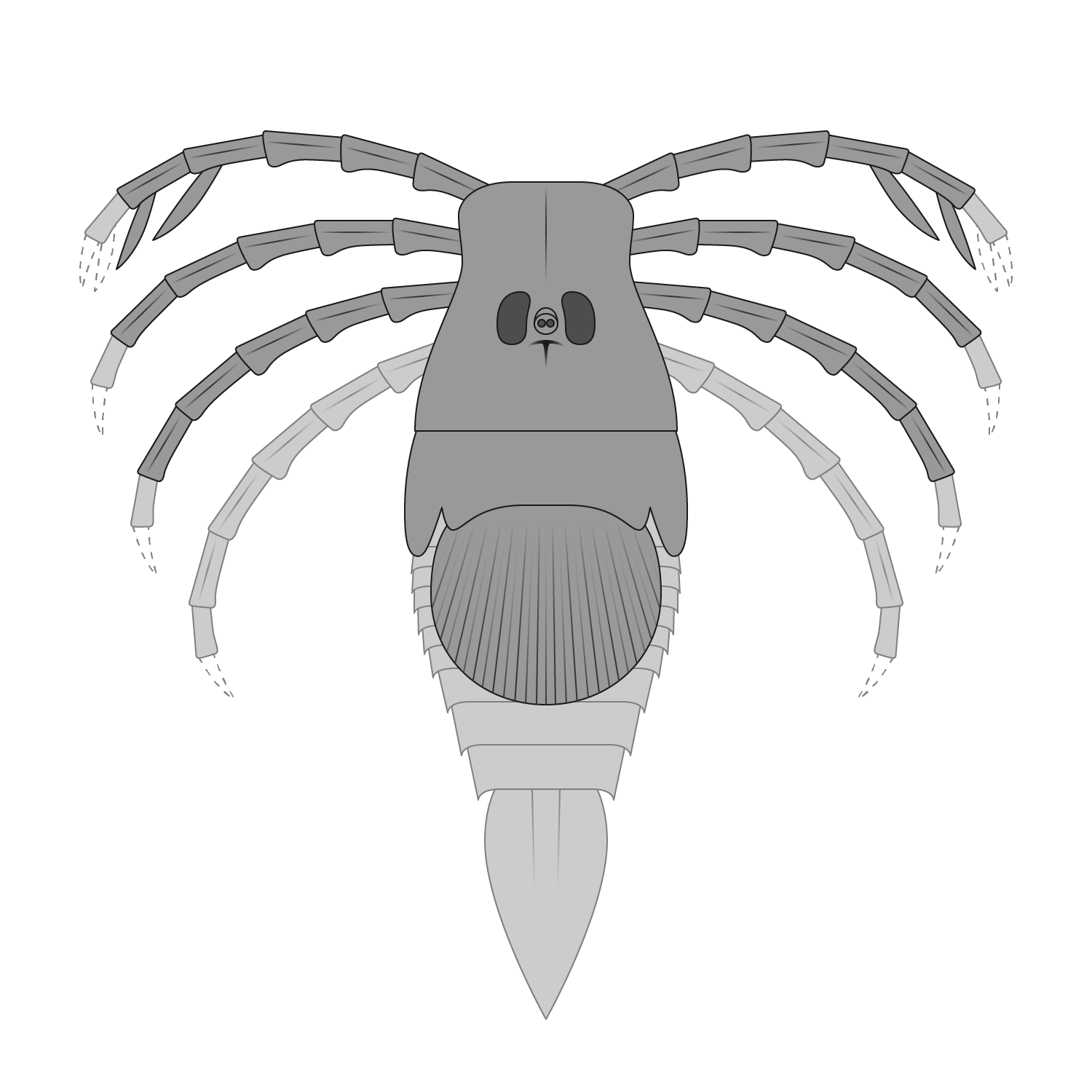
Reconstruction of Megarachne servinei, the closest relative to Hastimima.

Hastimima was a part of the stylonurine suborder, a rare group of eurypterids that preserved their last prosomal appendage for walking, as opposed to the eurypterine suborder, in which it became a paddle-like structure for swimming. Within that group, Hastimima is a member of the Mycteropoidea superfamily. In a 2010 phylogenetic analysis of the suborder Stylonurina, Lamsdell et al. placed Hastimima in the family Hibbertopteridae. However, in a 2012 publication by the same author where Hastimima, Campylocephalus and Drepanopterus were included in the analysis, H. whitei fell within Mycteroptidae, showing great affinity to Megarachne from Argentina. This is likely because of the temporal and paleogeographical proximities between the two species. Moreover, Lamsdell also notes that the ornamentation of H. whitei more resembles that of mycteroptids than those of hibbertopterids. Further studies support this interpretation. Below is a cladogram adapted from Lamsdell (2025):

- Mycteropoidea
  - - Drepanopterus
  - - - Hibbertopteridae
        - - Hibbertopterus
          - Dunsopterus
        - Campylocephalus
      - Mycteroptidae
        - Woodwardopterus
        - - - Mycterops
          - - - Hastimima
              - Megarachne

== Paleoecology ==
The only confirmed specimens of Hastimima have been recovered from the coal deposits of the Rio Bonito Formation, in the Paraná Basin of Southern Brazil, which dates back to the Sakmarian age of the Lower Permian. The formation was deposited after the end of the Permo-Carboniferous Glaciation, in the "Greenhouse phase" that followed the previous "Icehouse period". Deposition occurred in a paralic environment (transition between the land and sea), with the sandstones, pelites, and coal seams having been interpreted as ancient deltas, lagoons, estuaries, and swampy lowlands. These deposits have yielded an abundant fossil record of continental and marine fauna and flora, as well as fossil pollen and spores. Fossil plants found in this formation include glossopterids, sphenopsids, lycopsids, gymnosperms, pteridophytes and marchantiophytes.

Because of its similarity to Megarachne, Hastimima probably lived a very similar lifestyle. The forward facing blade-like structures on the prosomal appendages of Megarachne and other mycteropoids suggest a sweep-feeding tactic, wherein the animal would rake through the soft sediment in the floodplains and estuaries in search of small invertebrates to capture and eat.

== See also ==
- List of eurypterid genera
