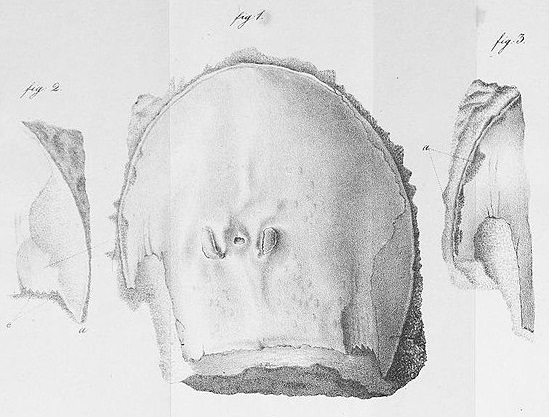
- Drawing of the carapace of C. oculatus by its original descriptor, Stepan S. Kutorga (1838)

Scientific classification
- Kingdom: Animalia
- Phylum: Arthropoda
- Subphylum: Chelicerata
- Order: †Eurypterida
- Superfamily: †Mycteropoidea
- Family: †Hibbertopteridae
- Genus: †Campylocephalus; Eichwald, 1860

Type species
- †Campylocephalus oculatus (Kutorga, 1838)

Species
- †C. oculatus (Kutorga, 1838); †C. permianus (Ponomarenko, 1985); †?C. salmi (Štúr, 1877)

Synonyms
- Eidothea Scouler, 1831, preoccupied; Campylognathus Diener, 1924, preoccupied

= Campylocephalus =

Campylocephalus Temporal range: Carboniferous-Middle Permian, 326.4–267 Ma

Extinct genus of arthropods

Campylocephalus is a genus of eurypterid, a group of extinct aquatic arthropods. Fossils of Campylocephalus have been discovered in deposits ranging from the Carboniferous period in the Czech Republic (the species C. salmi) to the Permian period of Russia (species C. oculatus and C. permianus). The generic name is composed of the Greek words καμπύλος (kampýlos), meaning "curved", and κεφαλή (kephalē), meaning "head".

It was a member of the hibbertopterid family of eurypterids and probably looked much the same as the other members of the family, Hibbertopterus and Vernonopterus, in that it was a large, broad and heavy animal quite different from the famous swimming eurypterids (such as Pterygotus and Eurypterus) which had been common during earlier periods. Like all other stylonurine eurypterids, Campylocephalus completely lacked swimming paddles.

Hibbertopterids such as Campylocephalus were, as many other families within the stylonurine suborder, sweep-feeders. Sweep-feeding food strategies involve specialized appendages with blades that could be used by the animals to rake through the substrate of their living environments in search for small prey items.

The species C. permianus, known from deposits of either the late Early Permian-early Middle Permian (Kungurian-Roadian stages) or the Late Permian in Russia, is the only species of Campylocephalus preserved well enough to allow for size estimates, published estimates putting its size at potentially 1.4 metres (4.6 feet) in length. This species was among the last known surviving eurypterid, living just before or during the Permian–Triassic extinction event 251.9 million years ago. Before the extinction event, eurypterids had been declining in numbers and diversity for millions of years; Campylocephalus had been the only known genus of living eurypterids for more than 20 million years since the extinction of the related genus Hastimima.

== Description ==
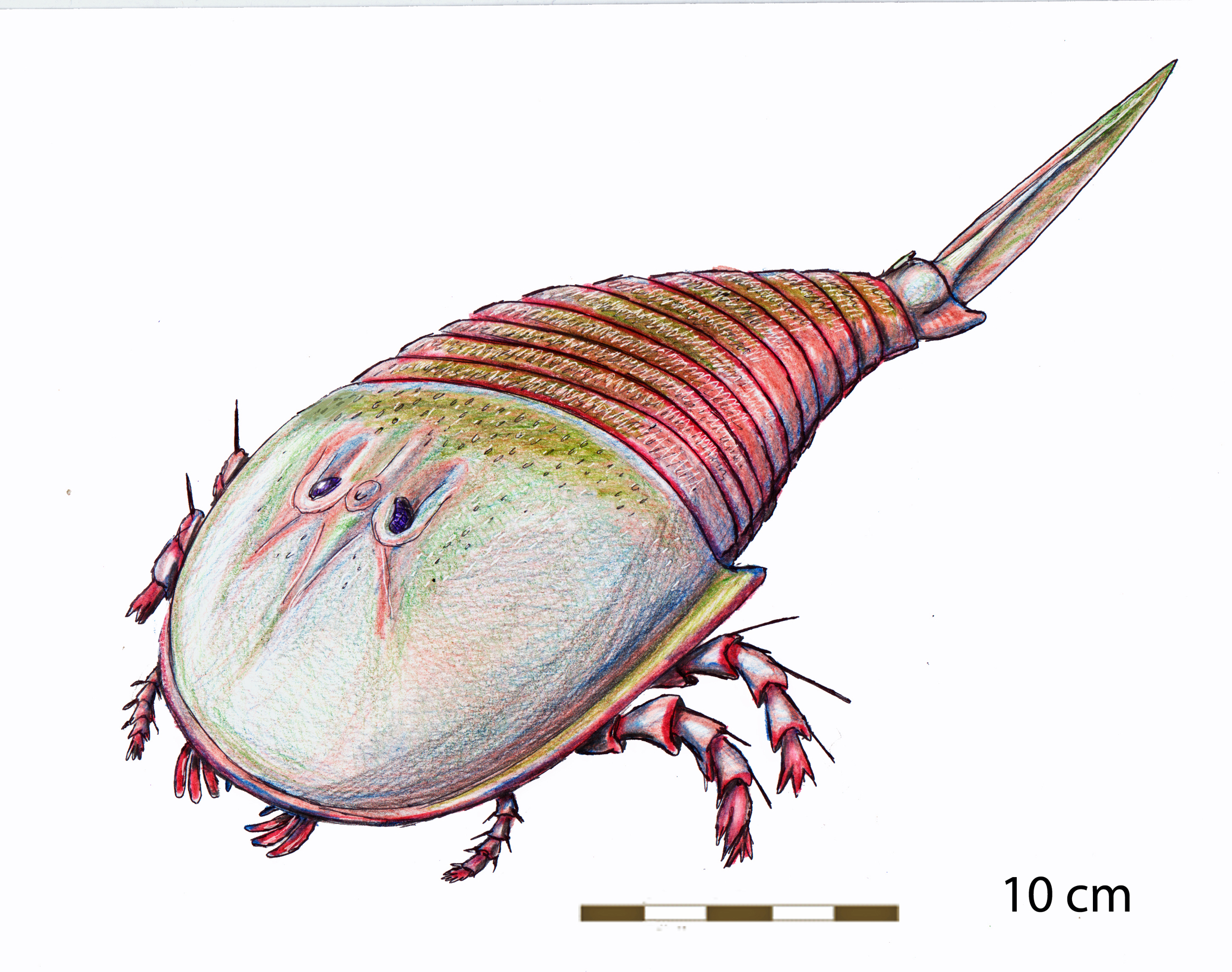
Restoration of C. oculatus. Missing elements are based on closely related hibbertopterids.

Classified as a member of the hibbertopterid family of eurypterids, Campylocephalus was overall similar to the other members of the family. It was a large, broad and heavy creature quite unlike most earlier and more famous swimming eurypterids such as Pterygotus and Eurypterus. As a member of the stylonurine suborder, Campylocephalus completely lacked swimming paddles.

Several distinguishing features separate Campylocephalus from other genera in its family, in particular from the closely related Hibbertopterus. Campylocephalus had a subelliptical (almost elliptical) prosoma (head), which was subsemicircular (almost shaped like a semicircle) and strongly convex, being at its broadest in the midsection. The compound eyes of Campylocephalus were laterally placed (on the sides of the head) and were separated from each other by inflated lobes in the middle. Behind the eyes on the carapace (the exoskeleton segment covering the head) there were some further lobe-like structures referred to as palpebral lobes.

As with the prosoma, the tergites (segments on the upper side of the body) of the abdomen were convex in shape, and possessed articular processes (projecting structures that helped the segments to fit together). The appendages (limbs) of Campylocephalus are only very rarely preserved and are as such almost completely unknown.

Due to just how incomplete the fossil remains referred to Campylocephalus are, determining its size is difficult and as of yet, no formal published size estimates exist for either the type species C. oculatus or the species C. salmi. The sole known fossil remains of C. permianus, a massive incomplete carapace, suggests a very large eurypterid, potentially reaching lengths of 1.4 metres (4.6 feet).

In C. oculatus, the eyes were semilunar in shape (almost moon-shaped) and placed near the middle of the carapace, with small ocelli (light-sensitive simple eyes) between them. Its carapace had small irregular prominences, a rounded anterior edge and an indented posterior edge. The thoracic segments (segments of the thorax) of the species were straight and narrow. The eyes of C. salmi were similar, being placed very close together. The eyes were also a distinguishing feature in C. permianus, where they were placed more posteriorly than in the other species.

== History of research ==
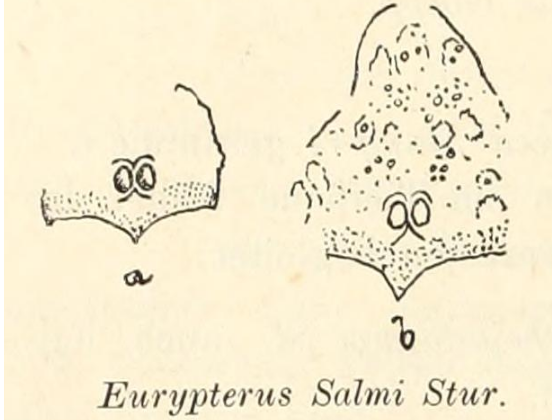
Drawings of fragmentary fossil carapaces of C. salmi, then referred to as Eurypterus salmi, by Dionýs Štúr (1877).

Fossils today recognized as belonging to Campylocephalus were first described in 1838 as belonging to a species of the genus Limulus, the same genus as the modern atlantic horseshoe crab, by Russian paleontologist Stepan S. Kutorga. Citing similarities with members of the modern genus in the appearance and anatomy of the somewhat incomplete fossil, Kutorga named it Limulus oculatus.

Scottish naturalist John Scouler described the genus Eidothea in 1831 based on a single fossil prosoma from Scotland, but did not grant it any specific name. Creating a genus with no species goes against orthodox zoological nomenclature, specifically conflicting for instance with Opinion 65 of the International Commission on Zoological Nomenclature;

If an author designates a certain species as genotype, it is to be assumed that his determination of the species is correct; if a case presents itself in which it appears that an author has based his genus on certain definite specimens, rather than upon a species, it would be well to submit the case, with full details, to the Commission. At the present moment, it is difficult to lay down a general rule.

— Opinions and declarations rendered by the International Commission on Zoological Nomenclature (1958).

Any taxonomical difficulties implied with Scouler's designation were easily avoided, however, by the discovery that the genus name was preoccupied by a genus of molluscs described in 1826. Nevertheless, the name Eidothea would be associated with the Scottish eurypterid species Eurypterus scouleri, with a near identical prosoma, described in 1836.

In 1860 French paleontologist Edouard D'Eichwald recognized that the carapace and thoracic segments which had been described by Kutorga were quite distinct from Limulus, and thus a new genus was named to contain Limulus oculatus, dubbed by D'Eichwald as Campylocephalus. This generic name is composed of the Greek words καμπύλος (kampýlos), meaning "curved", and κεφαλή (kephalē), meaning "head".

The second species of Campylocephalus to be described, C. salmi, was named as a species of the quite distantly related Eurypterus by the Slovak geologist and paleontologist Dionýs Štúr in 1877. Štúr's description was based on two incomplete fossil carapaces. The first fragmentary carapace only preserved the lower part of the head, ending in two pointed and concave arches. The eyes of this carapace were close together, in the middle of the carapace, and on a triangularly shaped elevated portion similar to some specimens of the related Hibbertopterus scouleri. In the second carapace specimen, the carapace began to stretch forward above the eyes. Both of these fossils also possessed protuberances of different sizes across the exoskeleton, showing vague forms and shapes not seen in other specimens of the genus.

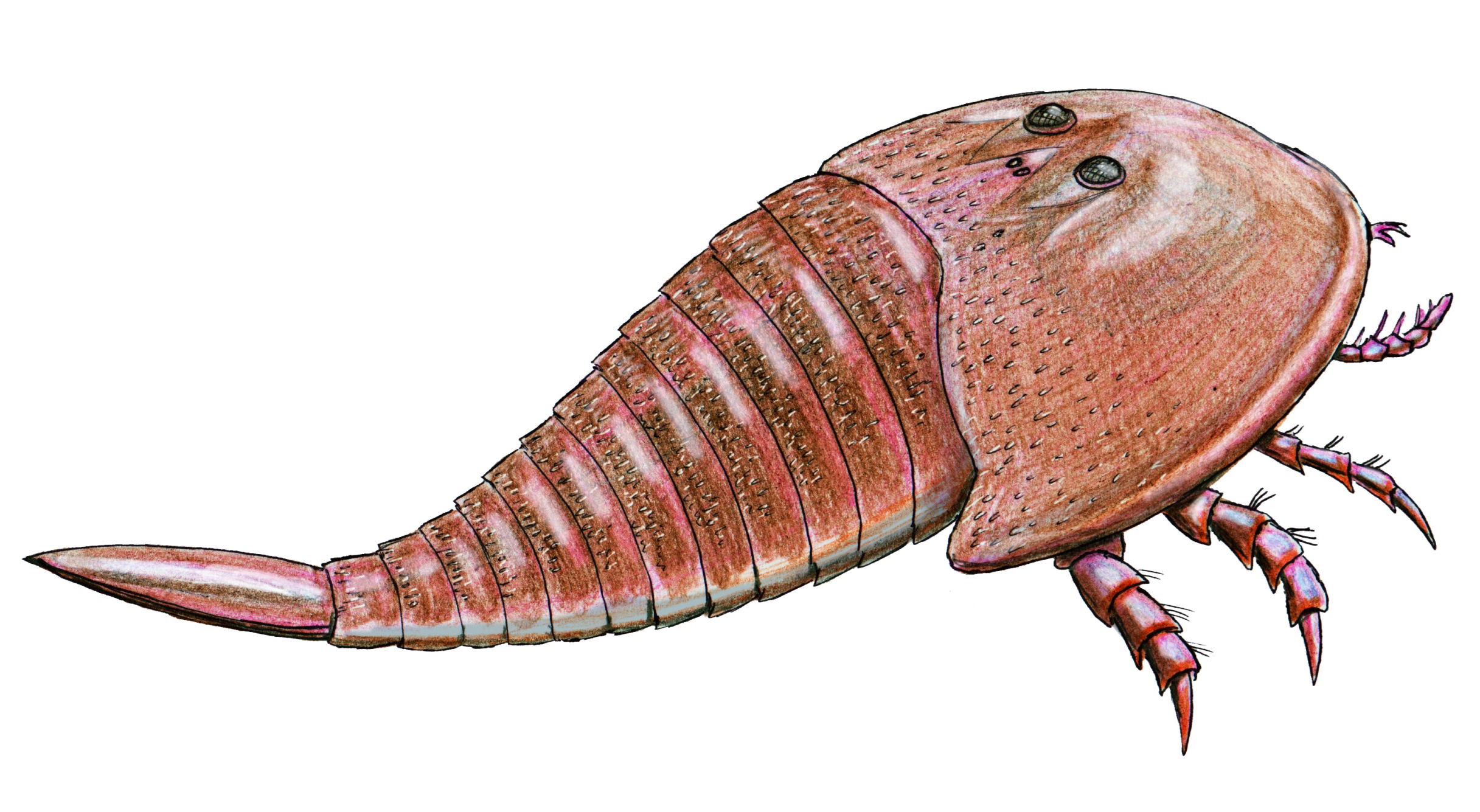
Reconstruction of the closely related Hibbertopterus scouleri, once considered to be a species of Campylocephalus.

Fossils of Eurypterus scouleri were compared to the carapace described by Kutorga in 1838 by Norwegian paleontologist Leif Størmer in 1951, who concluded that the two were clearly congeneric. At this point, D'Eichwald had already recognized the fossils designated as "Eidothea" by Scouler as representatives of Campylocephalus. As such, E. scouleri was classified as Campylocephalus scouleri. Though the legs of Campylocephalus were still unknown at the time, even with the addition of the Scottish species, any grouping with other genera would have to be made using features of the carapace. Comparing the ornamentation of the carapace to other eurypterids, Størmer found it to be similar to the genus Tarsopterella (where the legs were also more or less unknown) which allowed Campylocephalus to be firmly placed within the family Stylonuridae (which would later be raised to become the suborder Stylonurina, not to be confused with the presently recognized eurypterid family Stylonuridae).

English paleontologist Charles D. Waterston was the first to suggest that C. scouleri perhaps shouldn't be considered as congeneric with Campylocephalus, raising the issue in a 1958 paper. He posited that though the dorsal anatomy of the prosoma was quite similar between C. scouleri and C. oculatus, the designated type species, multiple well-preserved fossils had allowed for detailed research into the ventral anatomy and appendages of C. scouleri since the two had been placed in the same genus, whilst the ventral anatomy and appendages of C. oculatus remained unknown. A year later, in 1959, American paleontologist Erik Norman Kjellesvig-Waering created the new genus Hibbertopterus to contain C. scouleri (now Hibbertopterus scouleri) and placed both genera within the family Hibbertopteridae.

Described by Russian paleontologist Alexey G. Ponomarenko in 1985, C. permianus was originally named as a species of Hibbertopterus. The only known specimen of this species is the holotype, PIN N1209/2, an incomplete carapace, but Ponomarenko could list several features that distinguished it from other species referred to Hibbertopterus. Among these were most prominently the posterior position of the lateral eyes and said eyes not being circular in shape. In 2012, American paleontologist James C. Lamsdell could demonstrate that these unique features were actually diagnostic features of the genus Campylocephalus and thus reclassified it as its current combination. Though Ponomarenko had mentioned several features that also distinguished C. permianus from the then currently recognized species of Campylocephalus, including a different carapace shape and some thickening of the exoskeleton around the eyes, Lamsdell determined that these distinctions were not valid. In the view of Lamsdell, specimens of the type species C. oculatus are not well preserved enough to determine the precise structure of the eyes and because fossils of its carapace are either flattened or incomplete, its shape can not be ascertained with complete accuracy.

== Classification ==
Campylocephalus is classified as part of the family Hibbertopteridae, a family of eurypterids within the superfamily Mycteropoidea, alongside the genera Hibbertopterus and Vernonopterus. The genus contains three species; C. oculatus and C. permianus from the Permian of Russia and C. salmi from the Carboniferous of the Czech Republic. The classification of C. salmi is considered somewhat uncertain, with C. salmi being fragmentary (as all other species of the genus) and possessing some unique features (e.g. the differently sized protuberances around the carapace).

The hibbertopterids are united as a group by being large mycteropoids with broad prosomas, a hastate (e.g. shaped like a gladius, a Roman sword) telson (which was the posteriormost division of the body) with paired keels on the ventral side, ornamentation consisting of scales or other similar structures on the exoskeleton, the fourth pair of appendages possessing spines, the more posterior tergites of the abdomen possessing tongue-shaped scales near their edges and there being lobes positioned posterolaterally (posteriorly on both sides) on the prosoma.

The features of Campylocephalus and Vernonopterus makes it clear that both genera represent hibbertopterid eurypterids, but the incomplete nature of all fossil specimens referred to them make any further study of the precise phylogenetic relationships within the Hibbertopteridae difficult. Both genera could even represent synonyms of Hibbertopterus itself, though the highly incomplete nature of their remains again makes that hypothesis impossible to confirm.

The cladogram below is adapted from Lamsdell (2012), collapsed to only show the superfamily Mycteropoidea.

- Mycteropoidea
  - Drepanopteridae
    - Drepanopterus pentlandicus
    - - Drepanopterus abonensis
      - Drepanopterus odontospathus
  - - Mycteroptidae
      - Woodwardopterus scabrosus
      - - Mycterops mathieui
        - - Hastimima whitei
          - Megarachne servinei
    - Hibbertopteridae
      - Campylocephalus oculatus
      - - Hibbertopterus scouleri
        - Hibbertopterus wittebergensis

== Paleoecology ==
The estimated size of C. permianus compared to a human

Hibbertopterids such as Campylocephalus were sweep-feeders, having modified spines on their forward-facing prosomal appendages that allowed them to rake through the substrate of their living environments. Though sweep-feeding was used as a strategy by many genera within the Stylonurina, it was most developed within the hibbertopterids, which possessed blades on the second, third and fourth pair of appendages. Some species of the closely related Hibbertopterus had specialized comb-like rachis (shafts) that were able to entrap small prey and other organic food particles.

Though they would have been slow owing to their massive size and robust form, studies on Hibbertopterus footprints discovered in Scotland have demonstrated that hibbertopterids would have been able to walk on land for at least short periods of time. The tracks discovered indicate that they would have utilized a lumbering, jerking and dragging movement and that the keeled belly and the telson left a central groove behind. Some studies suggest that eurypterids possessed a dual respiratory system, which would have allowed for this kind of occasional terrestrial movement.

C. salmi is known from the Ostrava Formation of the Czech Republic and would have lived during the Arnsbergian age (326.4–318.1 million years ago) of the Carboniferous period. The deposits were the eurypterid fossils were found are lacustrine, meaning that they formed on the bottom of an ancient lake. Spiders of the genus Eophrynus, part of the extinct arachnid order Trigonotarbida, are known from the same location and age, and numerous anthozoans (the group that contains animals such as corals and sea anemones) are known from the same age within the Ostrava Formation.

It is difficult to make any statements on the paleoecology of the type species, C. oculatus, as the precise location and dating of the fossil specimen remains somewhat unclear. Most accounts place the fossil as having been found at a location named Dourasovo in Russia and being from the Guadalupian epoch (272.3–259.8 million years ago) of the Permian period.

The species of C. permianus is one of the latest known surviving eurypterid species. The sole fossil representing the species was discovered in the Komi Autonomous Soviet Socialist Republic of the Soviet Union (the modern Komi Republic of Russia) in deposits of approximately the age of the Permian–Triassic extinction event 251.9 million years ago. In the Permian, Komi would have been a coastal region of the supercontinent Pangaea. Though no other fossils of the exact same age have been reported, other Permian-age life known from the region include bryozoans and bivalves.

By the beginning of the Permian, the eurypterids were already in decline relative to what their numbers and diversity had once been. The group was one of many heavily affected by the Late Devonian extinction, which rendered all but a single genus of eurypterine (those with swimming paddles) eurypterids extinct (Adelophthalmus). Of the 16 eurypterid families that had lived during the beginning of the Devonian period, three families survived and persisted into the Carboniferous period, all of which contained only non-marine species. By the Permian, only four genera were still alive; Adelophthalmus (a adelophthalmid), Hastimima and possibly Woodwardopterus (mycteroptids), and Campylocephalus itself. Both Adelophthalmus and Hastimima went extinct during the Early Permian, which left Campylocephalus as one of only two living genera of eurypterids for more than 20 million years until its own extinction in the Permian–Triassic extinction event, though the describers of the other possible Late Permian eurypterid (or true scorpion) Woodwardopterus freemanorum argued that C. permianus can be dated to the Kungurian-Roadian stages at the latest.

== See also ==
- List of eurypterid genera
- Timeline of eurypterid research
