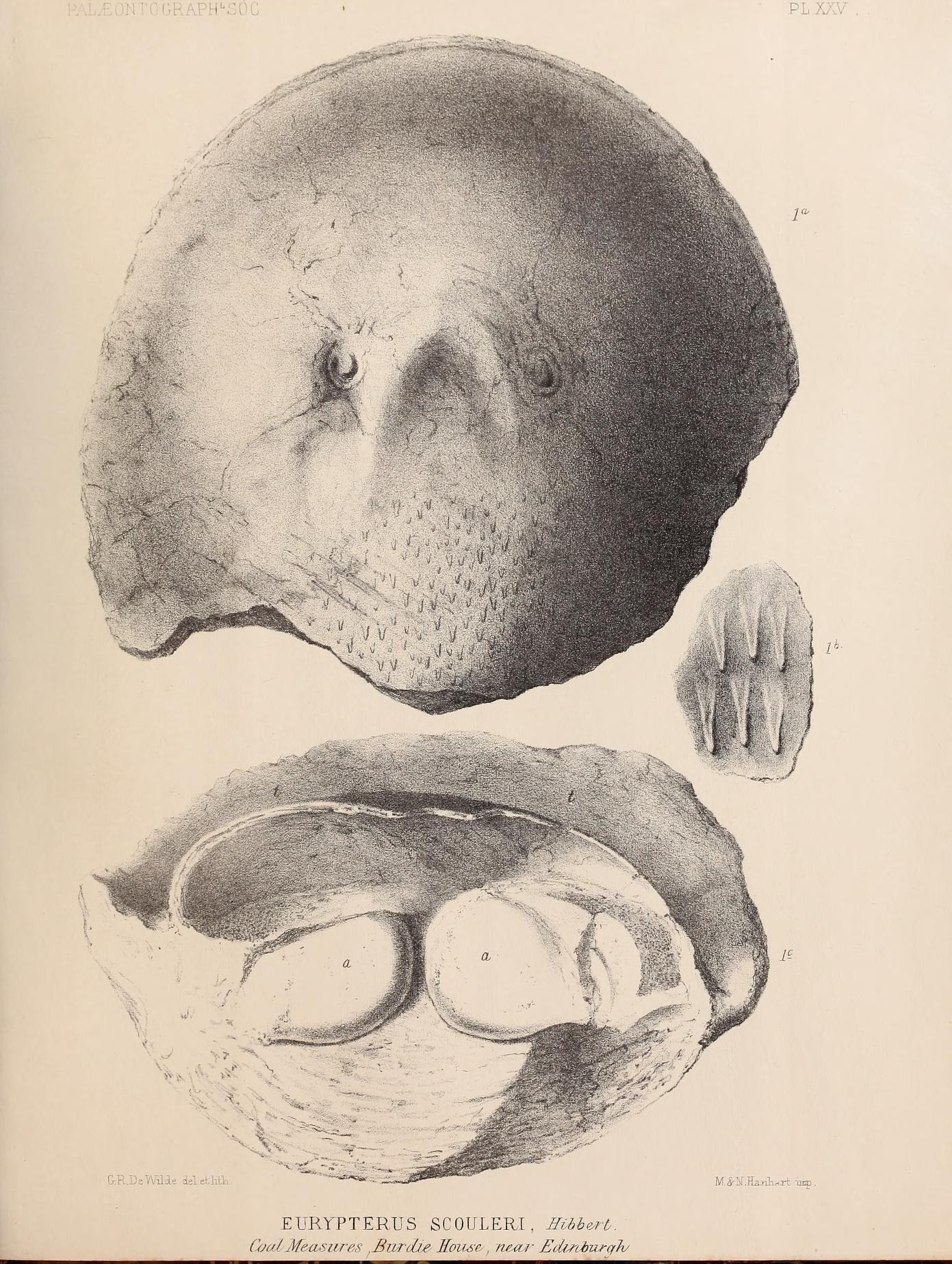
- Drawings of the carapace of Hibbertopterus scouleri, from above (upper drawing) and below (lower drawing) and of the ornamentation of the posterior side of the head (enlarged, left) by Henry Woodward, 1866-1878.

Scientific classification
- Kingdom: Animalia
- Phylum: Arthropoda
- Subphylum: Chelicerata
- Order: †Eurypterida
- Suborder: †Stylonurina
- Superfamily: †Mycteropoidea
- Family: †Hibbertopteridae; Kjellesvig-Waering, 1959

Type genus
- †Hibbertopterus Kjellesvig-Waering, 1959

Genera
- †Campylocephalus; †?Cyrtoctenus; †?Dunsopterus; †?Glyptoscorpius; †Hibbertopterus; †?Vernonopterus

Synonyms
- Cyrtoctenidae Waterston et al., 1985

= Hibbertopteridae =

Hibbertopteridae Temporal range: Middle Devonian - Middle Permian, 387.7–267 Ma

Extinct family of arthropods

Hibbertopteridae (the name deriving from the type genus Hibbertopterus, meaning "Hibbert's wing") is a family of eurypterids, an extinct group of aquatic arthropods. They were members of the superfamily Mycteropoidea. Hibbertopterids were large, broad and heavy animals unlike virtually every other group of eurypterids, which are commonly streamlined and lightweight. Their bizarre morphology is so unusual that they in the past have been thought to represent an entirely distinct order of chelicerates. Fossils of the family first appear in deposits of the Middle Devonian, and the last known fossils representing hibbertopterids are known from deposits of the Permian period. The hibbertopterids represent the last known living eurypterids, with the latest known definitive species, Campylocephalus permianus, being argued to have gone extinct during the late Early Permian-early Middle Permian (Kungurian-Roadian stages) or the Late Permian; the other possible Late Permian taxon, Woodwardopterus freemanorum, may instead represent a true scorpion.

Although eurypterids are commonly known as "sea scorpions", hibbertopterids inhabited freshwater swamps and rivers and were unable to swim since they lacked swimming paddles, a feature they shared with their entire suborder, the Stylonurina. Hibbertopterids fed using a method referred to as sweep-feeding, in which the animal would rake through the soft sediment of their substrate with specialised blades on their forward-facing appendages to capture small invertebrates. Though this method of feeding was present in other mycteropoids and in stylonuroids, it was at its most advanced stage within the derived Hibbertopteridae.

The hibbertopterids were the largest of all stylonurine eurypterids, with both Hibbertopterus at 180–200 centimetres (5.9–6.6 ft) and Campylocephalus at 140 centimetres (4.6 feet) representing giant eurypterids in their own right. Though longer eurypterids are known from the eurypterine suborder, notably the largest known arthropod of all time, Jaekelopterus, at 230–260 centimetres (7.5–8.5 ft), hibbertopterids were far bulkier than any of the largest eurypterine eurypterids and as such likely represent the overall heaviest animals in the order.

== Description ==
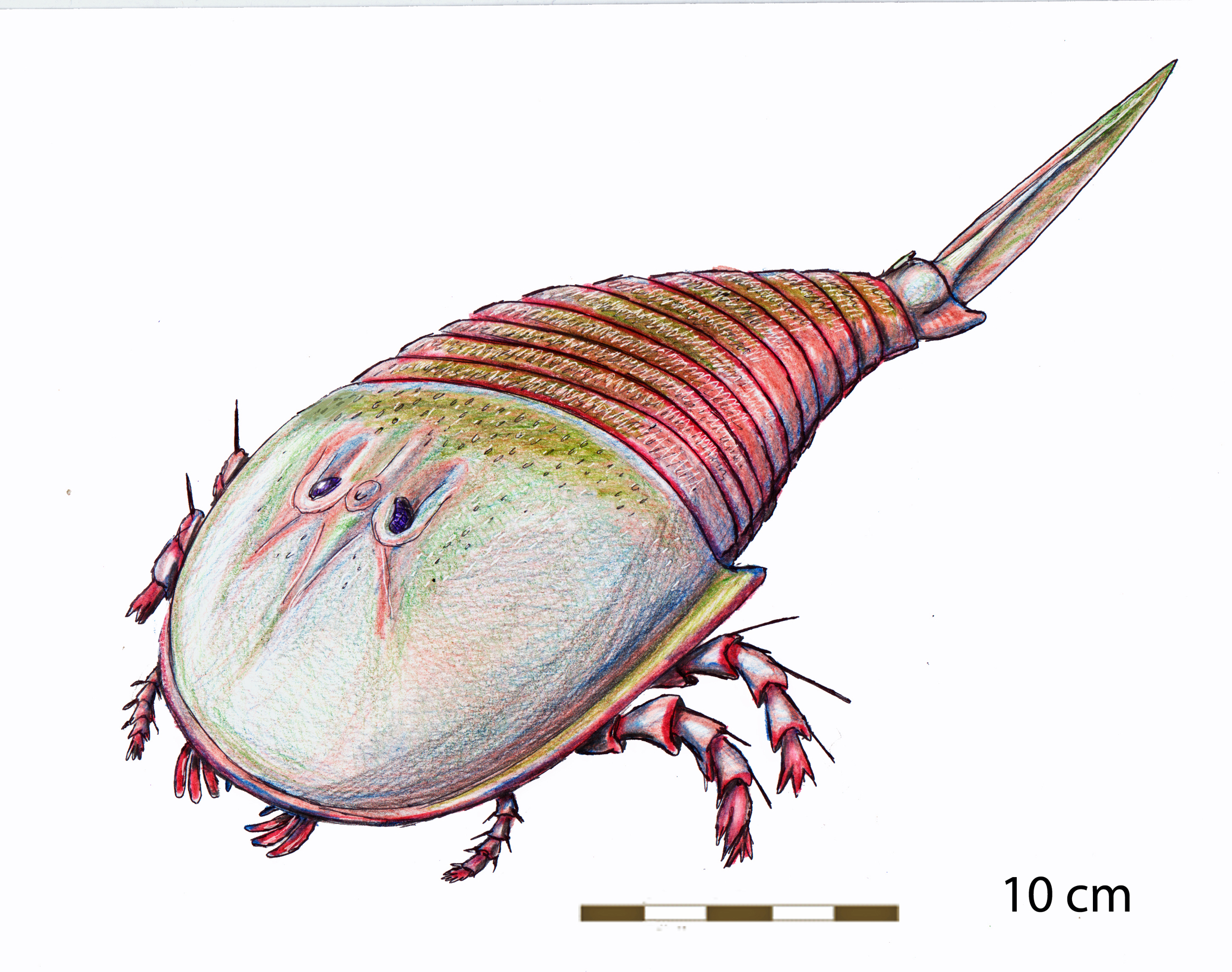
Restoration of Campylocephalus.

Hibbertopterids were large mycteropoid eurypterids characterised by their broad prosomas (heads), hastate (e.g. shaped like a gladius, a Roman sword) telsons (which were the posteriormost division of the body) with paired keels and a covering of ornamentation in the shape of scales across their exoskeletons. More shared features are the presence of tongue-shaped scales on the margins of the tergites of the opisthosoma (the abdomen) and that the fourth pair of appendages were covered in spines. The prosoma of the hibbertopterids possessed lobes that were positioned posterolaterally (posteriorly on both sides).

Although Vernonopterus has been estimated to have reached lengths of "just" 50 centimetres (19.7 inches), both Campylocephalus and Hibbertopterus represent true giant eurypterids. The largest specimens of Campylocephalus suggests a size of 140 centimetres (4.6 feet) and at 180–200 centimetres (5.9–6.6 ft), Hibbertopterus scouleri was the largest eurypterid in the entire stylonurine suborder. That hibbertopterids were so broad and compact probably means they were the overall heaviest eurypterids, surpassing longer forms, such as the light-weight pterygotids, in weight.

Compared to other eurypterids, hibbertopterids were highly unusual. Their broad and heavy bodies go against the general eurypterid trend of being streamlined and lightweight and like all other stylonurine eurypterids, they lack swimming paddles. Out of their six pairs of limbs, the second, third and fourth pairs were forward-facing and specialised for gathering food. The leg segments of these limbs were covered with long spines and their ends were covered with sensory organs. The fourth pair of limbs, although also used in feeding, was also used for locomotion, as were pairs five and six. As such, hibbertopterids would have been hexapods (walking on six legs).

Due to the fragmentary nature of both Campylocephalus and Vernonopterus, confidently establishing distinguishing features between the three genera is difficult. Distinguishing Campylocephalus from Hibbertopterus is primarily the fact that the carapace (exoskeleton covering the head) of Campylocephalus is slightly narrower and is broadest at its midsection, rather than at the part which connects to the rest of the body (as it is in Hibbertopterus). The fragmentary Vernonopterus can be distinguished from the others by its distinctive and unique ornamentation.

Preserved cuticle of hibbertopterids is thinner than what is expected of arthropods of their size, though this might be explained by the possibility that only an outer exocuticular region has been preserved in their fossils.

== Classification ==
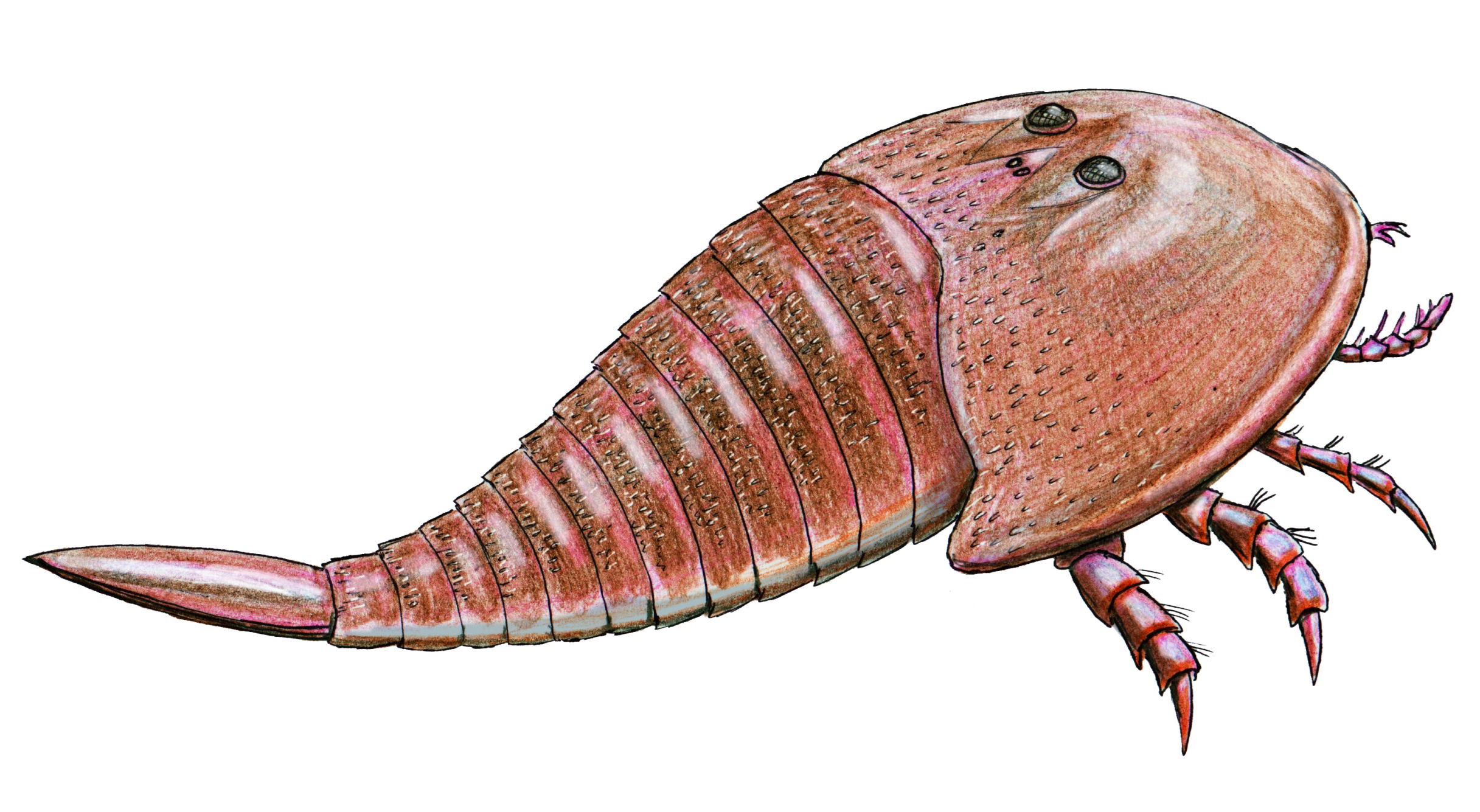
Restoration of Hibbertopterus.

The hibbertopterids are classified as part of the superfamily Mycteropoidea within the eurypterid suborder Stylonurina. The morphology of the hibbertopterids was so unusual that they have been thought to be an order separate to Eurypterida. Recent work however confirms their placement in Stylonurina, closely related to Drepanopterus and the Mycteroptidae.

Internal hibbertopterid systematics are unresolved and disputed, and the number of genera recognized beside ths type genus, Hibbertopterus, varies greatly between studies. The 2018 World Spider Catalog recognizes Campylocephalus, Hibbertopterus, and Vernonopterus. Both Campylocephalus and Vernonopterus have been suggested to be synonyms of Hibbertopterus itself, which would make the family monotypic (containing only one immediately subordinate taxon), though the incomplete nature of their remains makes that hypothesis impossible to confirm.

Up until recently the two genera Cyrtoctenus and Dunsopterus were also recognised as valid and distinct hibbertopterid genera, but the modern consensus is that they represent ontogenetic stages (different developmental stages of the animal throughout its life) of Hibbertopterus. The genus Hastimima, sometimes classified as part of the Hibbertopteridae, has been recovered as part of the Mycteroptidae (the closest relatives of the hibbertopterids) in recent analyses. In 2023, Braddy et al. rejected the synonymy of Hibbertopterus and Cyrtoctenus, placed Hastimima as a possible synonym of Cyrtoctenus, and synonymized Hibbertopterus, Dunsopterus, and Vernonopterus. In 2025, Lamsdell recognized four hibbertopterid genera: Campylocephalus, Dunsopterus, Glyptoscorpius (=Vernonopterus), and Hibbertopterus (=Cyrtoctenus).

The cladogram below is adapted from Lamsdell (2012), collapsed to only show the superfamily Mycteropoidea.

- Mycteropoidea
  - Drepanopteridae
    - Drepanopterus pentlandicus
    - - Drepanopterus abonensis
      - Drepanopterus odontospathus
  - - Mycteroptidae
      - Woodwardopterus scabrosus
      - - Mycterops mathieui
        - - Hastimima whitei
          - Megarachne servinei
    - Hibbertopteridae
      - Campylocephalus oculatus
      - - Hibbertopterus scouleri
        - Hibbertopterus wittebergensis

== Palaeoecology ==
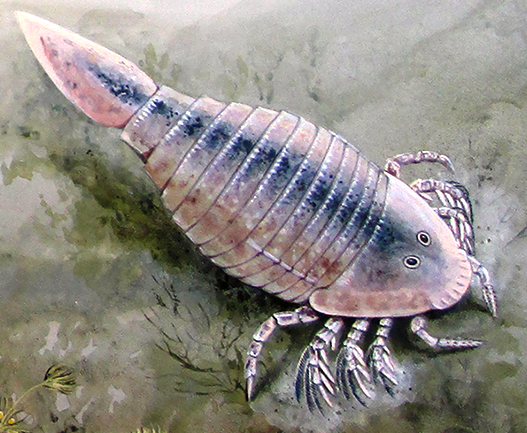
Reconstruction of undescribed hibbertopterid ("cyrtoctenid") eurypterid from Waterloo Farm lagerstätte on substrate of non-marine environment

The hibbertopterids were derived sweep-feeders, inhabiting freshwater swamps and rivers and feeding by raking through the soft sediment with blades on their anterior appendages to capture small invertebrates.

Sweep-feeding strategies evolved independently in two of the four stylonurine superfamilies, the Stylonuroidea and the Mycteropoidea. In both superfamilies, the adaptations to this lifestyle involves modifications to the spines on their anterior prosomal appendages for raking through the substrate of their habitats. Stylonuroids have fixed spines on appendages II-IV which could have been used as dragnets to rake through the sediments and thus entangling anything in their way. Mycteropoidea show even more extreme adaptations towards a sweep-feeding lifestyle. These adaptations are taken to an even further extreme within the Hibbertopteridae, with appendage IV possessing a blade alongside the appendages II-III (which also have blades in other hibbertopteroids).

The coxae in Hibbertopterus are reduced, leading to part of the food masticatory process being assumed by the laden (plates overlaying the coxae). Some of its species have even further adaptations towards sweep-feeding than other mycteropoids, with its blades modified into comb-like rachis that could entrap smaller prey or other organic food particles. With its coxae being large, it is likely that some species of Hibbertopterus would also feed on relatively large invertebrates when able to.
