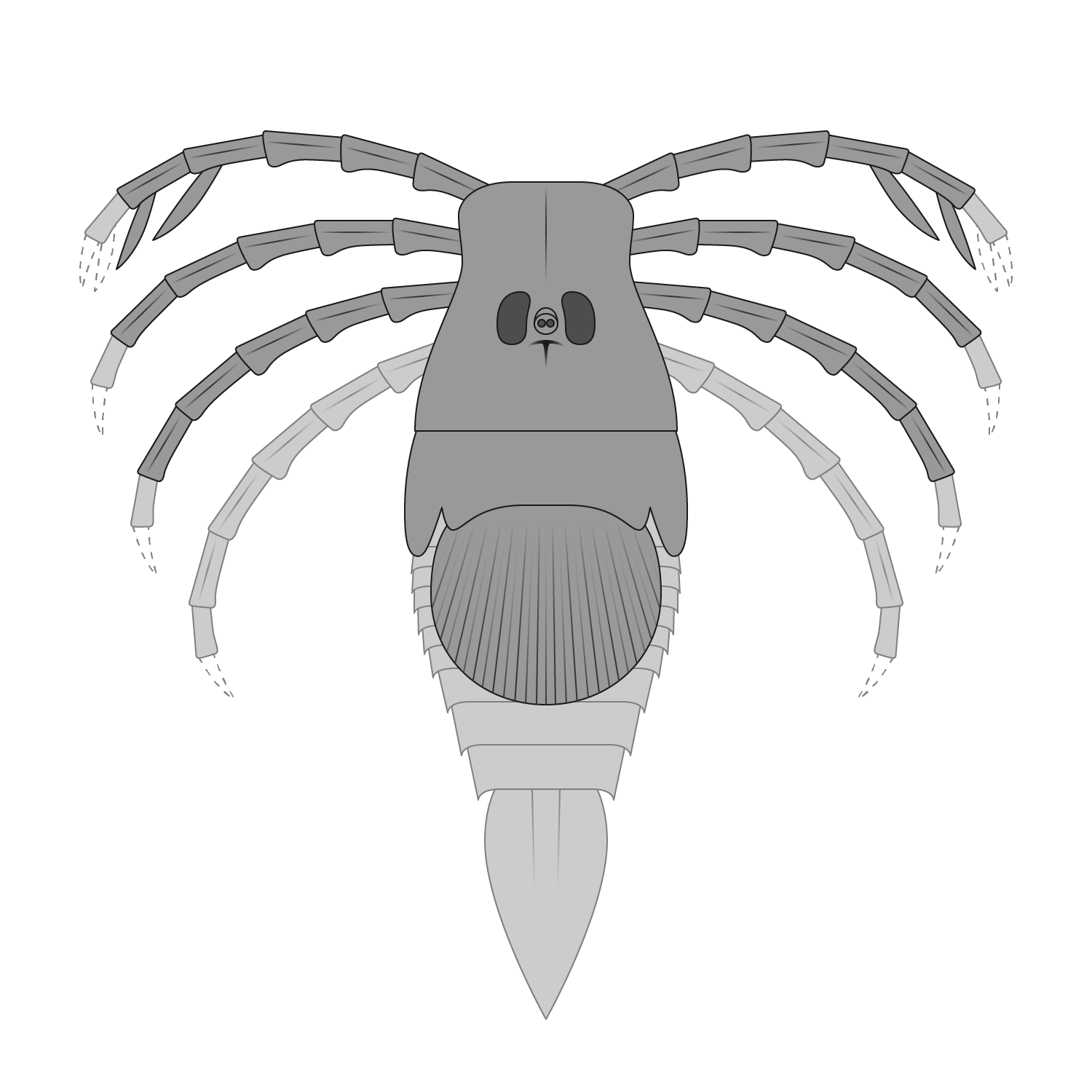
- Reconstruction of Megarachne servinei.

Scientific classification
- Kingdom: Animalia
- Phylum: Arthropoda
- Subphylum: Chelicerata
- Order: †Eurypterida
- Suborder: †Stylonurina
- Superfamily: †Mycteropoidea
- Family: †Mycteroptidae; Cope, 1886

Type genus
- Mycterops Cope, 1886

Genera
- †Hastimima; †Megarachne; †Mycterops; †Woodwardopterus

Synonyms
- Megarachnidae Hünicken, 1980; Woodwardopteridae Kjellesvig-Waering, 1959

= Mycteroptidae =

Mycteroptidae Temporal range: Early Carboniferous-Early Permian, 320–274.4 Ma

Extinct family of arthropods

Mycteroptidae or Mycteropidae are a family of eurypterids, a group of extinct chelicerate arthropods commonly known as "sea scorpions". The family is one of three families contained in the superfamily Mycteropoidea (along with Hibbertopteridae and Drepanopteridae), which in turn is one of four superfamilies classified as part of the suborder Stylonurina.

Mycteroptids were sweep-feeding eurypterids definitively known from the Early Carboniferous to the Early Permian; the possible Late Permian eurypterid Woodwardopterus freemanorum may instead represent a true scorpion.

== Description ==
Mycteroptids were medium-sized to fairly large mycteropoids with parabolic prosoma and a hastate telson with paired ventral keels. They had a culticular ornament of scales or mucrones and unlike the hibbertopterids, appendage IV was non-spiniferous. The first and second opisthosomal tergites were strongly developed and elongated. The heads of mycteroptids were subtrapezoid in shape with small compound eyes.

Mycteroptids only used appendages II and III to capture prey, whilst hibberopterids used II, III and IV.

== Genera and species ==
Three of the four genera included in the Mycteroptidae, Mycterops, Woodwardopterus and Megarachne might represent different ontogenetic stages of each other based on the sizes of the referred specimens and the patterns of mucronation. This would sink the genera Woodwardopterus and Megarachne into Mycterops.

Family Mycteroptidae Cope, 1886

- Mycterops Cope, 1886
  - Mycterops matthieui Pruvost, 1924
  - Mycterops ordinatus Cope, 1886
- Woodwardopterus Kjellesvig-Waering, 1959
  - Woodwardopterus scabrosus (Woodward, 1887)
  - Woodwardopterus freemanorum? Poschmanna & Rozefelds, 2022
- Megarachne Hünicken, 1980
  - Megarachne servinei Hünicken, 1980
- Hastimima White, 1908
  - Hastimima whitei White, 1908

== See also ==
- List of eurypterids
- Stylonurina
- Hibbertopteroidea
- Hibbertopteridae
