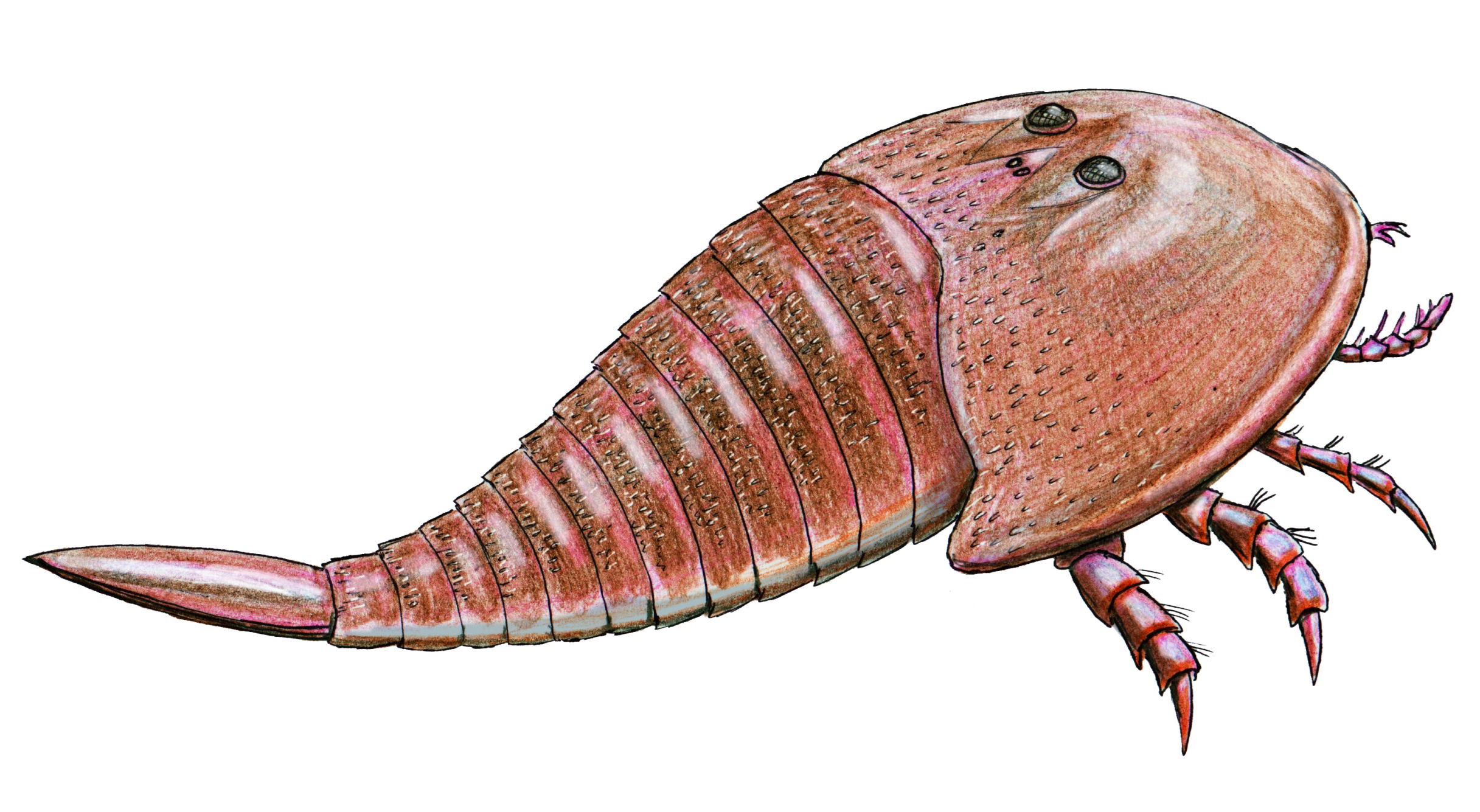
- Reconstruction of Hibbertopterus, a hibbertopterid

Scientific classification
- Kingdom: Animalia
- Phylum: Arthropoda
- Subphylum: Chelicerata
- Order: †Eurypterida
- Suborder: †Stylonurina
- Superfamily: †Mycteropoidea; Cope, 1886

Families
- †Drepanopteridae; †Hibbertopteridae; †Mycteroptidae

Synonyms
- Drepanopteroidea Kjellesvig-Waering, 1966; Hibbertopteroidea Kjellesvig-Waering, 1959; Woodwardopteroidea Kjellesvig-Waering, 1959

= Mycteropoidea =

Mycteropoidea Temporal range: Early Silurian - Middle Permian, 442–267 Ma

Extinct superfamily of arthropods

Mycteropoidea is an extinct superfamily of eurypterids, an extinct group of chelicerate arthropods commonly known as "sea scorpions". It is one of four superfamilies classified as part of the suborder Stylonurina. Mycteropoids have been recovered from Europe, Russia, South America and South Africa. Mycteropoid specimens are often fragmentary, making it difficult to establish relationships between the included taxa. Only two mycteropoid taxa are known from reasonable complete remains, Hibbertopterus scouleri and H. wittebergensis.

Mycteropoids were large bizarre Eurypterids found from the Early Silurian to the Permian period. The latest definitive species, Campylocephalus permianus, is argued to have gone extinct during the late Early Permian-early Middle Permian (Kungurian-Roadian stages) or the Late Permian; the other possible Late Permian taxon, Woodwardopterus freemanorum, may instead represent a true scorpion. They were sweep feeders, inhabiting freshwater swamps and rivers, feeding by raking through the soft sediment with blades on their anterior appendages to capture small invertebrates. Their morphology was so unusual that they have been thought to be an order separate to Eurypterida. Recent work however confirms them to be derived members of the suborder Stylonurina, with the genus Drepanopterus being a basal member of their superfamily.

The mycteropoids are important within eurypterid evolutionary history as the last group of eurypterids to experience a significant radiation in diversity at the genus level (during the Late Devonian and Carboniferous) as well as being the latest known surviving members of the group, going extinct during the Permian-Triassic extinction event.

== Description ==
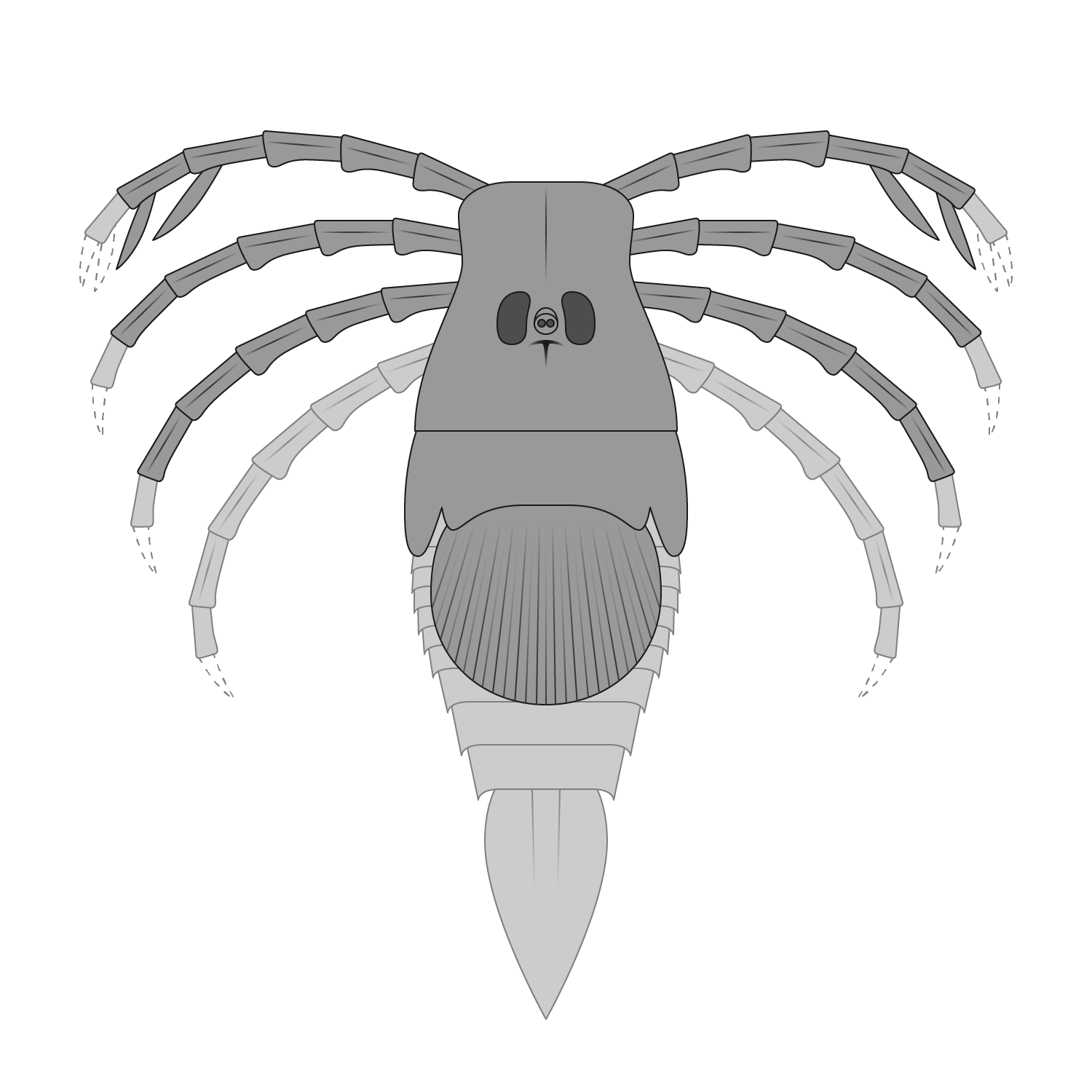
Reconstruction of Megarachne, a mycteroptid once thought to have been a giant spider.

Mycteropoids are diagnosed as stylonurines with a posterior cleft on the metastoma and rounded lenses overlaying the lateral eyes as well as having anterior prosomal appendages modified for sweep-feeding.

Sweep-feeding strategies evolved independently in two of the four stylonurine superfamilies, the Stylonuroidea and the Mycteropoidea. In both superfamilies, the adaptations to this lifestyle involves modifications to the spines on their anterior prosomal appendages for raking through the substrate of their habitats. Stylonuroids have fixed spines on appendages II-IV which could have been used as dragnets to rake through the sediments and thus entangling anything in their way. Mycteropoids show even more extreme adaptations towards a sweep-feeding lifestyle.

They possess blades on prosomal appendages II-III (and IV within the Hibbertopteridae), highly distinct from flattened spines such as in the kokomopteroid Hallipterus, being laterally expanded with a blunt and rounded termination that has sensory setae. The tactile function of these might have allowed mycteropoids to select prey from the sediments in a way that stylonuroids could not.

In the mycteroptids, appendages II and III were used for prey capture, whilst hibbertopterids also used appendage IV, while also retaining its use as a leg for walking. The coxae in Hibbertopterus are reduced, leading to part of the food masticatory process being assumed by the laden (plates overlaying the coxae). Some species of Hibbertopterus have even further adaptations towards sweep-feeding than other mycteropoids, with its blades modified into comb-like rachis that could entrap smaller prey or other organic food particles. With its coxae being large, it is likely that some species of Hibbertopterus would also feed on relatively large invertebrates when able to.

== Systematics and genera ==
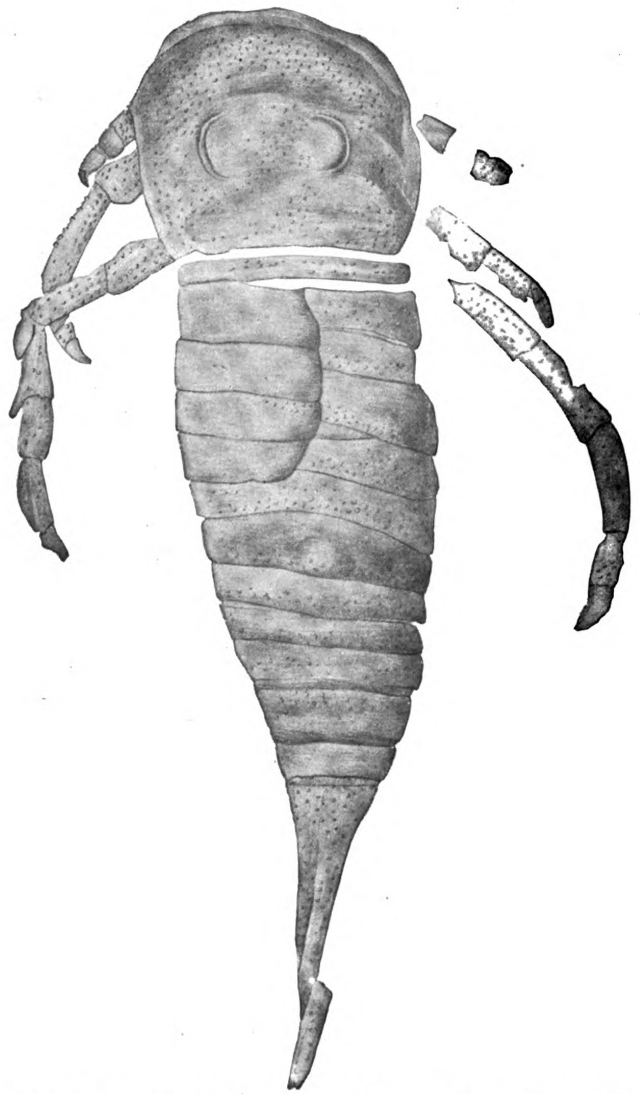
Fossil of Drepanopterus, the earliest known and most basal mycteropoid.

Mycteropoids are so derived and unusual that their unique morphology on occasion has prompted researchers to place them as an order separate to Eurypterida. Recent research however resolve them as a sister group to Kokomopteroidea, united by a median ridge on the carapace between the lateral eyes and a distal thickening to the podomeres of the prosomal appendages, within the Stylonurina suborder of eurypterids.

Drepanopterus, the only member of the family Drepanopteridae, was resolved as a sister taxon to all other mycteropoids and is also the earliest known member of the group, occurring from the Lower Silurian to the Upper Devonian. Drepanopterus also shares certain characteristics with the kokomopteroids (such as having a clavate telson) and other mycteropoids (a posteriorly cleft metastoma and having blades on the anterior prosomal appendages). Other mycteropoids are classified within one of two families, the Hibbertopteridae or the Mycteroptidae. The Hibbertopteridae and Mycteropidae are united by the possession of a hastate telson with paired ventral keels and a cuticular ornament consisting of scales or mucrones.

It is thought that several genera within the Mycteropoidea may represent different ontogenic stages. Though further work is required to either confirm or disprove such hypotheses, one example is the suggestion that almost all the members of the Mycteroptidae (Megarachne, Mycterops and Woodwardopterus) might represent ontogenic stages of a single genus, Mycterops.

Superfamily Mycteropoidea Cope, 1886

- Family Drepanopteridae Kjellesvig-Waering, 1966
  - Drepanopterus Laurie, 1892
- Family Hibbertopteridae Kjellesvig-Waering, 1959
  - Campylocephalus Eichwald, 1860
  - ?Cyrtoctenus Størmer & Waterston, 1968 (=Hibbertopterus?)
  - ?Dunsopterus Waterston, 1968 (=Hibbertopterus?)
  - ?Glyptoscorpius Peach, 1882 (=Hibbertopterus?)
  - Hibbertopterus Kjellesvig-Waering, 1959
  - ?Vernonopterus Waterston, 1968 (=Hibbertopterus?)
- Family Mycteroptidae Cope, 1886
  - Hastimima White, 1908
  - Megarachne Hünicken, 1980
  - Mycterops Cope, 1886
  - Woodwardopterus Kjellesvig-Waering, 1959
