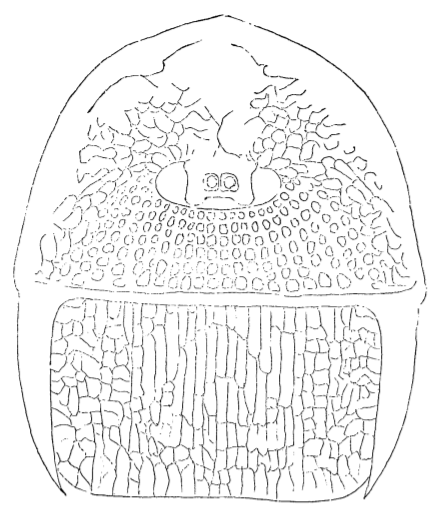
- Figure by Edward Drinker Cope of the carapace and part of the abdomen of M. ordinatus from its 1886 description

Scientific classification
- Kingdom: Animalia
- Phylum: Arthropoda
- Subphylum: Chelicerata
- Order: †Eurypterida
- Superfamily: †Mycteropoidea
- Family: †Mycteroptidae
- Genus: †Mycterops; Cope, 1886

Type species
- †Mycterops ordinatus Cope, 1886

Species
- †M. matthieui Pruvost, 1924; †M. ordinatus Cope, 1886

Synonyms
- Glaucodes Pruvost, 1923

= Mycterops =

Mycterops Temporal range: Upper Carboniferous

Extinct genus of sea scorpions

Mycterops is a genus of prehistoric eurypterid of the family Mycteroptidae. Mycterops lived during the Carboniferous period in Europe and North America.

== Description ==
Mycteroptids were medium-sized to fairly large. Their outer surface had numerous scales and reticulate ornamentation. Their first and possibly second tergites (dorsal surfaces of the abdominal sections) were strongly developed. Their legs resembled those of Stylonurus. The prosoma (head) was subtrapezoid, with small compound eyes.

== Classification ==
Three of the genera included in the Mycteroptidae - Mycterops, Woodwardopterus, and Megarachne - might represent different ontogenetic stages of each other based on the sizes of the referred specimens and the patterns of mucronation. This would sink the genera Woodwardopterus and Megarachne into Mycterops.

Mycterops whitei is a fragmentary species that might not be referrable to the genus at all if more complete specimens show that it has a caudal postabdomen.

=== Species ===
The species currently seen as valid species of the genus are:

- Mycterops matthieui Pruvost, 1924 — Carboniferous, Belgium.
- Mycterops ordinatus Cope, 1886 — Carboniferous, Pennsylvania (United States).

Invalid/reassigned species:

- "Mycterops" blairi Waterston, 1968 — Carboniferous, Scotland, assigned to Glyptoscorpius (=Hibbertopterus?).
- "Mycterops" whitei Schram, 1984 — Carboniferous, Iowa (United States), not congeneric with M. ordinatus, perhaps a crustacean and not a eurypterid.

== See also ==
- List of eurypterids
