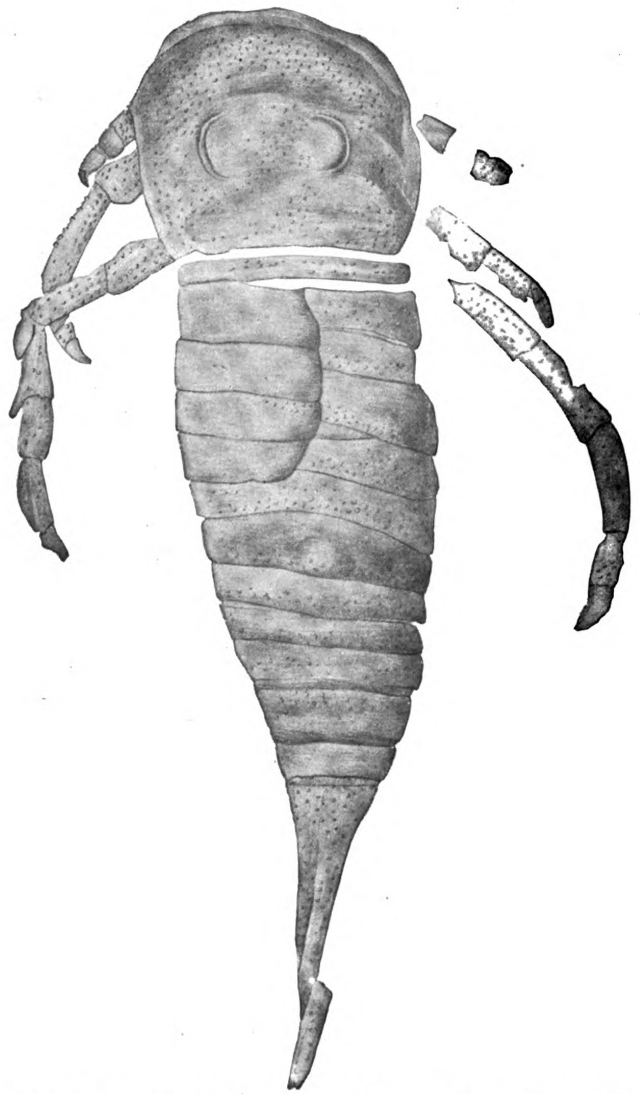
- Drepanopterus pentlandicus fossil
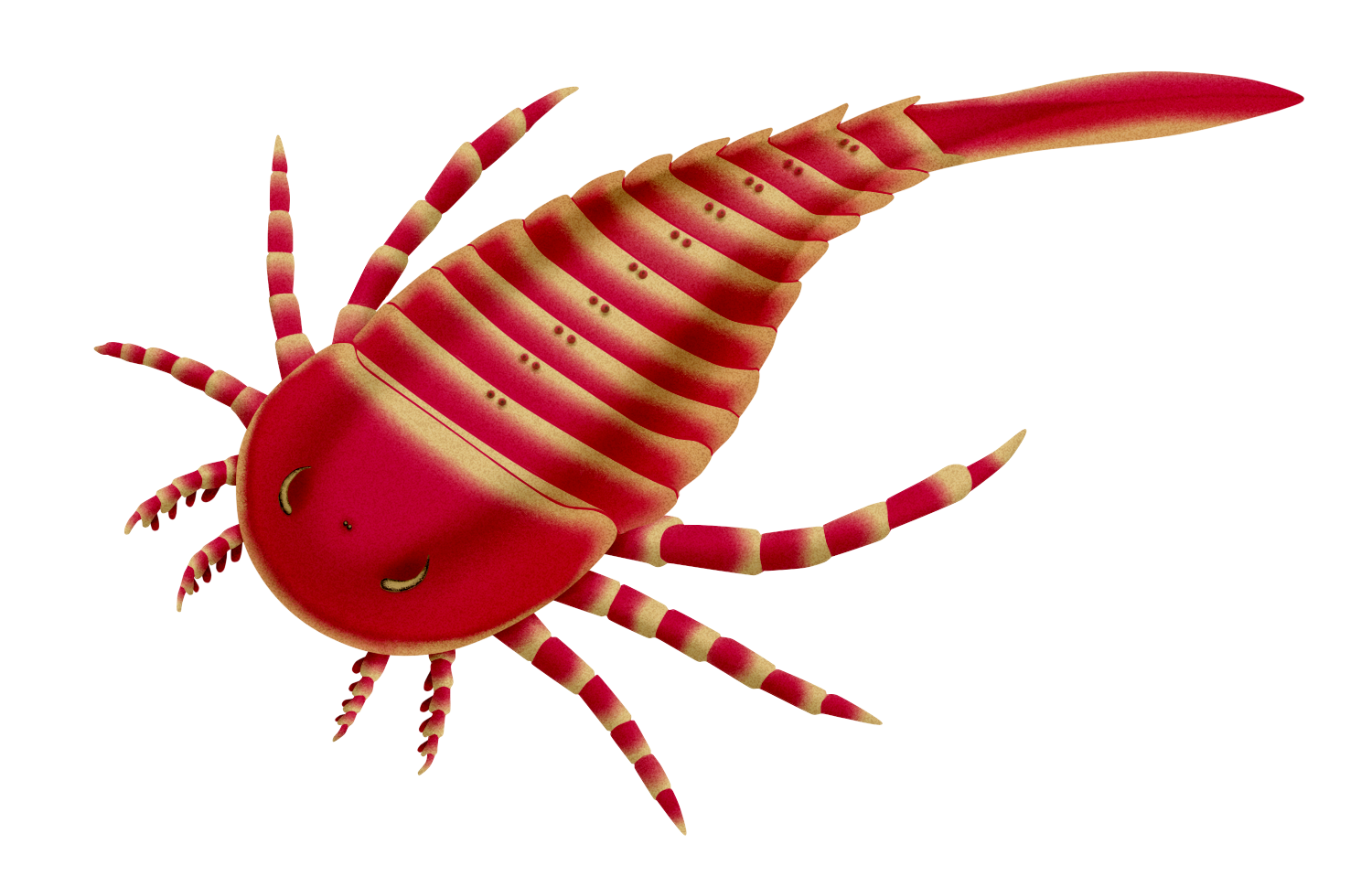
- Life restoration of D. pentlandicus

Scientific classification
- Kingdom: Animalia
- Phylum: Arthropoda
- Subphylum: Chelicerata
- Order: †Eurypterida
- Suborder: †Stylonurina
- Superfamily: †Mycteropoidea
- Family: †Drepanopteridae; Kjellesvig-Waering, 1966
- Genus: †Drepanopterus; Laurie, 1892

Species
- D. abonensis Simpson, 1951; D. odontospathus Lamsdell, 2012; D. pentlandicus Laurie, 1892 (type)

= Drepanopterus =

Drepanopterus Temporal range: Early Silurian - Late Devonian, 442–358.9 Ma

Extinct genus of sea scorpions

Drepanopterus is an extinct genus of eurypterid and the only member of the family Drepanopteridae within the Mycteropoidea superfamily. There are currently three species assigned to the genus. The genus has historically included more species, with nine species having been associated with the genus Drepanopterus. Five of these have since been proven to be synonyms of pre-existing species, assigned to their own genera, or found to be based on insubstantial fossil data. The holotype of one species proved to be a lithic clast.

Drepanopterus pentlandicus was first described from the Silurian strata of the Pentland Hills in Scotland. The only other fully described valid species is Drepanopterus abonensis, from the Upper Devonian of Portishead, Somerset. The exact relationship of Drepanopterus to other eurypterids has long been unclear; however, it is now apparent that it is a primitive mycteropoid, and an early relative of the Carboniferous Hibbertopterus.

== Description ==
Size comparison of the three species of Drepanopterus.

Drepanopterus is distinguished by its "fairly large" size, compound eyes with parallel axes on a subrectangular to subovate prosoma (head). All of its legs are walking legs; the first three pairs are short and powerful, with spines; the last two pairs are moderately long, ending in strongly curved terminal claw. The last leg reaches as far as the penultimate abdominal segment. The telson ranges from styliform to clavate. Drepanopterus date from the Silurian to the Upper Devonian periods.

Whilst classified as the basalmost member of the Drepanopteridae, Drepanopterus also shares certain characteristics with the kokomopteroids (such as having a clavate telson). Drepanopterus also has certain characteristics otherwise only found within the Mycteroptidae; appendage IV was not used in food capture and the coxae are large, as in Megarachne. Appendage III also retains some Hughmilleria-type conical spines suggesting that Drepanopterus hunted larger invertebrate or vertebrate prey than its later relatives.

== Species ==
Drepanopterus contains three valid species, with several others that historically have been assigned to it being recovered as outside of the genus. The species currently seen as valid species of the genus are:

- Drepanopterus abonensis Simpson, 1951 — Devonian, England.
- Drepanopterus odontospathus Lamsdell, 2012 — Devonian, Canada.
- Drepanopterus pentlandicus Laurie, 1892 — Silurian, Scotland.

Invalid or reassigned species are listed below:

- "Drepanopterus" bembycoides Laurie, 1899 — Silurian, Scotland. A basal member of the suborder Eurypterina. Potential synonym of Nanahughmilleria conica.
- "Drepanopterus" lobatus Laurie, 1899 — Silurian, Scotland. Later recognised as a sexual dimorph of "D". bembycoides, as it is identical except for the lobate epimera.
- "Drepanopterus" longicaudatus Clarke and Ruedemann, 1912 — Silurian, United States. Synonym of Kokomopterus.
- "Drepanopterus" nodosus Kjellesvig-Waering and Leutze, 1966 — Silurian, United States. Undiagnostic holotype and paratype, a basal member of the suborder Eurypterina.
- "Drepanopterus" ruedemanni O’Connell, 1916 — Ordovician, United States. A lithic clast.
- "Drepanopterus" struvei O’Connell, 1916 — Ordovician, United States. Synonym of Vinetopterus.

== See also ==
- List of eurypterids
