= Woodwardopterus =

Woodwardopterus Temporal range: Early Carboniferous ?350 Ma Possible Changhsingian record

Scientific classification
- Kingdom: Animalia
- Phylum: Arthropoda
- Subphylum: Chelicerata
- Order: †Eurypterida
- Superfamily: †Mycteropoidea
- Family: †Mycteroptidae
- Genus: †Woodwardopterus; Kjellesvig-Waering, 1959

Type species
- †Eurypterus scabrosus Woodward, 1887

Other species
- †?W. freemanorum Poschmann & Rozefelds, 2022

Extinct genus of arthropods

Woodwardopterus is a genus of prehistoric eurypterids, colloquially known as sea scorpions, classified as part of the family Mycteroptidae. The genus contains two named species, W. scabrosus from the Early Carboniferous of Scotland and possibly W. freemanorum from the Late Permian of Australia, the latter of which may instead represent a true scorpion rather than a late-surviving eurypterid.

== Discovery and naming ==
The type species, W. scabrosus, is known from the Carboniferous of Glencartholm, Scotland. Originally described as Eurypterus scabrosus, it was later found to be generically distinct and placed as a member of the family Mycteroptidae. Later in 2005, was assigned to its own genus, and linked to a new own family, Woodwardopteridae inside Mycteropoidea, probably as a sister taxon of Megarachne. W. scarabrosus had carapace length about 15 cm (5.9 in) and estimated total length about 45 cm (18 in).

A possible second species, W. freemanorum, from the Changhsingian (Late Permian) beds of the Baralaba Coal Measures, Bowen Basin, central Queensland, Australia was named in 2022 by the German paleontologist Markus Poschmann of the Generaldirektion Kulturelles Erbe RLP, and Andrew Rozefelds of the Queensland Museum. It was named after Nick Freeman, who discovered the large but incomplete fragment of the creature's cuticle about 12 cm (4.7 in) long on his family property near Theodore in central Queensland in the 1990s. Rozefelds and Poschmann (2022) suggested that the species represents the geologically youngest known eurypterid, possibly extending the known occurrence of eurypterids until the end-Permian extinction in the southern high latitudes of Gondwana. It was probably a large sweep-feeder commonly considered as mycteroptid ecology, estimated to have a length of greater than 1 m (3 ft 3 in). In 2025, James C. Lamsdell suggested that W. freemanorum may instead represent a true scorpion rather than a late-surviving eurypterid based on the ornaments of tubercles with irregularly aligned pustules.

== See also ==
- List of eurypterids
