= Gardineria =

Gardineria may refer to:

- Gardineria (coral), a genus of corals in the family Gardineriidae
- Gardineria, a fossil genus of fishes in the family Karaunguriidae, synonym of Gardinerpiscis
- Gardineria, a genus of crustaceans in the family Pseudoziidae, synonym of Euryozius
