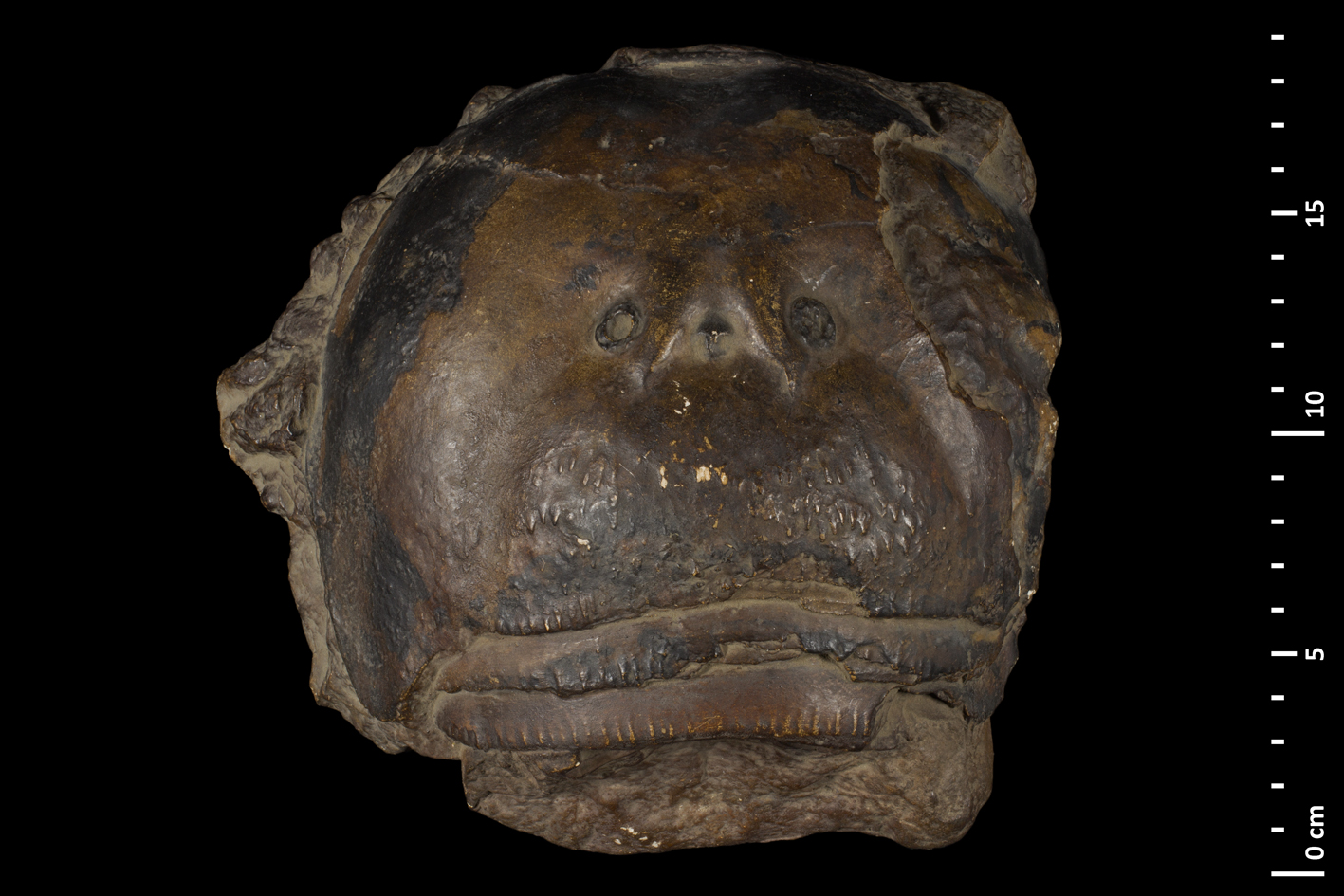
- Fossil carapace of H. scouleri
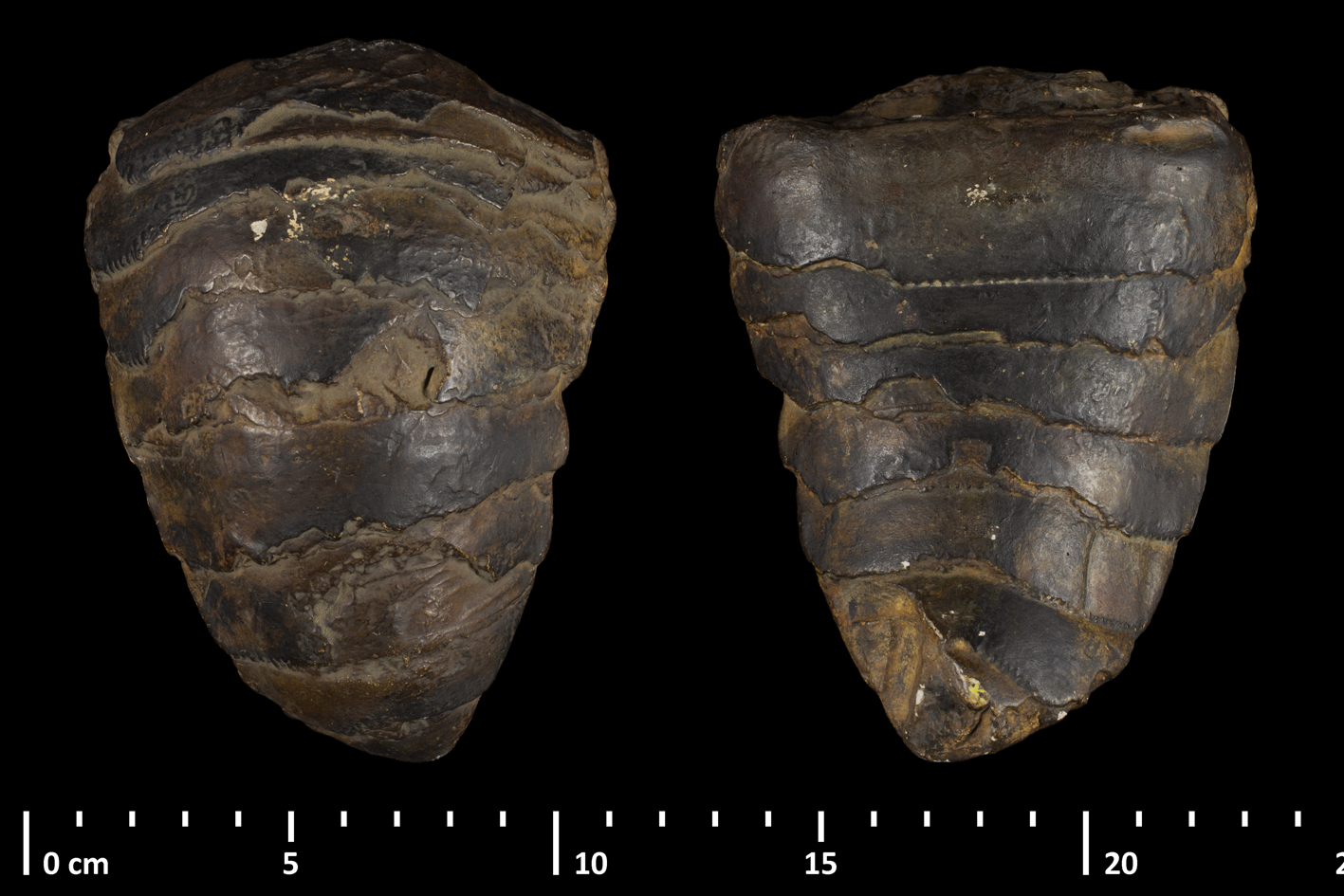
- Fossil tergites of H. scouleri

Scientific classification
- Kingdom: Animalia
- Phylum: Arthropoda
- Subphylum: Chelicerata
- Order: †Eurypterida
- Superfamily: †Mycteropoidea
- Family: †Hibbertopteridae
- Genus: †Hibbertopterus; Kjellesvig-Waering, 1959

Type species
- †Eurypterus scouleri Hibbert, 1836

Species
- †?H. hibernicus (Baily, 1872); †H. scouleri (Hibbert, 1836); †H. lamsdelli (Braddy, 2023); Also called Cyrtoctenus: †H. caledonicus (Salter, 1863); †H. dewalquei (Fraipont, 1889); †H. dicki (Peach, 1883); †H. ostraviensis (Augusta & Přibyl, 1951); †H. peachi (Størmer & Waterston, 1968); †H. wittebergensis (Waterston, Oelofsen & Oosthuizen, 1985); †?H. wrightianus (Dawson, 1881); Also called Dunsopterus: †H. stevensoni (Etheridge Jr, 1877)

Synonyms
- Cyrtoctenus? Størmer & Waterston, 1968; Dunsopterus? Waterston, 1968; Glyptoscorpius? Peach, 1882; Vernonopterus? Peach, 1905

= Hibbertopterus =

Hibbertopterus Temporal range: Middle Devonian to Pennsylvanian (Givetian to Kasimovian), 387.7–303.7 Ma

Extinct genus of arthropods

Hibbertopterus is a genus of eurypterid, a group of extinct marine arthropods. Fossils of Hibbertopterus have been discovered in deposits ranging from the Devonian period in Belgium, Scotland and the United States to the Carboniferous period in Scotland, Ireland, the Czech Republic and South Africa. The type species, H. scouleri, was first named as a species of the significantly different Eurypterus by Samuel Hibbert in 1836. The generic name Hibbertopterus, coined more than a century later, combines his name and the Greek word πτερόν (pteron) meaning "wing".

Hibbertopterus was the largest eurypterid within the stylonurine suborder, with the largest fossil specimens suggesting that H. scouleri could reach lengths around 180–200 centimetres (5.9–6.6 ft). Though this is significantly smaller than the largest eurypterid overall, Jaekelopterus, which could reach lengths of around 250 centimetres (8.2 ft), Hibbertopterus is likely to have been the heaviest due to its broad and compact body. Furthermore, trackway evidence indicates that the South African species H. wittebergensis might have reached lengths similar to Jaekelopterus.

Like many other stylonurine eurypterids, Hibbertopterus fed through a method called sweep-feeding. It used its specialised forward-facing appendages (limbs), equipped with several spines, to rake through the substrate of the environments in which it lived in search for small invertebrates to eat, which it could then push towards its mouth. Though long hypothesised, the fact that eurypterids were capable of terrestrial locomotion was definitely proven through the discovery of a fossil trackway made by Hibbertopterus in Scotland. The trackway showed that an animal measuring around 160 centimetres (5.2 ft) had slowly lumbered across a stretch of land, dragging its telson (the posteriormost division of its body) across the ground after it. How Hibbertopterus could survive on land, however briefly, is unknown but it might have been possible through either its gills being able to function in air as long as they were wet or by the animal possessing a dual respiratory system, theorised to have been present in at least some eurypterids.

Though sometimes, and often historically, treated as distinct genera, the hibbertopterid eurypterids Cyrtoctenus and Dunsopterus have been suggested to represent adult ontogenetic stages of Hibbertopterus. The features of fossils associated with these genera suggest that the sweep-feeding strategy of Hibbertopterus changed significantly over the course of its life, from simpler raking organs present in younger specimens to specialised comb-like organs capable of trapping prey (rather than simply pushing it towards the mouth) in adults.

== Description ==
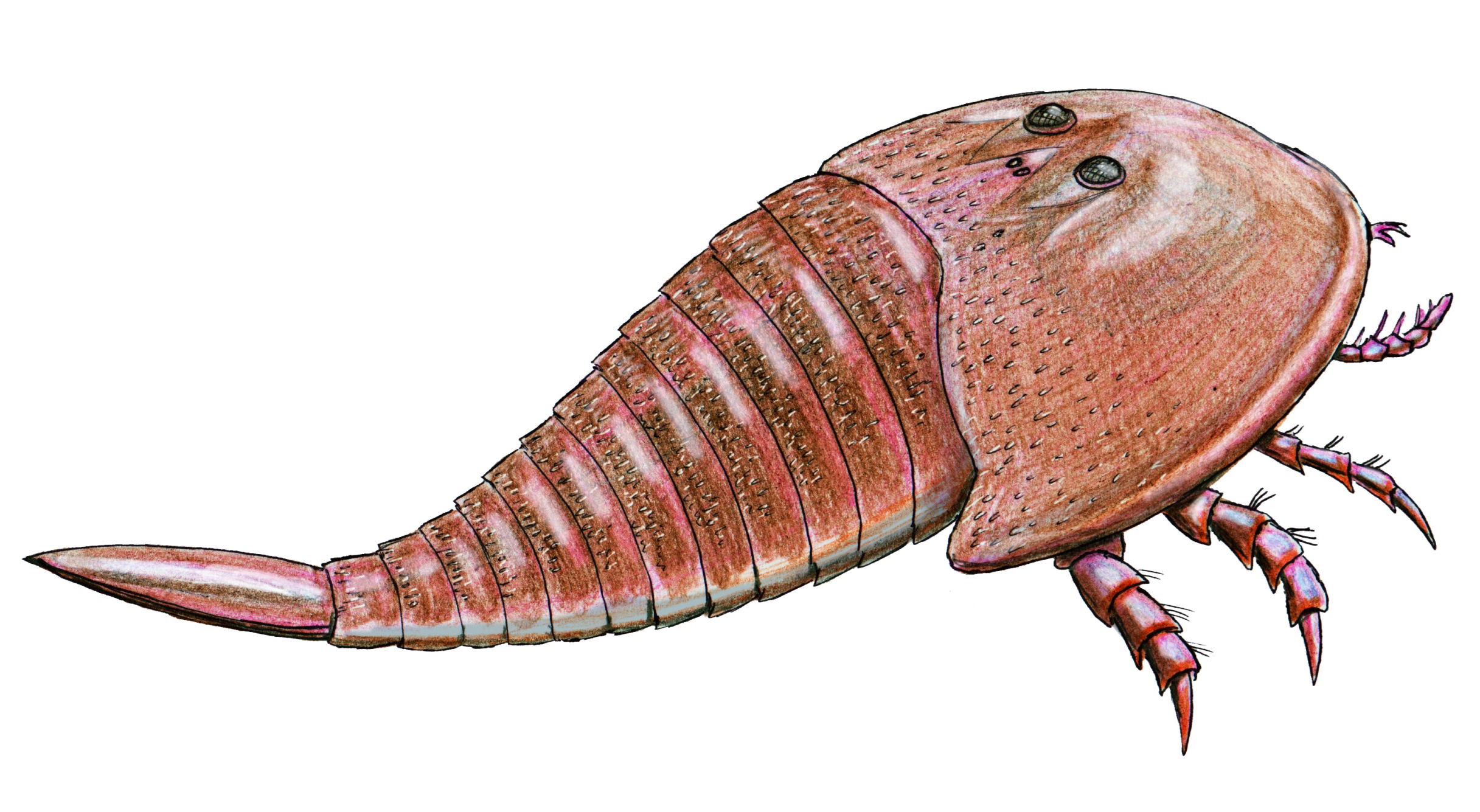
Restoration of H. scouleri

Like other known hibbertopterid eurypterids, Hibbertopterus was a large, broad-bodied and heavy animal. It was the largest known eurypterid of the suborder Stylonurina, composed of those eurypterids that lacked swimming paddles. A carapace (the part of the exoskeleton which covered the head) referred to the species H. scouleri, from Carboniferous Scotland, measures 65 centimetres (26 in) wide. Since Hibbertopterus was unusually wide relative to its length for a eurypterid, the animal in question would probably have measured around 180–200 centimetres (5.9–6.6 ft) in length. Even though there were eurypterids of greater length (such as Jaekelopterus and Carcinosoma), Hibbertopterus was very deep-bodied and compact in comparison to other eurypterids and the mass of the specimen in question would likely have rivalled that of other giant eurypterids (and other giant arthropods), if not surpassed them. In addition to fossil finds of large specimens, fossil trackways attributed to the species H. wittebergensis from South Africa indicates an animal around 250 centimetres (8.2 ft) in length (the same size attributed to the largest known eurypterid, Jaekelopterus), though the largest known fossil specimens of the species only appear to have reached lengths of 135 centimetres (4.43 ft).

The size of H. scouleri, compared to a human

The forward-facing appendages (limbs) of Hibbertopterus (pairs 2, 3 and 4) were specialised for gathering food. The distal podomeres (leg segments) of these three pairs of limbs were covered with long spines, and the end of each limb was covered with sensory organs. These adaptations suggest that Hibbertopterus, like other hibbertopterids, would have fed by a method referred to as sweep-feeding, using its limbs to sweep through the substrate of its environment in search for food. The fourth pair of appendages, though used in feeding like the second and third pairs, was also used for locomotion and the two final pairs of legs (pairs five and six overall) were solely locomotory. As such, Hibbertopterus would have used a hexapodal (six-legged) gait.

Although not enough fossil material is known of the other hibbertopterid eurypterids to discuss the differences between them with full confidence, Hibbertopterus is defined based on a collection of definite characteristics. The telson (the posteriormost division of the body) was hastate (e.g. shaped like a gladius, a Roman sword) and had a keel running down the middle, with in turn had a small indentation in its own centre. The walking legs of Hibbertopterus had extensions at their base and lacked longitudinal posterior grooves in all of its podomeres (leg segments). Some of these characteristics, in particular the shape of the telson, are thought to have been shared by other hibbertopterids, which are much less well preserved than Hibbertopterus itself.

=== Table of species ===
The status of the 10 species listed below follow a 2018 survey by German paleontologists Jason A. Dunlop and Denise Jekel and British paleontologist David Penney and size- and temporal ranges follow a 2009 study by American paleontologists James Lamsdell and Simon J. Braddy unless otherwise noted. The distinguishing features of H. caledonicus, H. dewalquei, H. ostraviensis and H. peachi follow the 1968 description of these species. The descriptors, Norwegian paleontologist Leif Størmer and British paleontologist Charles D. Waterston, did not consider these species to represent eurypterids, though any emended diagnosis of them is yet to be published.

Species	Author	Year	Status	Length	Temporal range	Notes & description
Hibbertopterus caledonicus	Salter	1863	Valid	?	Viséan (Carboniferous)	Fossil isolated rachis found in Scotland. H. caledonicus is distinguished by the long filaments (longer than those of H. peachi) of its second pair of appendages and the presence of small cone-shaped fulcra (supportive tissue) along the limbs.
Hibbertopterus dewalquei	Fraipont	1889	Valid	?	Famennian (Devonian)	Fossil isolated rachis found in Belgium. The distinguishing feature of H. dewalquei is the presence of ~110 filaments in every row of its comb-like feeding organs.
Hibbertopterus dicki	Peach	1883	Valid	?	Givetian (Devonian)	Fossil isolated tergites found in Scotland. The fossil material of H. dicki is too limited to confidently establish any distinguishing features, though it can be confidently be assigned to the genus based on its "striking similarities" to the other species.
Hibbertopterus hibernicus	Baily	1872	Uncertain	?	Tournaisian (Carboniferous)	The only known specimen, discovered in Ireland, is probably lost and was originally assigned to Pterygotus. It was referred to Hibbertopterus in 1964 with no specification as to why.
Hibbertopterus lamsdelli	Braddy et al.	2023	Valid		Late Carboniferous	Tail spine, ventral keels, and trackways
Hibbertopterus ostraviensis	Augusta & Přibyl	1951	Valid	?	Bashkirian (Carboniferous)	Fossil isolated rachis found in the Czech Republic. The fossil material of H. ostraviensis is too limited to confidently establish any distinguishing features.
Hibbertopterus peachi	Størmer & Waterston	1968	Valid	?	Tournaisian - Viséan (Carboniferous)	Fossil isolated rachis found in Scotland. The distinguishing features of H. peachi are the large number filaments on its first pair of appendages and the longer filaments on the second pair of appendages, which also have large fulcra.
Hibbertopterus scouleri	Hibbert	1836	Valid	180 cm	Viséan (Carboniferous)	Size estimate is based on a complete carapace. As the type species, no particular distinguishing features are established for H. scouleri. Its latest published diagnosis is simply the same as the diagnosis of the genus itself.
Hibbertopterus stevensoni	Etheridge, Jr.	1877	Valid	80 cm	Viséan (Carboniferous)	Fragmentary fossils known from Scotland. Known primarily from leg segments, the primary distinguishing feature of H. stevesoni is the precise arrangement of lunules (crescent-shaped markings) on said leg segments, forming rows. This is different from, for an example, H. peachi, in which these lunules are more in number and not as well sorted into rows.
Hibbertopterus wittebergensis	Waterston, Oelofsen & Oosthuizen	1985	Valid	135 cm (250 cm)	Tournaisian (Carboniferous)	The lower size estimate follows known fossil evidence. The higher size estimate derives from trackway evidence. H. wittebergensis can be distinguished from other species by the oval shape of its ocellar node (the raised portion of the carapace on which the ocelli are located) and by the many crenulations present on the distal margins of its leg segments.
Hibbertopterus wrightianus	Dawson	1881	Uncertain	120 cm	Famennian (Devonian)	Isolated podomeres of a prosomal appendage have been discovered in the United States. The fossil material of H. wrightianus is too limited to confidently establish any distinguishing features, but it is noted to be similar to H. stevensoni.

== History of research ==
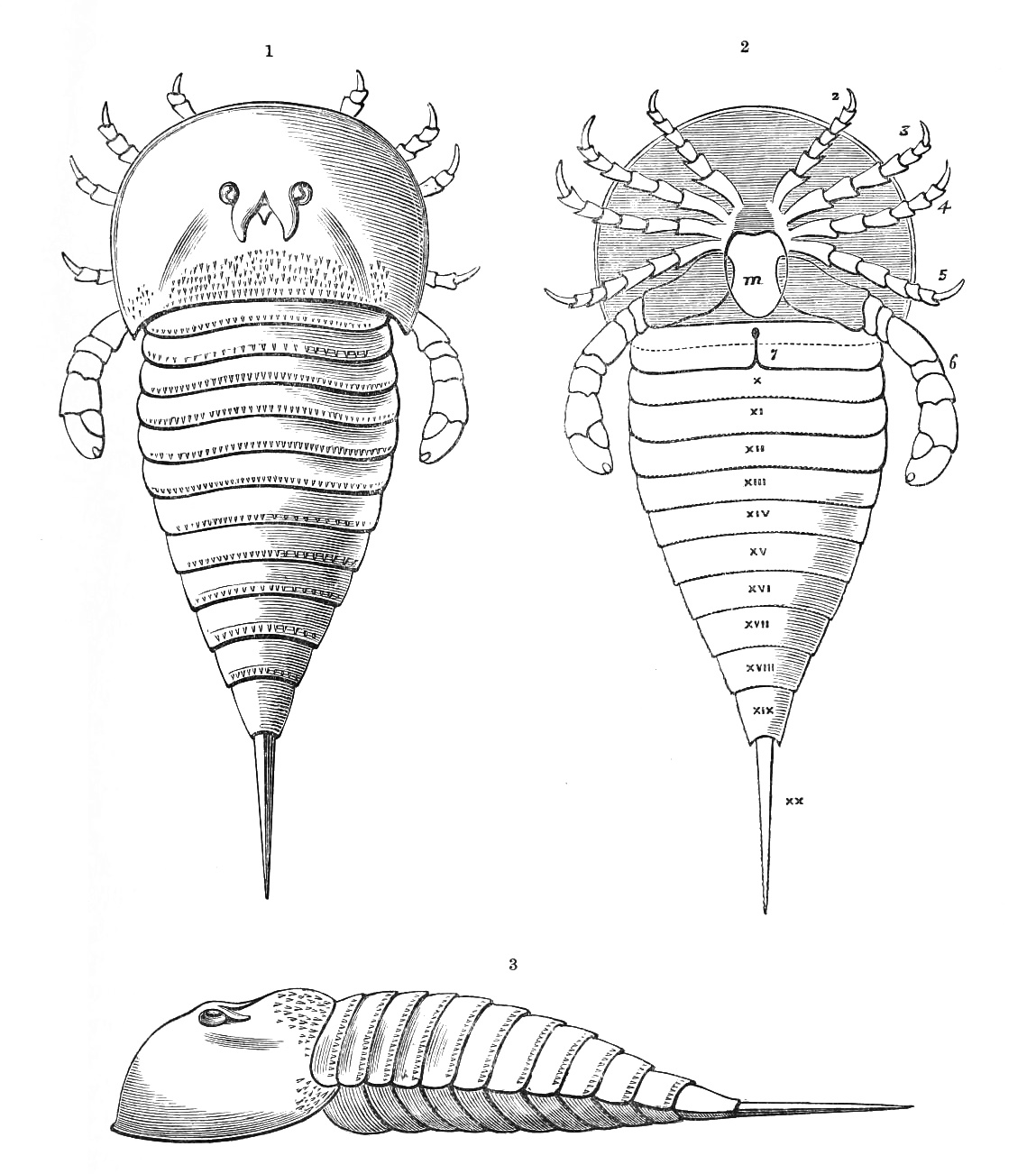
Outdated 1872 reconstruction by Henry Woodward of H. scouleri with a telson and appendages based on those of Eurypterus (with swimming paddles and unspecialised walking appendages).

In 1831, Scottish naturalist John Scouler described the remains, consisting of a massive and unusual prosoma (head) and several tergites (segments from the back of the animal), of a large and strange arthropod discovered in deposits in Scotland of Lower Carboniferous age, but did not assign a name to the fossils. Through Scouler's examination, the fossils represent the second eurypterid to be scientifically studied, just six years after the 1825 description of Eurypterus itself. Five years later, in 1836, British geologist Samuel Hibbert redescribed the same fossil specimens, giving them the name Eurypterus scouleri.

The eurypterid genus Glyptoscorpius was named by British geologist Ben Peach, who also named the species G. perornatus (treated as the type species of Glyptoscorpius by later researchers although it had not originally been designated as such) in 1882. The genus was based on G. perornatus and the fragmentary species G. caledonicus, previously described as the plant Cycadites caledonicus by English paleontologist John William Salter in 1863. This designation was reinforced with more fossil fragments discovered in the Coomsdon Burn, which Peach referred to Glyptoscorpius caledonicus. In 1887 Peach described G. minutisculptus from Mount Vernon, Glasgow, and G. kidstoni from Radstock in Somerset. Peach's Glyptoscorpius is highly problematic; some of the diagnostic characteristics used when describing it are either questionable or outright meaningless. For instance, the original description had been based on G. caledonicus and G. perornatus but since the parts of the body preserved in the fossils described don't completely overlap it is impossible to say if Peach's diagnostic characteristics actually apply to the two original species.

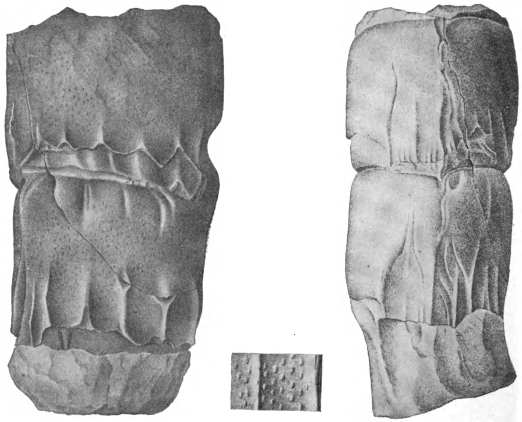
The two fossil fragments referred to Cyrtoctenus wrightianus

Though only represented by two small, jointed and vaguely cylindrical fossil fragments (both discovered in the Portage sandstones of Italy, New York), the species today recognised as H. wrightianus has had a complicated taxonomic history. Originally described in 1881 as a species of plant, the fragmentary fossil referred to as "Equisetides wrightiana" was noted to represent the fossil remains of a eurypterid by American paleontologist James Hall in 1884, three years later. Though Hall assigned the species to Stylonurus, that same year British paleontologists Henry Woodward and Thomas Rupert Jones assigned the fossil to the genus Echinocaris, believing the fossils represented a phyllocarid crustacean. The assignment to Echinocaris was probably based on the slightly spinose surface of the fossils, but in 1888 Hall and American paleontologist John Mason Clarke pointed out that no described Echinocaris actually had spines similar to what Woodward and Jones suggested and as such, reassigned the species back to Stylonurus, interpreting the fossils as fragments of the long walking legs. An assignment to Stylonurus was affirmed by Clarke and American paleontologist Rudolf Ruedemann in their influential The Eurypterida of New York in 1912, though no distinguishing features of the fossils were given due to their fragmentary nature.

Inexplicably, Pterygotus hibernicus (a species described by British paleontologist William Hellier Baily in 1872) was reassigned to Hibbertopterus by American paleontologist Erik N. Kjellesvig-Waering in 1964 as part of a greater, but apparently flawed re-examination of the various species assigned to the family Pterygotidae. Kjellesvig-Waering retained P. dicki as part of Pterygotus. Scottish paleontologists Lyall I. Anderson and Nigel H. Trewin and German paleontologist Jason A. Dunlop noted in 2000 that Kjellesvig-Waering's acceptance of the original designation for Pterygotus dicki was "burdensome" as it is based on highly fragmentary material. They noted that like many other pterygotid species, P. dicki represented yet another name applied to some scattered segments, a practice they deemed "taxonomically unsound". Though they suggested that further research was required to determine whether or not the taxon was valid at all, they did note that the presence of a fringe to the segments formed by their ornamentation was absent in all other species of Pterygotus, but "strikingly similar" to what was present in Cyrtoctenus. Subsequent research treated P. dicki as a species of Cyrtoctenus.

When Kjellesvig-Waering designated the genus Hibbertopterus in 1959, Eurypterus scouleri had already been referred to (considered a species of) the related Campylocephalus for some time. Kjellesvig-Waering recognised Campylocephalus scouleri as distinct from the type species of that genus, C. oculatus, in that the prosoma of Campylocephalus was more narrow, had a subelliptical (almost elliptical) shape and had its widest point in the middle rather than at the base. Further differences were noted in the position and shape of the animal's compound eyes, which in Hibbertopterus are surrounded by a ring-like shape of hardened integument (absent in Campylocephalus). The eyes of Hibbertopterus are also located near the center of the head whereas those of Campylocephalus are located further back. The generic name Hibbertopterus was selected to honor the original descriptor of H. scouleri, Samuel Hibbert.

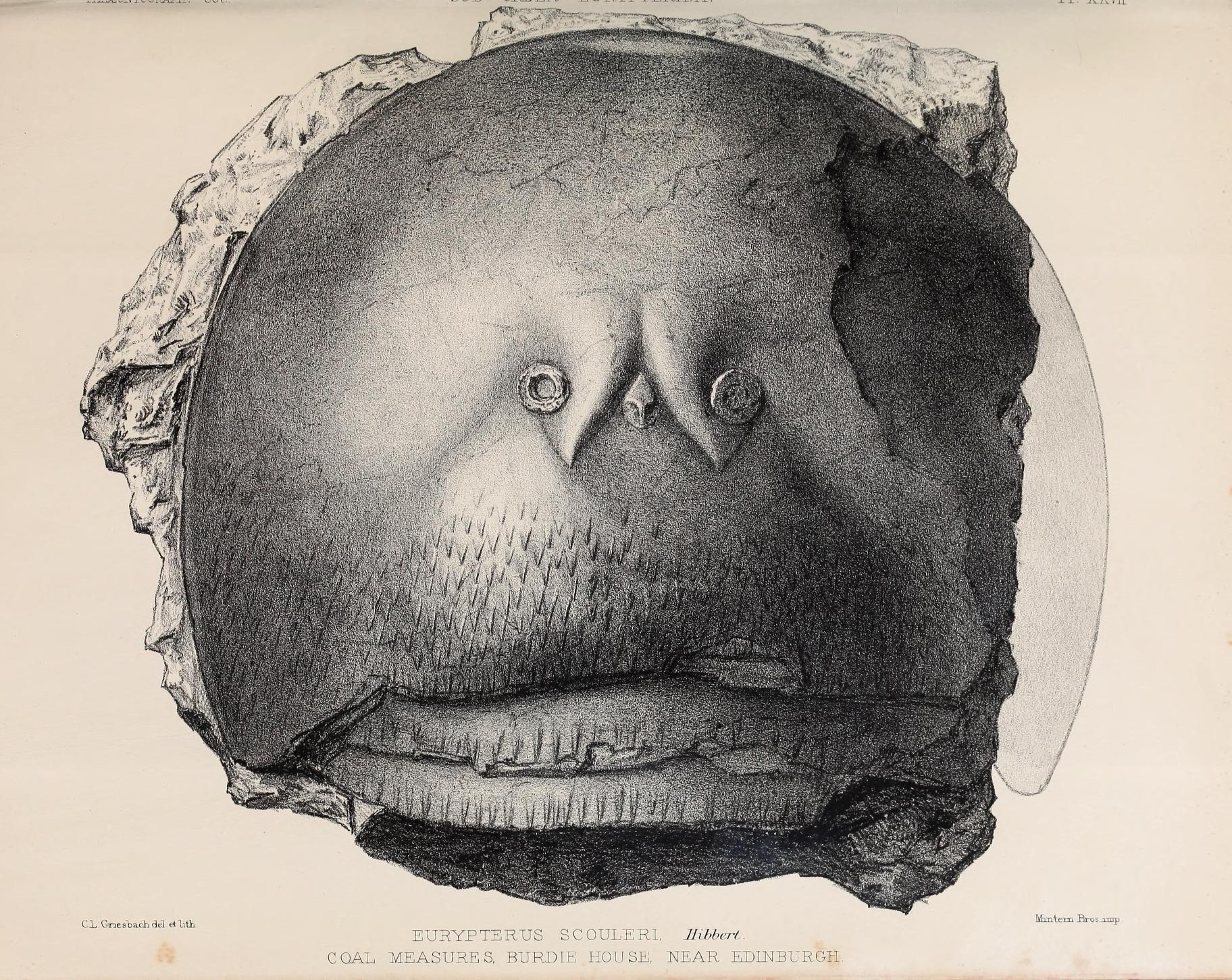
Drawing of the carapace of H. scouleri by Henry Woodward

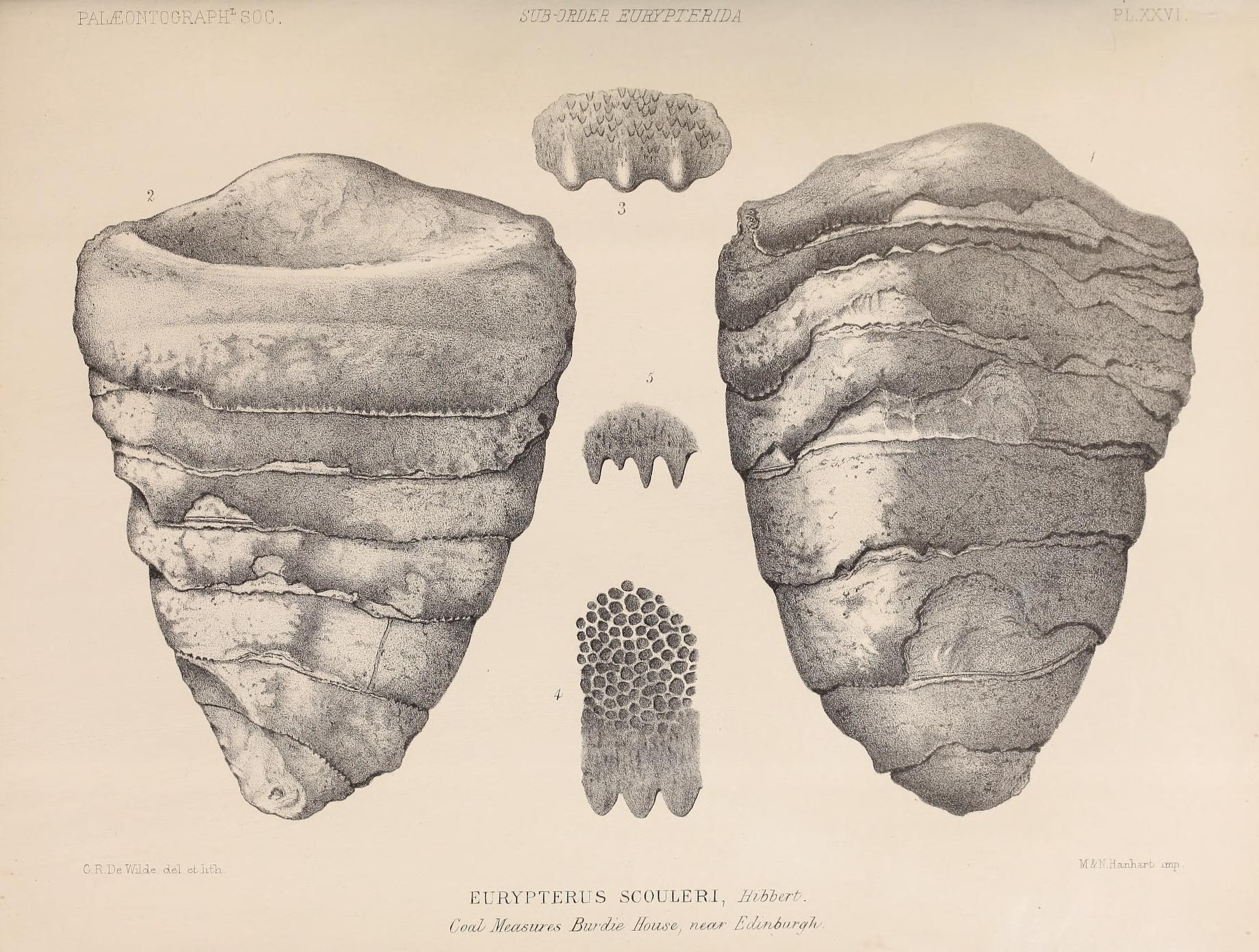
Fossil tergites of H. scouleri, drawn by Woodward

The fact that Glyptoscorpius was questionable at best and that its type species, G. perornatus, (and other species, such as G. kidstoni) had recently been referred to the genus Adelophthalmus prompted Norwegian paleontologist Leif Størmer and British paleontologist Charles D. Waterston to in 1968 re-examine the various species that had been referred to it. Because G. perornatus was the type species of Glyptoscorpius, the genus itself became synonymous with Adelophthalmus. That same year, the species G. minutisculptus had been designated the type species of a distinct eurypterid genus, Vernonopterus. Størmer and Waterston concluded that the Glyptoscorpius species G. caledonicus was to be part of a new genus, which they named Cyrtoctenus (the name deriving from the Greek Cyrtoctenos, a curved comb) and they named a new species, C. peachi (named in honour of Ben Peach), as its type. Both of these species were based on fragmentary fossil remains. Furthermore, the species G. stevensoni, named in 1936, was referred to the new genus Dunsopterus. The key diagnostic feature of Cyrtoctenus was its comb-like first appendages. Waterston remarked in another 1968 paper that the "controversial" Stylonurus wrightianus was similar to the unusual and massive prosomal appendage of Dunsopterus and as such reassigned S. wrightianus to Dunsopterus, creating Dunsopterus wrightianus.

Other than C. peachi and C. caledonicus, further species were added to Cyrtoctenus by Størmer and Waterston; Eurypterus dewalquei, described in 1889, and Ctenopterus ostraviensis, described in 1951, became Cyrtoctenus dewalquei and C. ostraviensis, respectively. Despite noting the presence of eurypterid-type tergites, Størmer and Waterston thought that the Cyrtoctenus fossils represented remains of a new order of aquatic arthropods which they dubbed "Cyrtoctenida". The species C. dewalquei had originally been described as the fragmentary remains of a eurypterid in 1889 was assigned to Cyrtoctenus on the basis of the perceived filaments present on its appendages, similar to those of C. peachi. Størmer and Waterston disregarded specimens referred to C. caledonicus other than the unique fragmentary type specimen, which at this point had been plastically preserved in sandstone. Like C. caledonicus, C. ostraviensis was also known only from a single specimen, a fragment of an appendage described in 1951. No distinguishing features were given for the species, and the authors noted that it was possibly synonymous with C. peachi, but they chose to maintain it as distinct due to the very limited fossil material.

Known from a single specimen described in 1985, H. wittebergensis (described as Cyrtoctenus wittebergensis) is the only species of Hibbertopterus known from reasonably complete remains other than the type species itself. The fossil, discovered in the Waaipoort Formation near Klaarstroom, Cape Province, South Africa, is remarkably complete, preserving not only the prosoma, the telson and several tergites, but also coxae and even part of the digestive system. The discovery was also important for eurypterid research in general, since it represents one of the few eurypterids known from the southern hemisphere, where eurypterid finds are rare and usually fragmentary. The presence of the gut in the fossil proves that the specimen represents a dead individual, and not only exuviae, and scientists examining it could conclude that it had been preserved as lying on its back. The description of H. wittebergensis affirmed that the "cyrtoctenids" were definitely Hibbertopterus-type eurypterids, not representatives of a new order of arthropods.

== Classification ==
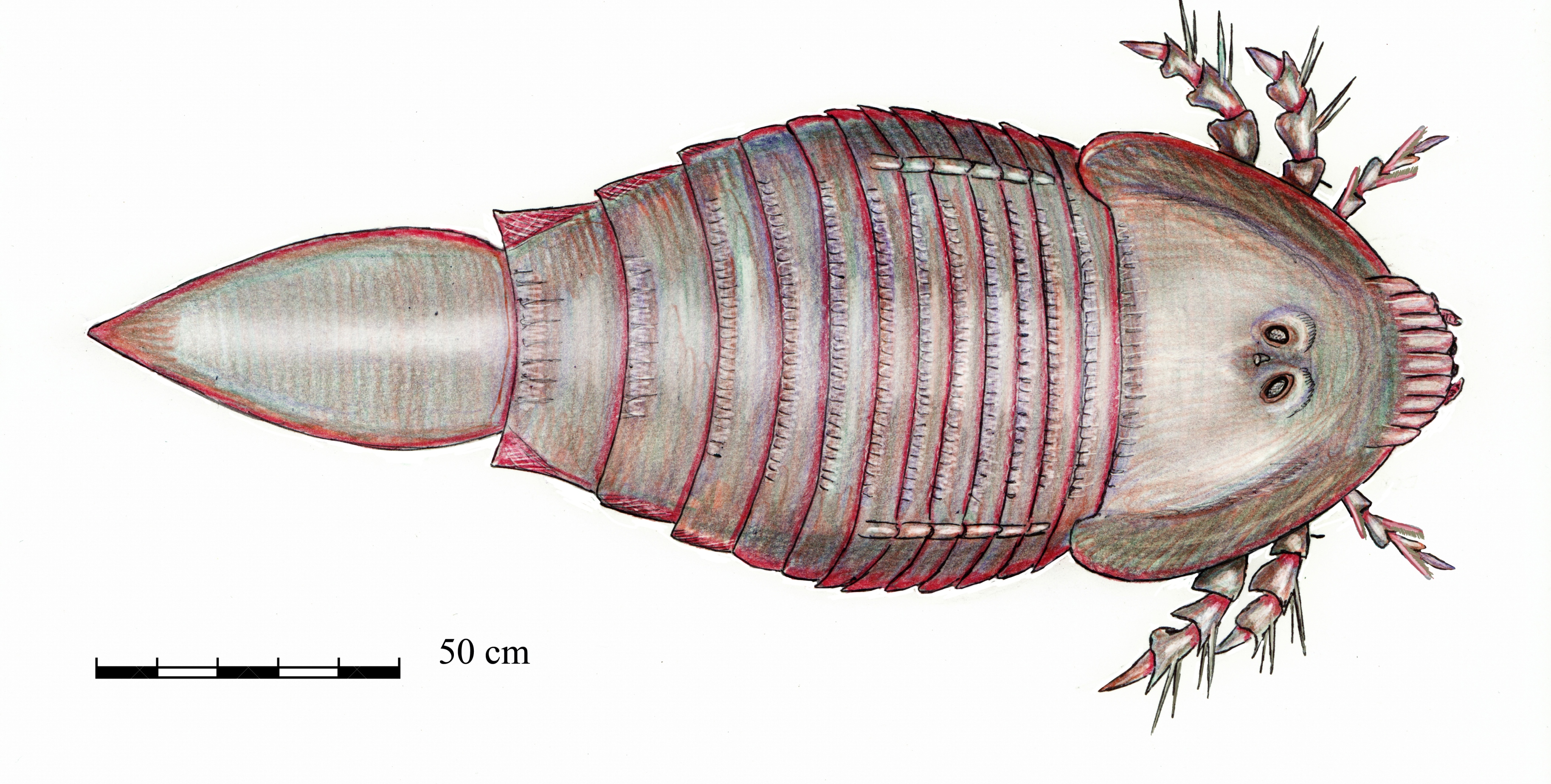
Restoration of Cyrtoctenus wittebergensis

Hibbertopterus is classified as part of the family Hibbertopteridae, which it also lends its name to, a family of eurypterids within the superfamily Mycteropoidea, alongside the genera Campylocephalus and Vernonopterus. The hibbertopterids are united as a group by being large mycteropoids with broad prosomas, a hastate telson similar to that of Hibbertopterus, ornamentation consisting of scales or other similar structures on the exoskeleton, the fourth pair of appendages possessing spines, the more posterior tergites of the abdomen possessing tongue-shaped scales near their edges and there being lobes positioned posterolaterally (posteriorly on both sides) on the prosoma. Historically, the morphology of Hibbertopterus and the other hibbertopterids has been seen as so unusual that they have been thought to be an order separate from Eurypterida.

The features of Campylocephalus and Vernonopterus makes it clear that both genera represent hibbertopterid eurypterids, but the incomplete nature of all fossil specimens referred to them make any further study of the precise phylogenetic relationships within the Hibbertopteridae difficult. Both genera could even represent synonyms of Hibbertopterus itself, though the highly incomplete nature of their remains again makes that hypothesis impossible to confirm.

The cladogram below is adapted from Lamsdell (2012), collapsed to only show the superfamily Mycteropoidea.

- Mycteropoidea
  - Drepanopteridae
    - Drepanopterus pentlandicus
    - - Drepanopterus abonensis
      - Drepanopterus odontospathus
  - - Mycteroptidae
      - Woodwardopterus scabrosus
      - - Mycterops mathieui
        - - Hastimima whitei
          - Megarachne servinei
    - Hibbertopteridae
      - Campylocephalus oculatus
      - - Hibbertopterus scouleri
        - Cyrtoctenus wittebergensis

=== Cyrtoctenus and Dunsopterus ===
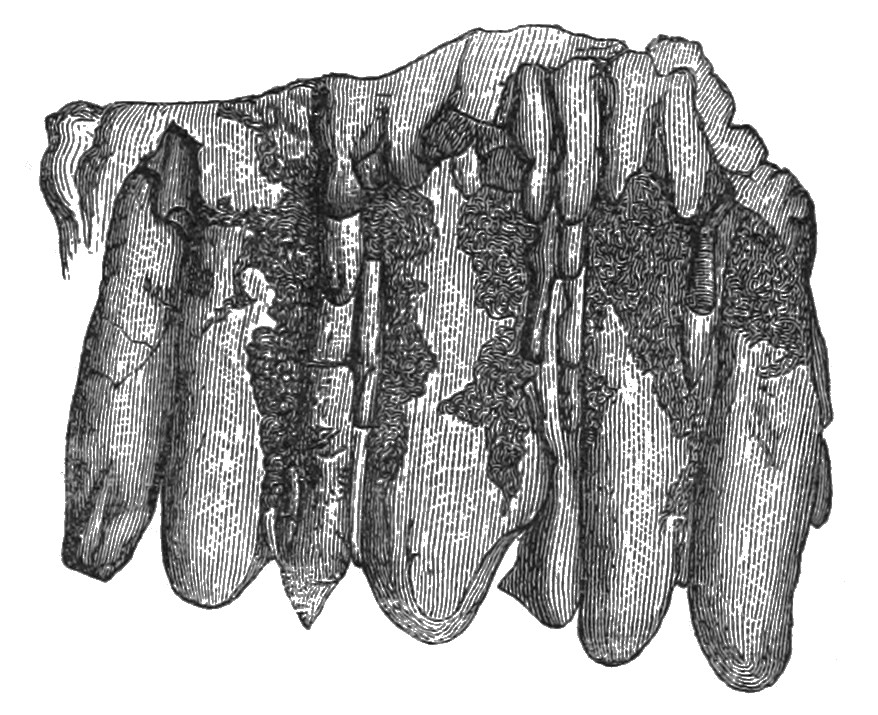
Fossil spines of Dunsopterus stevensoni

Many analyses and overviews treat the ten species assigned to Hibbertopterus as composing three separate, but closely related, hibbertopterid genera. In these arrangements, Hibbertopterus is typically restricted to the species H. scouleri and H. hibernicus, with the species H. stevensoni being the type and only species of the genus Dunsopterus and the species H. caledonicus, H. dewalquei, H. dicki, H. ostraviensis, H. peachi and H. wittebergensis being referred to the genus Cyrtoctenus (where H. peachi is the type species).

The idea that Dunsopterus and Cyrtoctenus were congeneric (e.g. synonymous) was first suggested by British geologist Charles D. Waterston in 1985. Dunsopterus is known from very fragmentary material, mainly sclerites (various hardened body parts) which have little diagnostic potential and are poorly known in fossils attributed to Cyrtoctenus. The morphology of fossils attributed to Dunsopterus and Cyrtoctenus does suggest that they were more specialised than H. scouleri, particularly in their adaptations to sweep-feeding. If valid, Cyrtoctenus would have had further adaptations towards sweep-feeding than any other hibbertopterid, with its blades modified into comb-like rachis that could entrap smaller prey or other organic food particles.

It was suggested as early as 1993 by American paleontologist Paul Selden and British paleontologist Andrew J. Jeram that these adaptations might not have been due to Dunsopterus and Cyrtoctenus representing more derived genera of hibbertopterids, but rather due to both genera perhaps representing adult forms of Hibbertopterus. In this case, the development of the more specialized sweep-feeding method of Cyrtoctenus can directly be explained by the larger size of the specimens referred to Cyrtoctenus. The method of Hibbertopterus, which involves raking, would have become significantly less effective the larger the animal grew since a larger and larger portion of its prey would be small enough to pass between its sweep-feeding spines. Any specimen over the size of a metre (3.2 ft) which continued to feed on small invertebrates would need modified sweep-feeding appendages or would need to employ a different feeding method altogether. As such, it is more than possible that later ontogenetic stages of Hibbertopterus developed the structures seen in Cyrtoctenus to be able to continue to feed at larger body sizes.

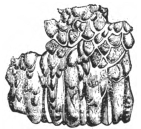
More fossil spines and fossil ornamentation referred to Dunsopterus stevensoni

Fossil specimens of Hibbertopterus frequently occur together with fragments referred to Cyrtoctenus, Dunsopterus and Vernonopterus. The three fragmentary genera were suggested to by synonyms of each other by American paleontologist James Lamsdell in 2010, which would have meant the oldest name, Dunsopterus, taking priority and subsuming both Cyrtoctenus and Vernonopterus as junior synonyms. Following studies on the ontogeny of Drepanopterus, a more primitid mycteropoid eurypterid, large-scale changes in the developments of the appendages over the course of the life of a single animal have been proven to have happened in some eurypterids. One of the key features distinguishing Cyrtoctenus from Hibbertopterus is the presence of grooves on its podomeres, which studies on Drepanopterus suggest might have been a feature which appeared late in an animal's life cycle. Differences in the positions of the eyes in specimens of Hibbertopterus and Cyrtoctenus is not surprising as movements of the eyes through ontogeny has been described in other eurypterid genera. Lamsdell considered it almost certain that Dunsopterus was a junior synonym of Hibbertopterus and that Cyrtoctenus and Vernonopterus in turn represented junior synonyms of Dunsopterus, which would subsume all three into Hibbertopterus. Synonymizing Hibbertopterus with Cyrtoctenus and Dunsopterus would also explain why smaller Hibbertopterus specimens are more complete than the known fossil remains of Cyrtoctenus, often fragmentary. The majority of Hibbertopterus specimens would then represent exuviae whilst Cyrtoctenus specimens represent the actual mortalities, susceptible to scavengers.

In a 2019 graduate thesis, American geologist Emily Hughes suggested the synonymization of Hibbertopterus and Dunsopterus due to the "strong morphological similarities" between them, and as Dunsopterus was found to be paraphyletic in regards to Cyrtoctenus, all three were subsumed into just Hibbertopterus. In particular, she noted that though the feeding appendages were different, the ornamentation and form of the raking tools seen in Hibbertopterus were probably the precursors of the more moveable finger-like organs present in Cyrtoctenus. Hughes suggested that Vernonopterus, due to its distinct ornamentation, represented a genus distinct from Hibbertopterus. The same conclusions and suggestions were also published in a later 2020 conference abstract, co-authored by Hughes and James Lamsdell. However, a 2023 study describing a new species H. lamsdelli argued that Dunsopterus and Vernonopterus should be synonymized with Hibbertopterus, while Cyrtoctenus is distinct from it. In 2025, Lamsdell argued that Hibbertopterus, Dunsopterus, and Glyptoscorpius were distinct genera, with Cyrtoctenus a junior synonym of Dunsopterus and Vernonopterus a junior synonym of Glyptoscorpius. The fragmentary type remains of Glyptoscorpius have previously been argued to be fossils that belong to the very distantly related eurypterid Adelophthalmus.

== Palaeoecology ==
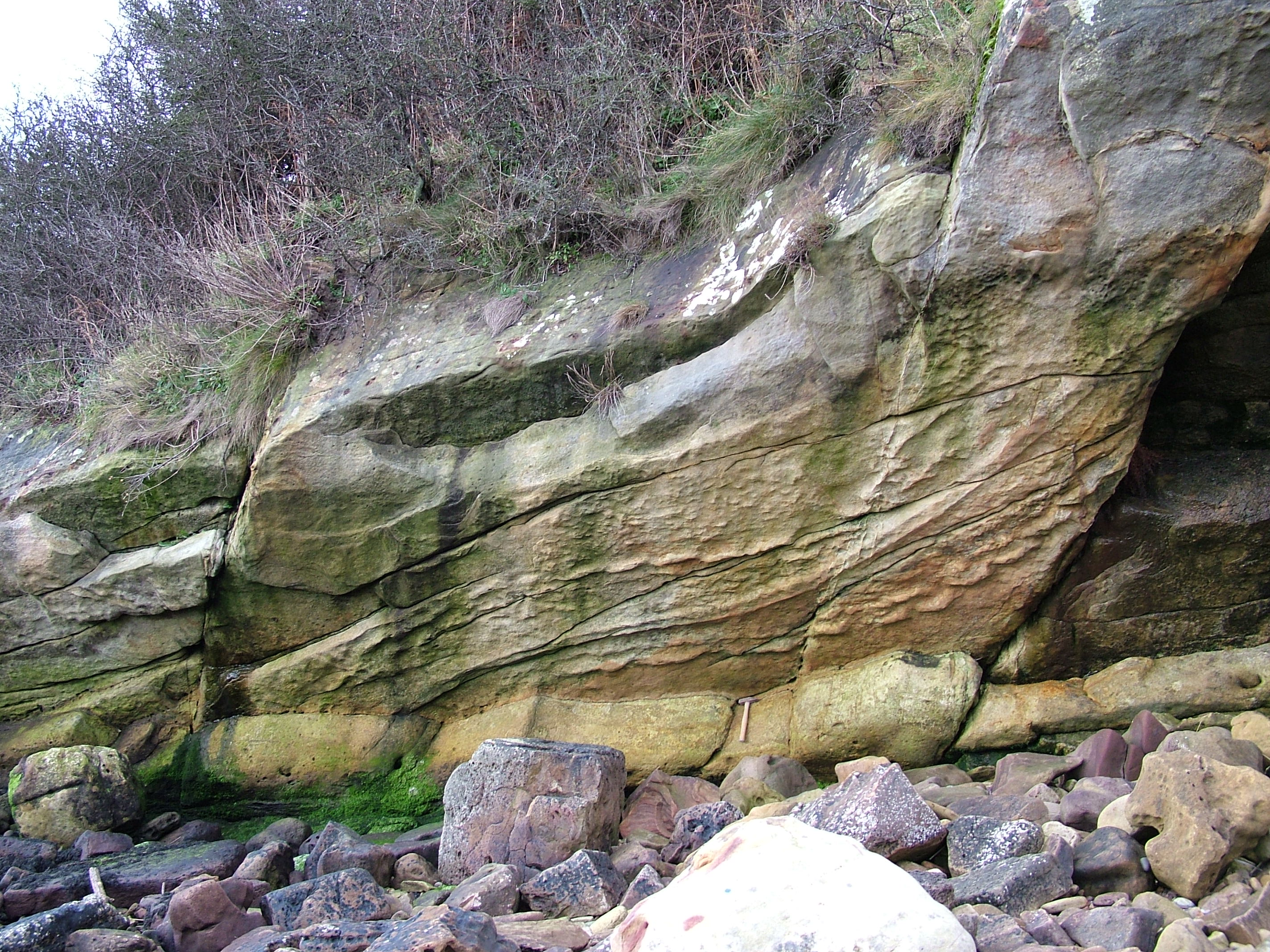
Fossil trackway discovered in Scotland, attributed to Hibbertopterus

Hibbertopterids such as Hibbertopterus were sweep-feeders, having modified spines on their forward-facing prosomal appendages that allowed them to rake through the substrate of their living environments. Though sweep-feeding was used as a strategy by many genera within the Stylonurina, it was most developed within the hibbertopterids, which possessed blades on the second, third and fourth pair of appendages. Inhabiting freshwater swamps and rivers, the diet of Hibbertopterus and other sweep-feeders was probably composed of what they could find raking through its living environment, likely primarily small invertebrates. This method of feeding is quite similar to filter feeding. This has led some researchers to suggest that Hibbertopterus would have been a pelagic animal, as modern filter feeding crustaceans, but the robust and massive nature of the genus (in contrast to modern filter feeding crustaceans which are typically very small) makes such a conclusion unlikely.

The chelicerae (pincers) of Hibbertopterus were weak and they would not have been able to grasp any potential prey which means Hibbertopterus would probably have been incapable of preying on larger animals. The conclusion that Hibbertopterus wasn't preying on large animals is also supported by the complete lack of adaptations towards any organs used for trapping prey in younger specimens (though they are present on adult specimens once referred to Cyrtoctenus) and a lack of swimming adaptations. Through sweep-feeding, Hibbertopterus could sweep up small animals from the soft sediments of shallow bodies of water, presumably small crustaceans and other arthropods, and could then sweep them into its mouth when it detected them. Through the different adaptations of juveniles and adults ("Cyrtoctenus"), individuals of different ages would possibly have preferred different types of prey, which would have reduced competition between members of the same genus.

A fossil trackway discovered near St Andrews in Fife, Scotland, reveals that Hibbertopterus was capable of at least limited terrestrial locomotion. The trackway found was roughly 6 metres (20 ft) long and 1 metre (3.3 ft) wide, and suggests that the eurypterid responsible was 160 centimetres (5.2 ft) long, consistent with other giant sizes attributed to Hibbertopterus. The tracks indicate a lumbering, jerky and dragging movement. Scarps with crescent-shapes were left by the outer limbs, inner markings were made by the keeled belly and the telson carved a central groove. The slow progression and dragging of the tail indicate that the animal responsible was moving out of water. The presence of terrestrial tracks indicate that Hibbertopterus was able to survive on land at least briefly, possible due to the probability that their gills could function in air as long as they remained wet. Additionally, some studies suggest that eurypterids possessed a dual respiratory system, which would allow short periods of time in terrestrial environments.

In the Midland Valley of Scotland, 27 kilometres (16.8 miles) to the west of Edinburgh, East Kirkton Quarry contains deposits that were once a freshwater lake near a volcano. The locality has preserved a diverse fauna of the Viséan age of the Carboniferous, with the units 66-88 dated to 341 ± 3 million years ago. Arthropod cuticles including that of scorpions and eurypterids are known across various units of the East Kirkton Limestone. All eurypterid material from the East Kirkton Limestone are provisionally referred to Hibbertopterus, with the exception of two isolated combs assigned to Cyrtoctenus and isolated femur assigned to cf. Dunsopterus, which may represent synonymous taxa. Other than H. scouleri, the fauna includes several terrestrial animals, such as anthracosaurs, aistopods, baphetids and temnospondyls, representing some of the oldest known terrestrial tetrapods. Several terrestrial invertebrates are also known from the location, including several indeterminate species of myriapods, large terrestrial scorpion Pulmonoscorpius, and early harvestman Brigantibunum. The site also preserves abundant plant life, including the genera Lepidodendron, Lepidophloios, Stigmaria and Sphenopteris. Locally, the strange fossil carapaces of H. scouleri have been given the common name "Scouler's heids" ("heid" being Scots for "head").

The Waaipoort Formation, where H. wittebergensis has been discovered, also preserves a diverse Carboniferous fauna and some species of plants. Interpreted as having been a large and open fresh to brackish water lake, with possibly occasional influences by storms and glacial processes, fossil remains recovered is most commonly that of various types of fish. Among these types are palaeoniscoids, sharks and acanthodians. Though shark material is too fragmentary to be identifiable, at least some fossils might represent the remains of protacrodontoids. Among the acanthodians, at least three genera have been identified from fossil scales and spines, including the derived climatiiform Gyracanthides. Among the palaeoniscoids, eight distinct genera have been identified. Several of these palaeoniscoid genera also occur in deposits of similar age in Scotland. Other than H. wittebergensis, the only known invertebrates are two rare species of bivalves, possibly representing unionids. Plant fossils in the Waaiport Formation are notably less diverse than those of preceding ages in the same location, possibly because of climate reasons. Among the genera present are the common Praeramunculus (possibly representing a progymnosperm) and Archaeosigillaria (a small type of lycopod).

== See also ==
- List of eurypterid genera
- Timeline of eurypterid research
- Largest prehistoric animals
