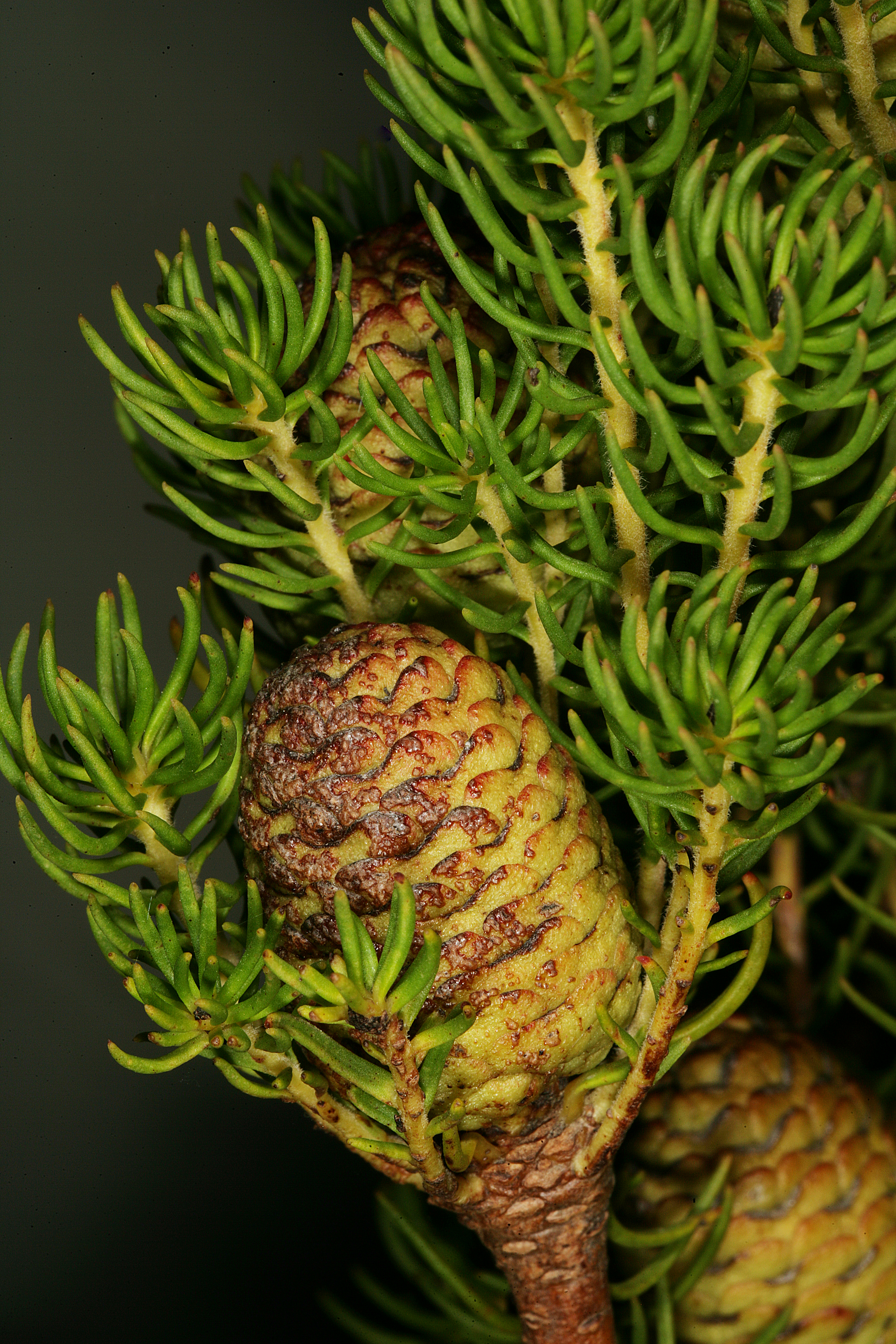

Conservation status
- Least Concern (IUCN 3.1)

Scientific classification
- Kingdom: Plantae
- Clade: Tracheophytes
- Clade: Angiosperms
- Clade: Eudicots
- Order: Proteales
- Family: Proteaceae
- Genus: Leucadendron
- Species: L. teretifolium

Binomial name
- Leucadendron teretifolium (Andrews) I.Williams

= Leucadendron teretifolium =

Species of plant

Leucadendron teretifolium, the needle-leaf conebush, is a flower-bearing shrub belonging to the genus Leucadendron and forms part of the fynbos. The plant is native to the Western Cape, South Africa.

== Description ==
The shrub grows 1 m (3.3 ft) tall and bears flowers from August to September. Fire destroys the plant but the seeds survive. The seeds are stored in a toll on the female plant and are released after a fire and are possibly spread by the wind. The plant is unisexual and there are male and female plants. It is fertilized by the wind.

In Afrikaans, it is known as waterbossie.

== Distribution and habitat ==
The plant occurs on the Elimvlakte, Kleinrivierberge, Riviersonderendberge, Potberg, Bonteberg, Witteberg, Waboomsberg, and Langeberg. It grows mainly in Bokkeveld and Witteberg type soils at heights of 0–1,350 m (0–4,429 ft).

== Gallery ==
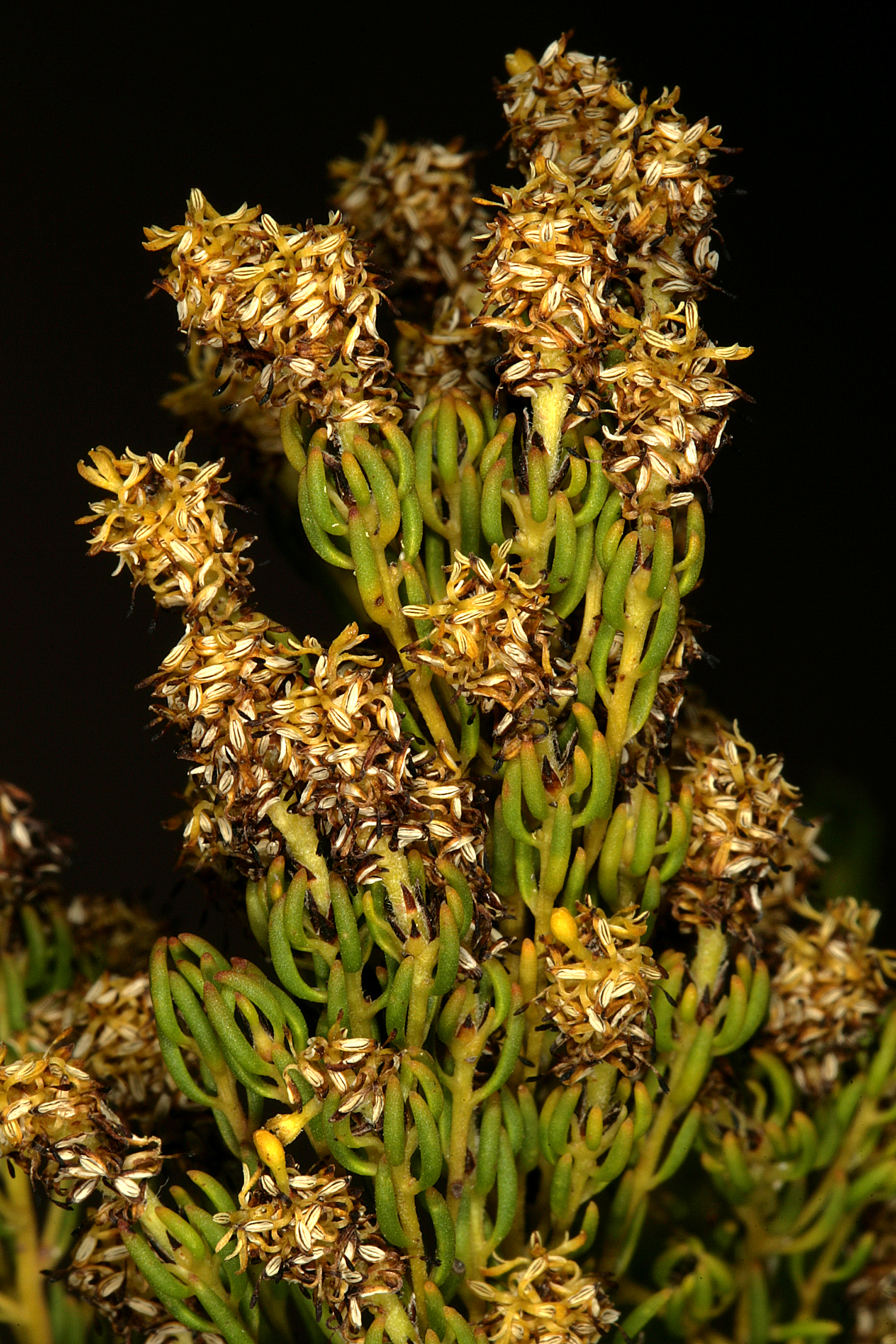

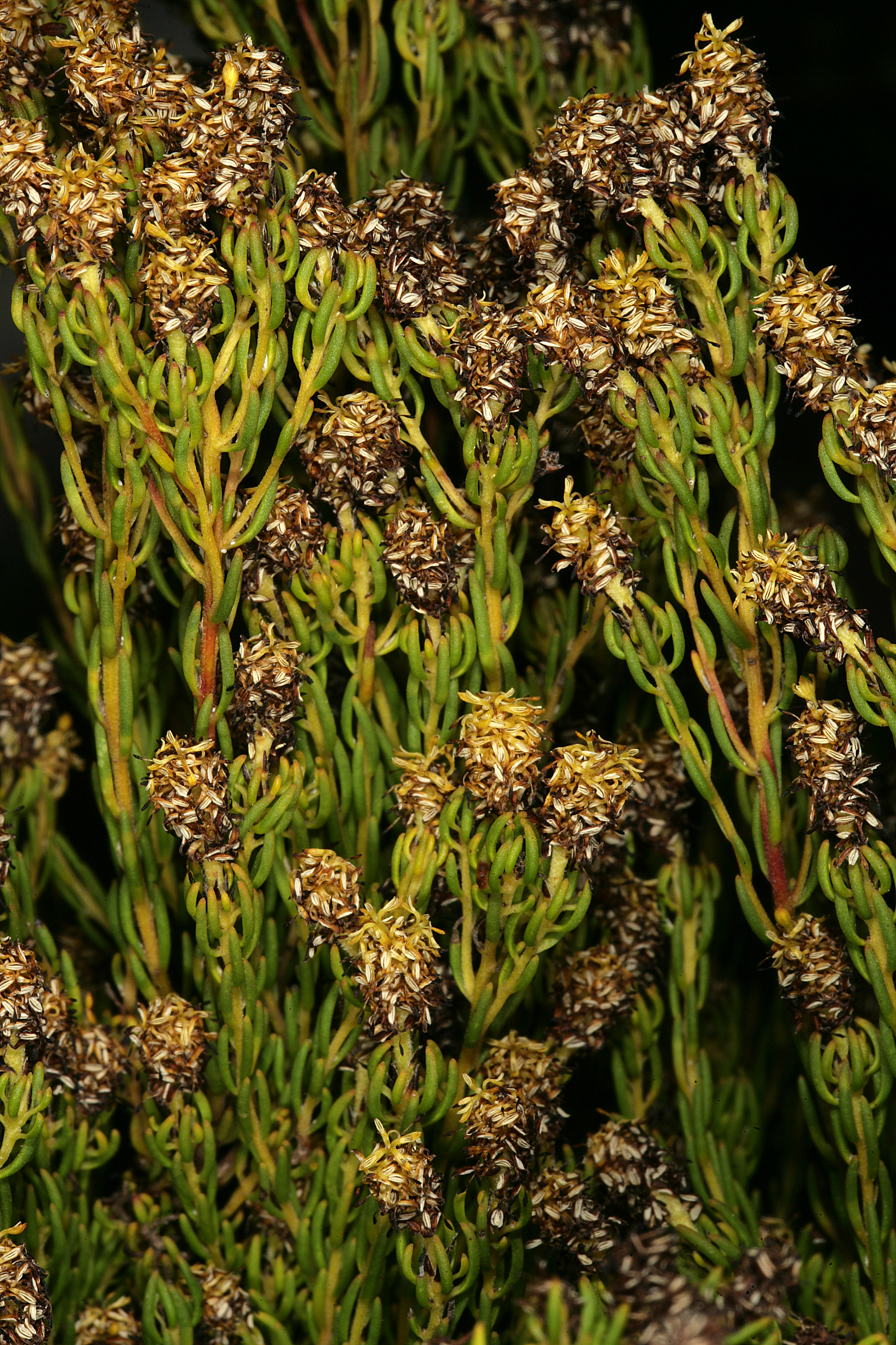

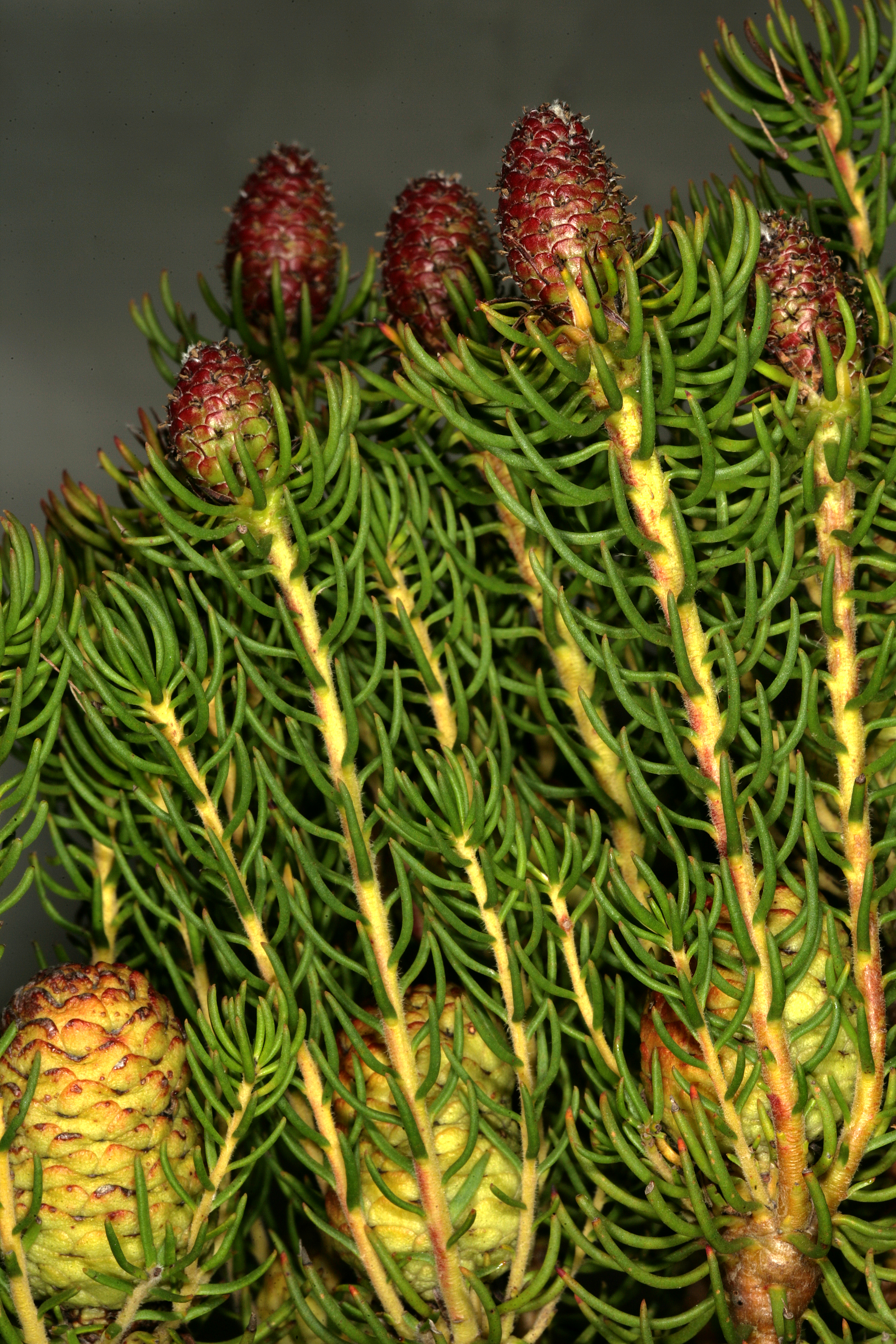

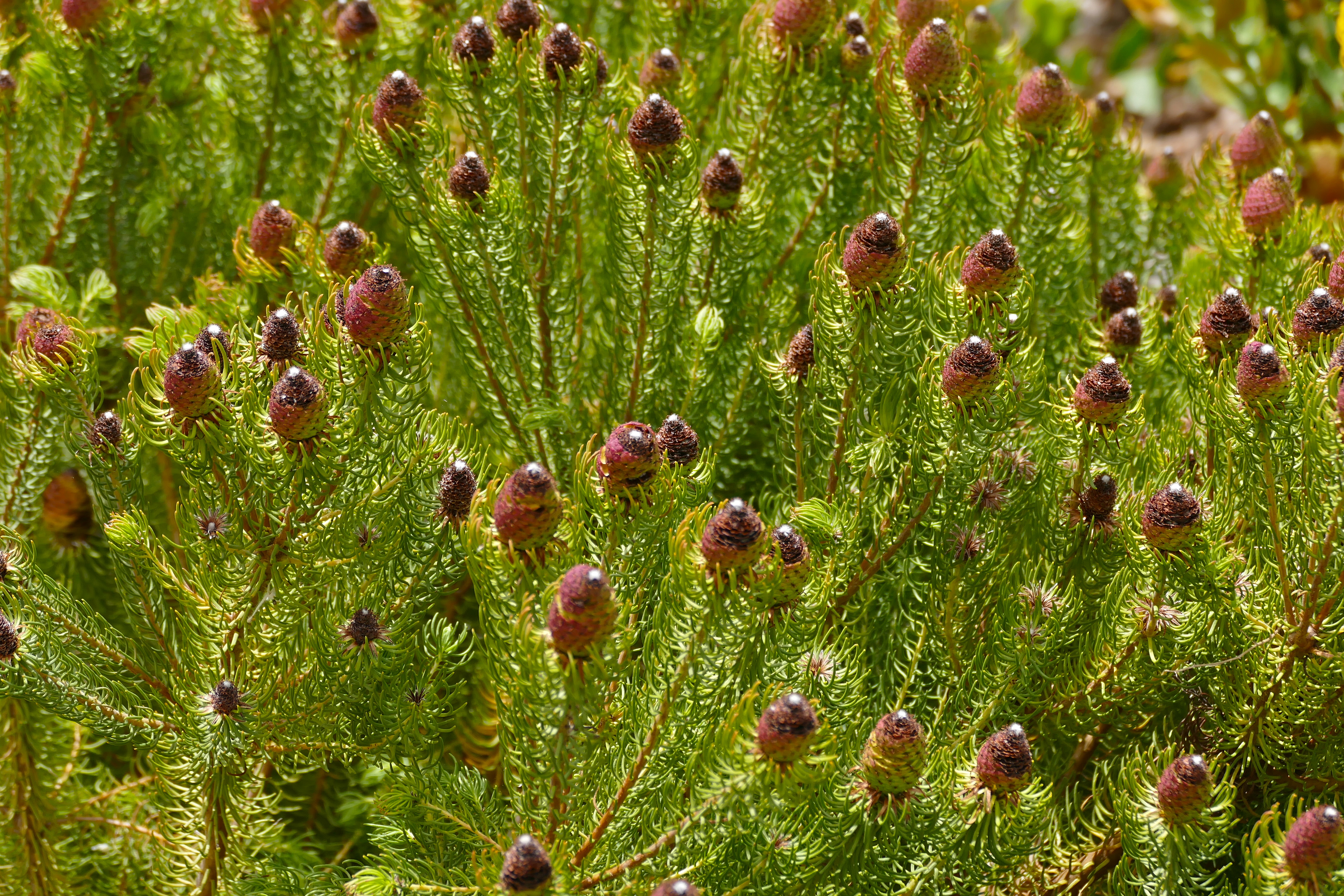
