= Waaipoort Formation =

Geologic formation in South Africa

- Stratigraphic range: Carboniferous (Visean)
- Type: Geological formation
- Unit of: Witteberg Group
- Overlies: Floriskraal Formation

Location
- Country: South Africa

The Waaipoort Formation is a geologic formation in South Africa. It preserves fossils dating back to the Visean, in the Carboniferous period.

== Geology ==
The Waaipoort formation consists of mudstones, siltstones, and fine sandstones and is around 35 meters thick. Fish-bearing localities are common and in most of these, the fish are present in calcitic or phosphatic nodules. At the Schiethoogte locality in the Eastern Cape, a 15 cm thick black layer made up of siltstone and fine sandstone contains two horizons where actinopterygian fossils are closely packed. These are thought to represent mass mortality events.

== Paleoenvironment ==
The Waaipoort formation has most commonly been interpreted as a marginal marine environment, possibly a lagoon or a delta. The fauna, composed mostly of paleoniscoids, is a large divergence from the predominantly placoderm- and sarcopterygian- dominated faunas of previous Witteberg Group formations like the Witpoort Formation.

== Fossil content ==
Color key: Taxon / Reclassified taxon / Taxon falsely reported as present / Dubious taxon or junior synonym / Ichnotaxon / Ootaxon / Morphotaxon

Notes
Uncertain or tentative taxa are in small text
~~crossed out~~ taxa are discredited.

=== Acanthodians ===
Acanthodians
Genus	Species	Clade	Images
Gyracanthides	G. sp.	Climatiiformes	Restoration of Gyracanthides murrayi

=== Chondrichthyes ===
Chondrichthyes
Genus	Species	Clade	Images
?Protacrodontidae	Protacrodontidae indet.	?Protacrodontidae	
?Plesioselachus	?Plesioselachus indet.		

=== Palaeonisciformes ===
Palaeonisciformes
Genus	Species	Clade	Images
Willowmorichthys	W. striatulus	Willowmorichthyidae	
Mentzichthys	M. walshi	Rhadinichthyidae	
Mentzichthys	M. jubbi	Rhadinichthyidae	
Mentzichthys	M. maraisi	Rhadinichthyidae	
Mentzichthys	M. theroni	Rhadinichthyidae	
Australichthys	A. longidorsalis	Holuridae	
Aesturichthys	A. fulcratus	Atherstoniidae	
Adroichthys	A. tuberculatus	Amphicentridae	
Sundayichthys	S. elegantulus	Canobiidae	
Soetendalichthys	S. cromptoni	Platysomidae	
Dwykia	D. analensis	Dwykiidae	

=== Eurypterids ===
Eurypterida
Genus	Species	Clade	Images
Hibbertopterus	C. wittebergensis	Hibbertopteroidea	Hibbertopterus wittebergensis

=== Bivalves ===
Bivalvia
Genus	Species	Clade	Images
2 undescribed species of ?Unionidae	2 undescribed species of ?Unionidae	?Unionidae	

=== Flora ===
Flora
Genus	Species	Clade	Images
Praeramunculus	P. striatiramus	?Progymnospermopsida	
Archaeosigillaria	A. caespitosa	Lycopodiopsida	

== See also ==
- List of fossiliferous stratigraphic units in South Africa
