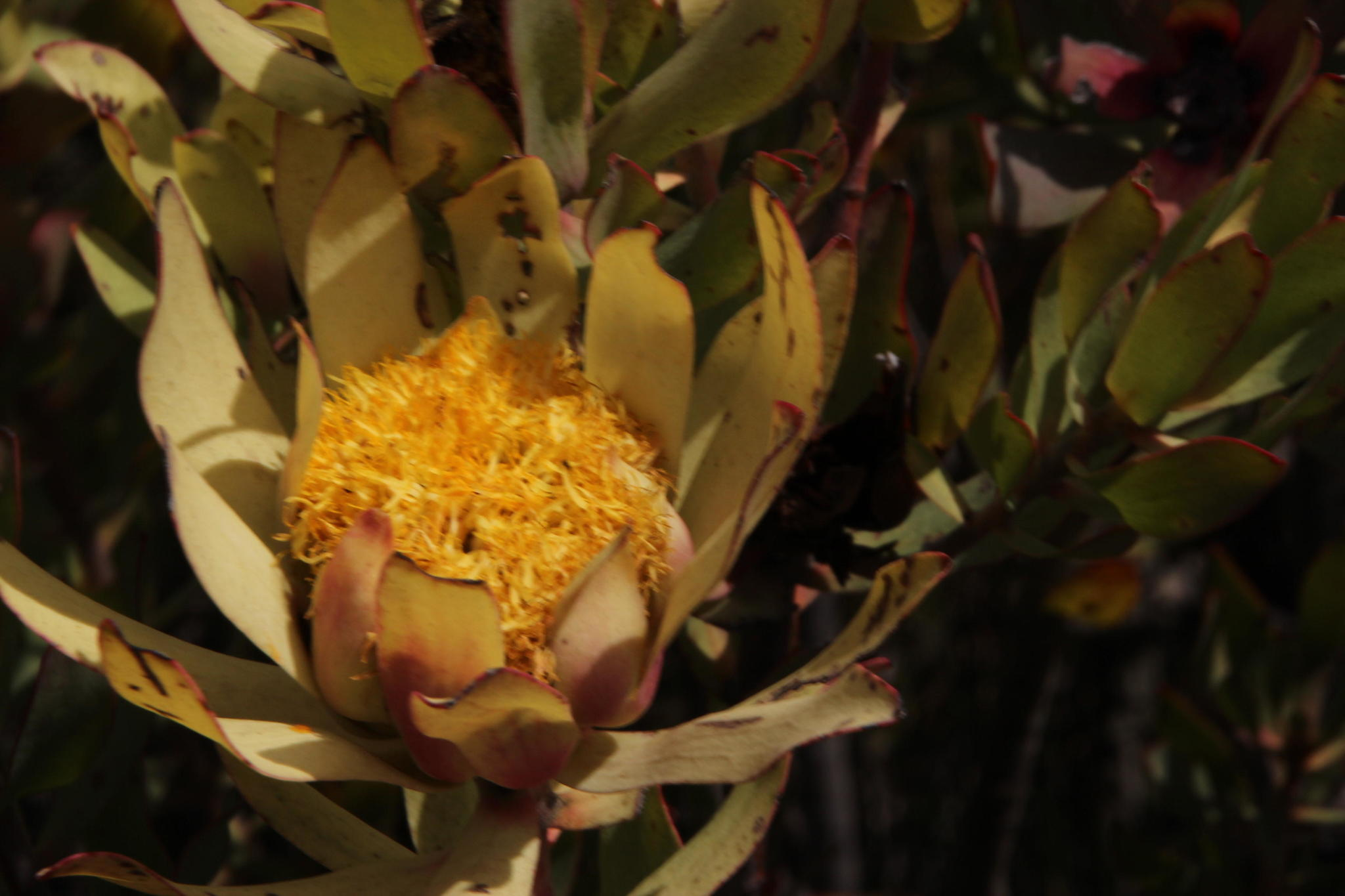

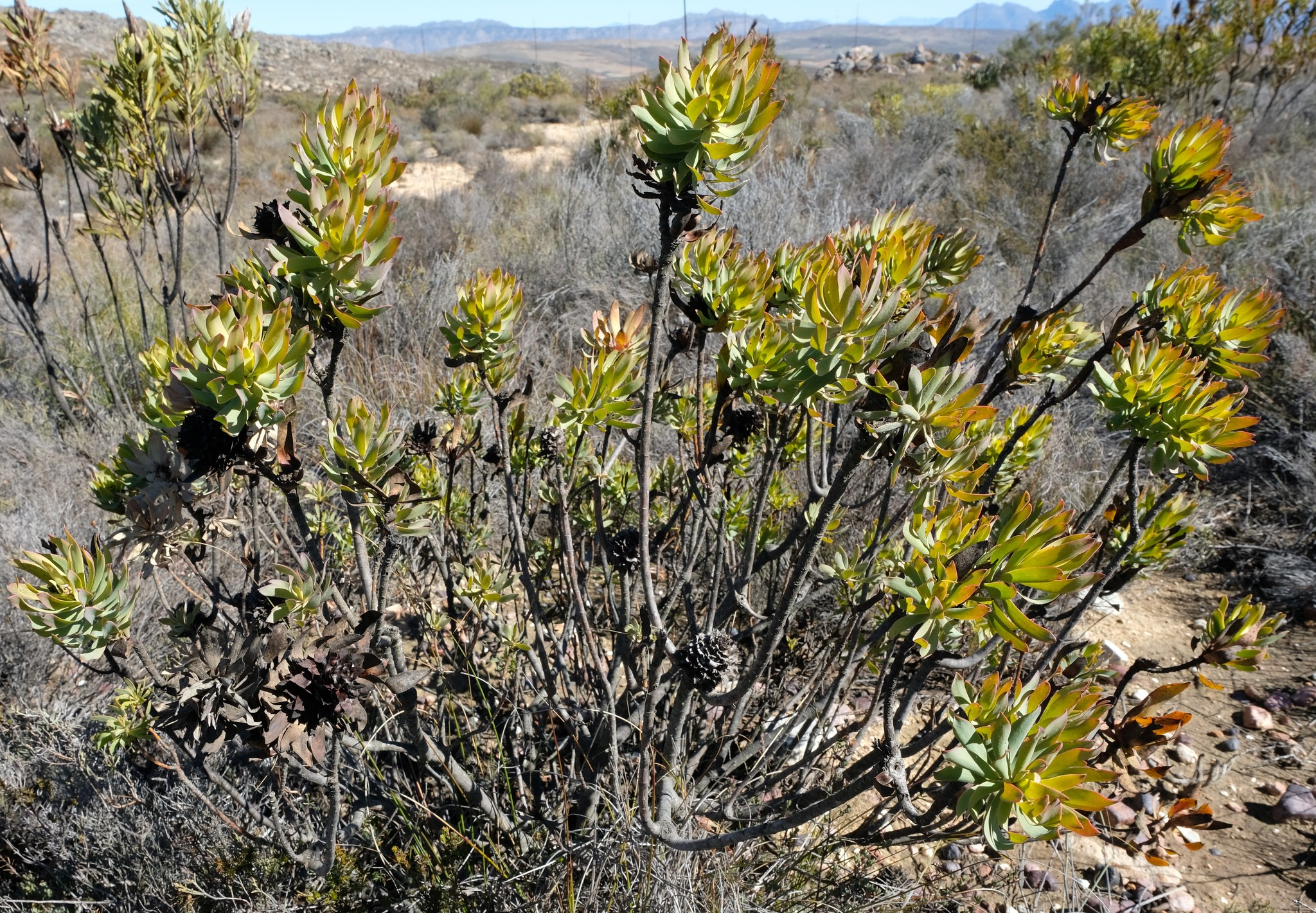

Conservation status
- Least Concern (IUCN 3.1)

Scientific classification
- Kingdom: Plantae
- Clade: Tracheophytes
- Clade: Angiosperms
- Clade: Eudicots
- Order: Proteales
- Family: Proteaceae
- Genus: Leucadendron
- Species: L. barkerae

Binomial name
- Leucadendron barkerae I.Williams

= Leucadendron barkerae =

Species of plant

Leucadendron barkerae, the Swartberg conebush, is a flower-bearing shrub that belongs to the genus Leucadendron and forms part of the fynbos. The plant is native to the Western Cape, South Africa.

== Description ==
The shrub grows 2 m (6.6 ft) tall and bears flowers from September to October.

In Afrikaans, it is known as the swartbergtolbos.

== Distribution and habitat ==
The plant occurs in the Bonteberg to Witteberg, Swartberg, Waboomsberg, and Koo at the Langeberg.

== Gallery ==
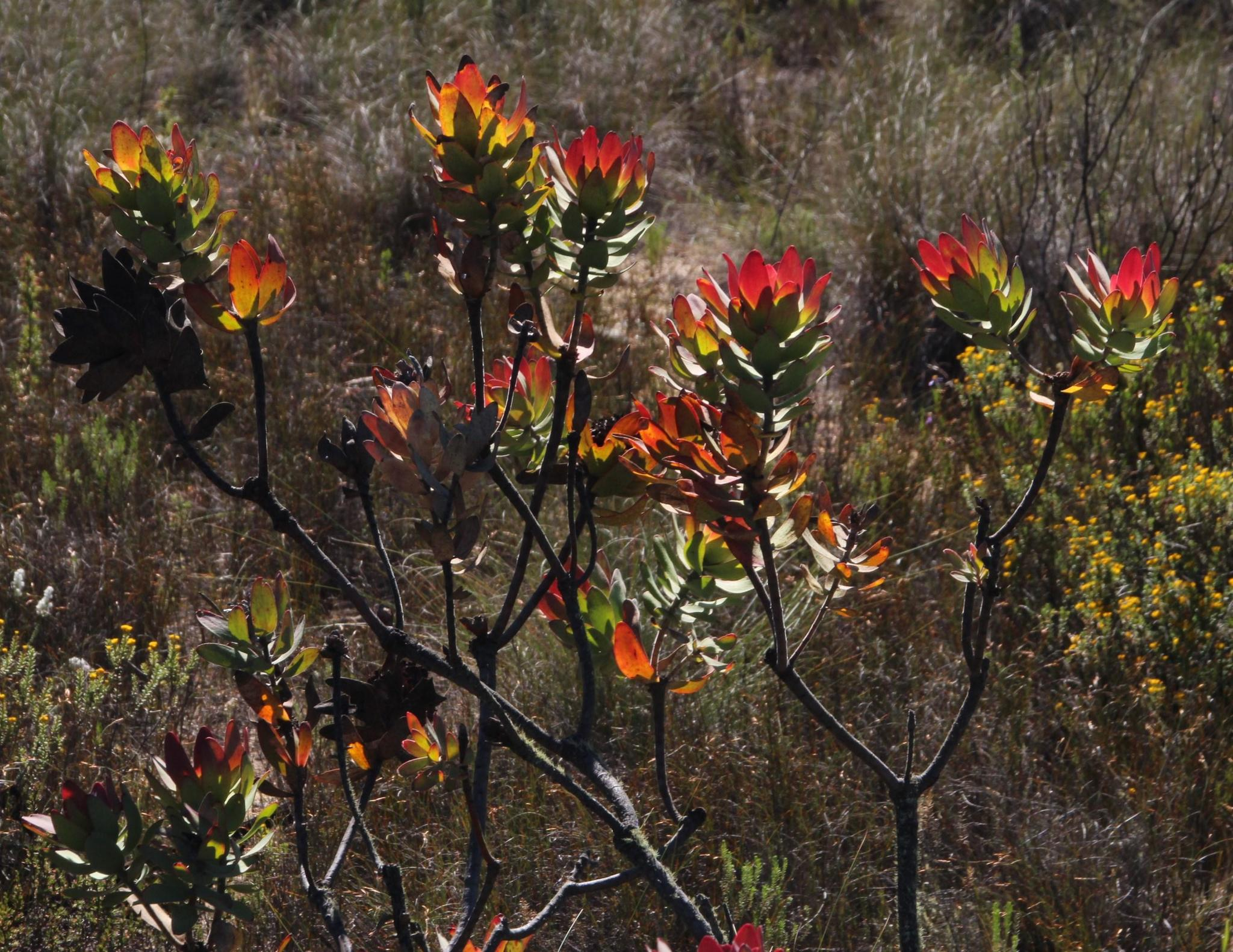

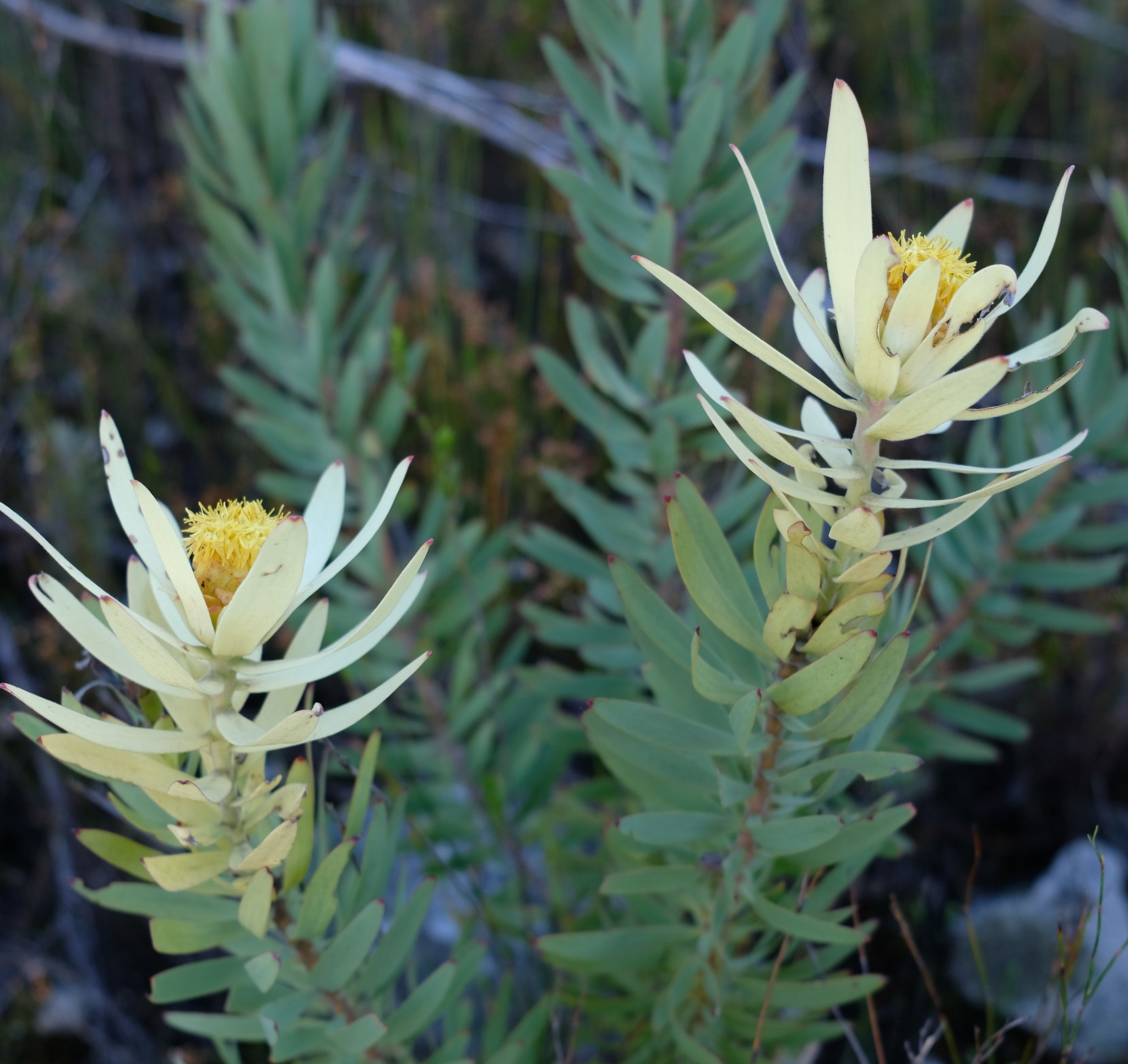

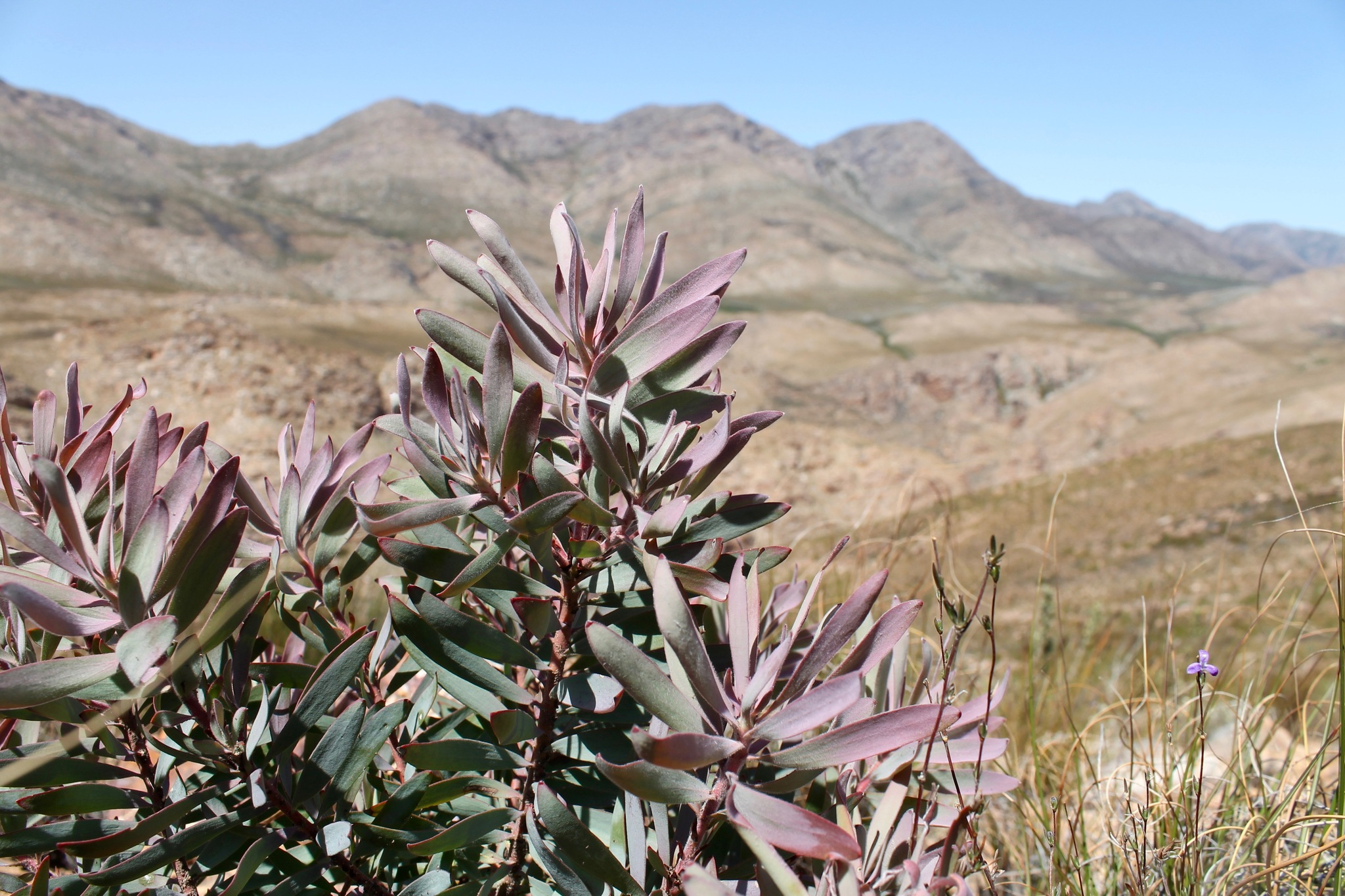
