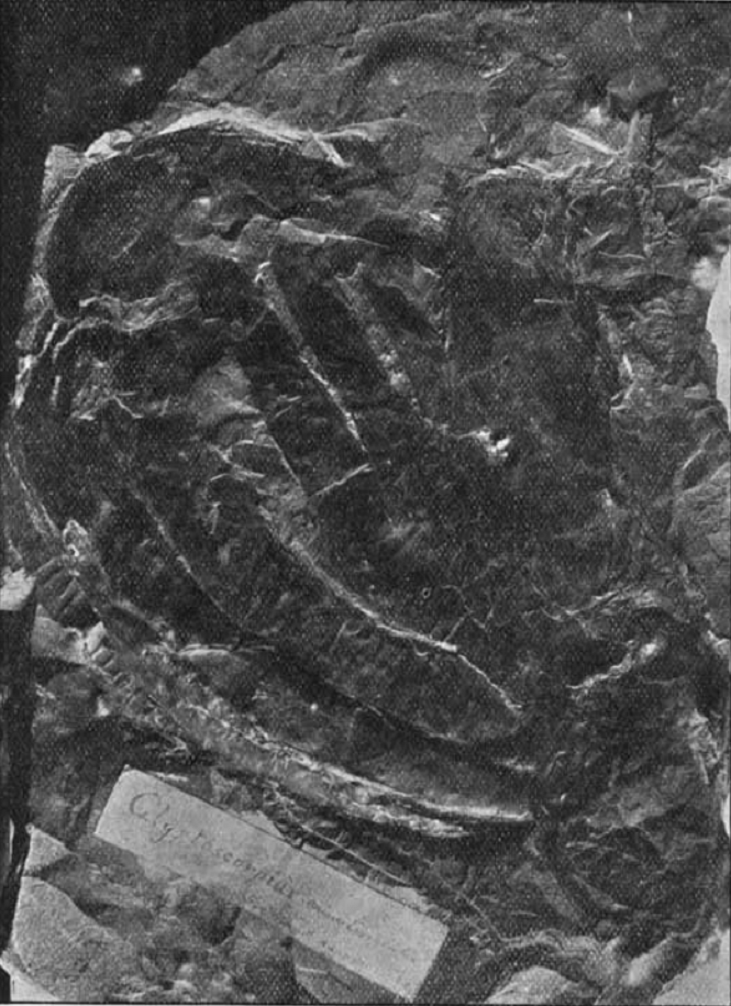
- Type specimen of V. minutisculptus

Scientific classification
- Kingdom: Animalia
- Phylum: Arthropoda
- Subphylum: Chelicerata
- Order: †Eurypterida
- Superfamily: †Mycteropoidea
- Family: †Hibbertopteridae
- Genus: †Vernonopterus; Waterston, 1968
- Species: †V. minutisculptus

Binomial name
- †Vernonopterus minutisculptus (Peach, 1905)

= Vernonopterus =

Vernonopterus Temporal range: Westphalian, 313–304 Ma

Extinct genus of arthropods

Vernonopterus is a genus of eurypterid, a group of extinct aquatic arthropods. Fossils of Vernonopterus have been discovered in deposits of the Carboniferous period in Scotland. The name of the genus derives from the location where the only known fossil has been discovered, Mount Vernon near Airdrie in Lanarkshire, Scotland. A single species of Vernonopterus is recognized, V. minutisculptus, based on fragmentary fossilized tergites, segments on the upper side of the abdomen. The species name minutisculptus refers to the ornamentation of scales that covers the entirety of the preserved parts of the eurypterid.

Although little can confidently be said about the appearance of Vernonopterus, it is likely to have been similar to its relatives within the hibbertopterid family, Hibbertopterus and Campylocephalus. The hibbertopterids were large eurypterids with broad heads and bodies and appendages developed for sweep-feeding, a technique involving blade-like adaptations to search for food in the substrate of its living environment. Compared to both Hibbertopterus and Campylocephalus, Vernonopterus would have been small, reaching lengths of about 50 centimetres (19.7 inches).

== Description ==
The estimated size of V. minutisculptus compared to a human

Classified as a member of the hibbertopterid family of eurypterids, Vernonopterus is assumed to have been overall similar to the other members of the family. The scant fossil remains attributed to the eurypterid suggests that it was a large and broad-bodied animal that probably measured around 50 centimetres (19.7 inches) in length.

Although limited in number by the fragmentary nature of the fossil remains, some distinguishing features of Vernonopterus have been established. In particular, the more posterior (further towards the back) tergites (segments on the upper side of the abdomen) tend to become more and more trilobate (shaped so that they almost have three distinct lobes), in the middle of the tergites the ornamentation (something typical of eurypterid exoskeletons) form a series of tracts that almost morph into three ridges. Due to the tergites being the only known parts of Vernonopterus, next to nothing can be said about other parts of its body such as the head and the appendages (limbs). They are likely to have resembled those of its relatives, where the carapace (exoskeleton covering the head) was large and broad (similar to the rest of the body) with appendages developed to sweep-feeding, a technique involving blade-like adaptations to search for food in the substrate of its living environment.

The ventral plates of Vernonopterus were granulated finely (had a rough surface) with small scales being present near the posterior borders of the plates. In the middle of the tergites, the ornamentation is more pronounced than at their borders, taking the form of semi-lunar (almost moon-shaped) scales. Further back on the eurypterids' body, these scales change into larger scales grouped into large longitudinal ridges. On the borders of the later tergites, these large scales protrude and form structures similar to crenulations. The longitudinal ridges divide the tergites of Vernonopterus into axial (spine) and pleural (ribs) parts, which differentiates it from all other hibbertopterids.

== History of research ==
The holotype and only known specimen of Vernonopterus was discovered by local fossil hunter Robert Dunlop in coal measures at Mount Vernon near Airdrie in Lanarkshire, Scotland in 1884. The fossil, at the present stored at the Royal Scottish Museum with the specimen number 1957.1.4992, consists of a series of fragmentary tergites. It wasn't described scientifically until 1905, when British geologist Ben Peach described the specimen and assigned it to a new species of the genus Glyptoscorpius (a name today recognized as synonymous with Adelophthalmus) as G. minutisculptus. Peach's description has been criticized by later researchers as inadequate and in some ways misleading. Peach considered the fossil's horizon to prove that Glyptoscorpius was a land animal since it was preserved alongside plant fossils. The specific name minutisculptus refers to the ornamentation that covers the entirety of the preserved portions of the animal.

The specimen was given a more complete description by British geologist Charles D. Waterston in 1957, who instead referred it to the genus Eurypterus as E. minutisculptus. By this time it had been encased in a collar of "fibrenyle" packaging (a type of plastic) to give strength to and preserve the very fragile fossil. Features revealed during Waterston's second examination of the fossil in 1968 made it clear that the eurypterid was not congeneric with known species of Eurypterus, nor part of the eurypterine suborder (eurypterids that possessed swimming paddles) at all. Instead, Waterston inferred that E. minutisculptus had very clearly been a broad-bodied and large eurypterid, although any detailed statements about the prosoma (head), appendages and the telson (the posteriormost division of the body, often taking the shape of a tail spike) could not be made as those portions of the body were unknown. Waterston created a new genus to contain the species, Vernonopterus, with the name deriving from the location where the fossil had been found, Mount Vernon. Waterston referred the new genus to the family "Woodwardopteridae" (now referred to as the Mycteroptidae), but no particular reasoning was given.

Vernonopterus was assigned to Hibbertopterus by Cuban paleontolgost Erik N. Kjellesvig-Waering in 1966 as H. minutisculptus, but he noted that this classification was not certain. Similarities between the Vernonopterus specimen and specimens referred to Dunsopterus (today recognized as a junior synonym of Hibbertopterus) were noted by Waterston and Norwegian paleontologist Leif Størmer in 1968. Modern researchers classify the genus within the Hibbertopteridae instead, sometimes noting that its position is somewhat uncertain due to its fragmentary nature.

== Classification ==
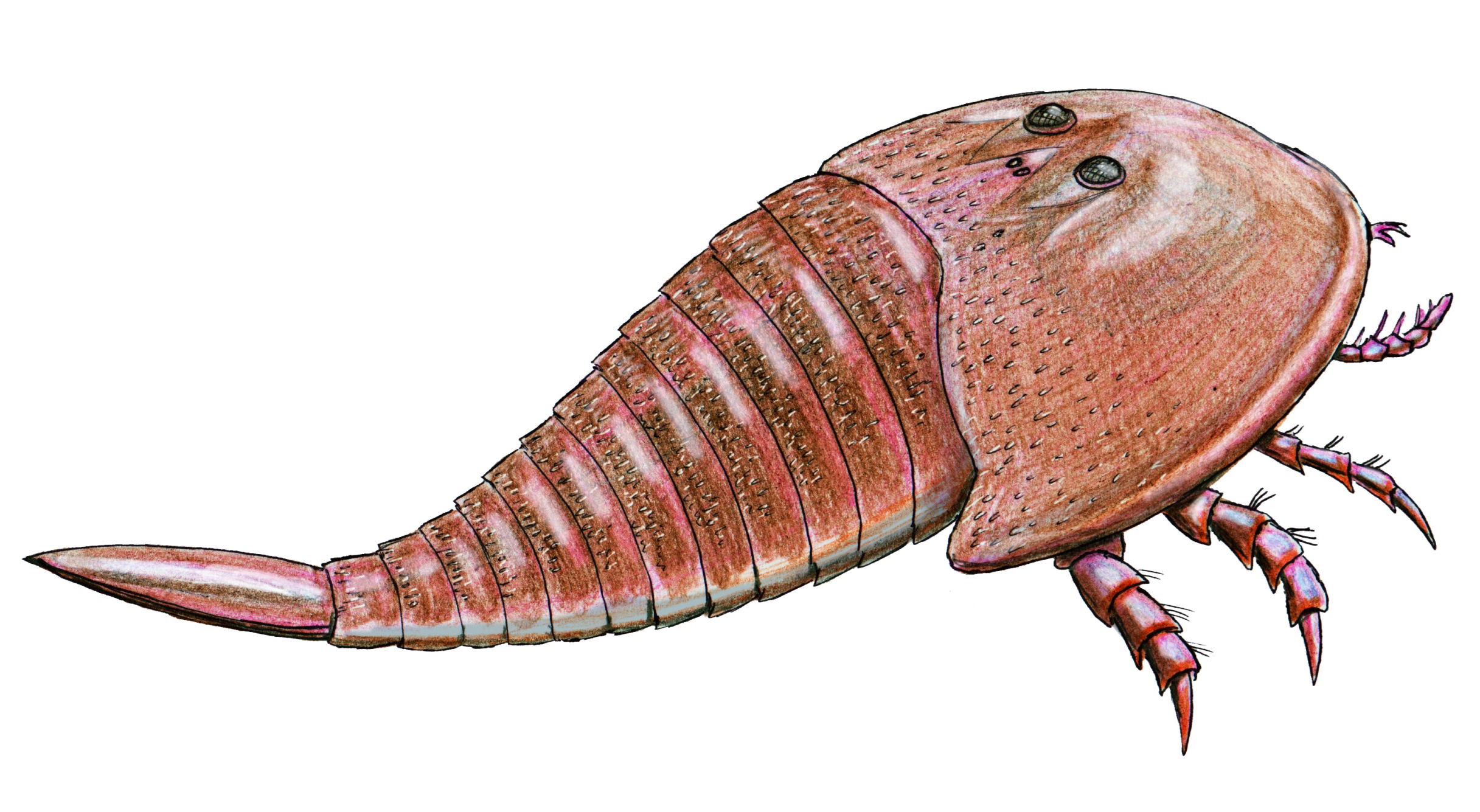
Reconstruction of the related Hibbertopterus, a more completely known hibbertopterid eurypterid.

Vernonopterus is classified as part of the family Hibbertopteridae, a family of eurypterids within the superfamily Mycteropoidea, alongside the genera Hibbertopterus and Campylocephalus. The genus contains one species; V. minutisculptus from the Carboniferous of Lanarkshire, Scotland.

The hibbertopterids are united as a group by being large mycteropoids with broad prosomas, a hastate (e.g. shaped like a gladius, a Roman sword) telson with paired keels on the ventral side, ornamentation consisting of scales or other similar structures on the exoskeleton, the fourth pair of appendages possessing spines, the more posterior tergites of the abdomen possessing tongue-shaped scales near their edges and there being lobes positioned posterolaterally (posteriorly on both sides) on the prosoma.

The features of Campylocephalus and Vernonopterus makes it clear that both genera represent hibbertopterid eurypterids, but the incomplete nature of all fossil specimens referred to them make any further study of the precise phylogenetic relationships within the Hibbertopteridae difficult. Both genera could even represent synonyms of Hibbertopterus itself, though the highly incomplete nature of their remains again makes that hypothesis impossible to confirm.

By comparing the ornamentation of various hibbertopterids in 2019, American geologist Emily Hughes could conclude that several genera were actually congeneric, subsuming some previously recognized hibbertopterids (such as Cyrtoctenus) into Hibbertopterus. She noted that the distinct ornamentation of Vernonopterus supported it as a distinct genus. In 2023, Braddy et al. synonymized Vernonopterus with Hibbertopterus. In 2025, Lamsdell however considered the genera distinct, but considered Vernonopterus to be a junior synonym of Glyptoscorpius. The fragmentary type remains of Glyptoscorpius have previously been argued to be fossils that belong to the very distantly related eurypterid Adelophthalmus.

== Paleoecology ==
Vernonopterus lived during the Westphalian age in modern-day Lanarkshire, Scotland. Though they probably would not have been prey items to Vernonopterus, a diverse contemporary fauna of actinopterygian fish are known from Lanarkshire as well, including species such as Rhadinichthys ornatocephalum, R. glabrolepis, R. plumosum, Pseudogonatodus aurulentum and Lanarkichthys gardineri. Out of this actinopterygian diversity, there are many haplolepid fishes, a small and basal group, known, including Blairolepis wallacei, Parahaplolepis poppaea, P. elenae, P. alexandrae, Braccohaplolepis fenestratum, Andrewsolepis lochlani, Protohaplolepis isabellae, P. limnades, P. traquairi, Pyritocephalus youngii and Millerolepis eleionomae. Vernonopterus and these fish would have lived in a brackish fresh water environment.

Hibbertopterids such as Vernonopterus were sweep-feeders, having modified spines on their forward-facing prosomal appendages that allowed them to rake through the substrate of their living environments. Though sweep-feeding was used as a strategy by many genera within the Stylonurina, it was most developed within the hibbertopterids, which possessed blades on the second, third and fourth pair of appendages. Some species of the closely related Hibbertopterus had specialized comb-like rachis (shafts) that were able to entrap small prey and other organic food particles.

Though they would have been slow owing to their massive size and robust form, studies on Hibbertopterus footprints discovered in Scotland have demonstrated that hibbertopterids would have been able to walk on land for at least short periods of time. The tracks discovered indicate that they would have utilized a lumbering, jerking and dragging movement and that the keeled belly and the telson left a central groove behind. Some studies suggest that eurypterids possessed a dual respiratory system (capable of breathing in both air and underwater), which would have allowed for this kind of occasional terrestrial movement.

== See also ==
- List of eurypterid genera
- Timeline of eurypterid research
