= Gardinerpiscis =

Gardinerpiscis Temporal range: Kungurian

Scientific classification
- Kingdom: Animalia
- Phylum: Chordata
- Class: Actinopterygii
- Family: †Karaunguriidae
- Genus: †Gardinerpiscis; Romano & Kogan, 2015
- Species: †G. akkolkensis

Binomial name
- †Gardinerpiscis akkolkensis (Kazantseva-Selezneva, 1981)

Synonyms
- Gardineria akkolkensis Kazantseva-Selezneva, 1981

Extinct genus of fishes

Gardinerpiscis is an extinct genus of prehistoric freshwater actinopterygian fish that lived during the Kungurian age of the early Permian epoch in the Kempir Formation of what is now Kazakhstan. It was originally named "Gardineria" by Kazantseva-Selezneva (1981). Because this genus name was already given to an extant scleractinian coral (Gardineria Vaughan, 1907), the new name Gardinerpiscis was erected for the Permian fish. The genus includes a single species (monotypy): Gardinerpiscis akkolkensis.

Gardinerpiscis is named after British palaeontologist and zoologist Brian G. Gardiner (1932 - 2021). The word part piscis is Latin for fish.

== See also ==
- Prehistoric fish
- List of prehistoric bony fish
