= Dwykia =

Dwykia Temporal range: Tournaisian

Scientific classification
- Kingdom: Animalia
- Phylum: Chordata
- Class: Actinopterygii
- Family: †Dwykiidae; Gardiner, 1969
- Genus: †Dwykia; Gardiner, 1969
- Species: †D. analensis

Binomial name
- †Dwykia analensis Gardiner, 1969

Extinct genus of fishes

Dwykia (named after the overlying Dwyka Group) is an extinct genus of prehistoric freshwater ray-finned fish that lived during the early Carboniferous period (Tournaisian age) in what is now South Africa. It contains a single species, D. analensis from the Waaipoort Formation of the Upper Witteberg Series. It is one of a number of early fish genera long placed in the likely paraphyletic order Palaeonisciformes.

== See also ==
- Prehistoric fish
- List of prehistoric bony fish
