= Willomorichthys =

Willomorichthys Temporal range: Visean

Scientific classification
- Domain: Eukaryota
- Kingdom: Animalia
- Phylum: Chordata
- Class: Actinopterygii
- Order: †Palaeonisciformes
- Family: †Willomorichthyidae
- Genus: †Willomorichthys; Gardiner, 1969

Type species
- Willomorichthys striatulus Gardiner, 1969

Extinct genus of fishes

Willomorichthys is an extinct genus of prehistoric bony fish that lived during the Carboniferous period (Visean age) in what is now South Africa. Fossils were recovered from the Upper Witteberg Series.

== See also ==
- Prehistoric fish
- List of prehistoric bony fish
