= Gardinerichthys =

Gardinerichthys Temporal range: Early Permian–Middle Permian

Scientific classification
- Kingdom: Animalia
- Phylum: Chordata
- Class: Actinopterygii
- Order: †Paramblypteriformes
- Genus: †Gardinerichthys; Heyler, 1976

Type species
- †Gardinerichthys latus (Gardiner, 1963)

Other species
- †G. tewarii Gupta et al., 1978

Genus of fishes

Gardinerichthys is an extinct genus of freshwater actinopterygian bony fish from the Cisuralian (early Permian) epoch of Germany (Rhineland-Palatine, Saarland), and the middle Permian of India (Jammu and Kashmir). The type species, G. latus, was discovered in Asselian aged layers (Rotliegend). The genus is named after British palaeontologist and zoologist Brian G. Gardiner (1932–2021), with the second part of the name meaning 'fish' in Greek: ἰχθῦς (ikhthûs).

The type specimen was originally thought to belong to the type species of Amblypterus, A. latus, but a reconstruction by Gardiner in 1963 determined it to be a different fish from Amblypterus. It was described as a new genus in 1976.

== See also ==
- Prehistoric fish
- List of prehistoric bony fish
