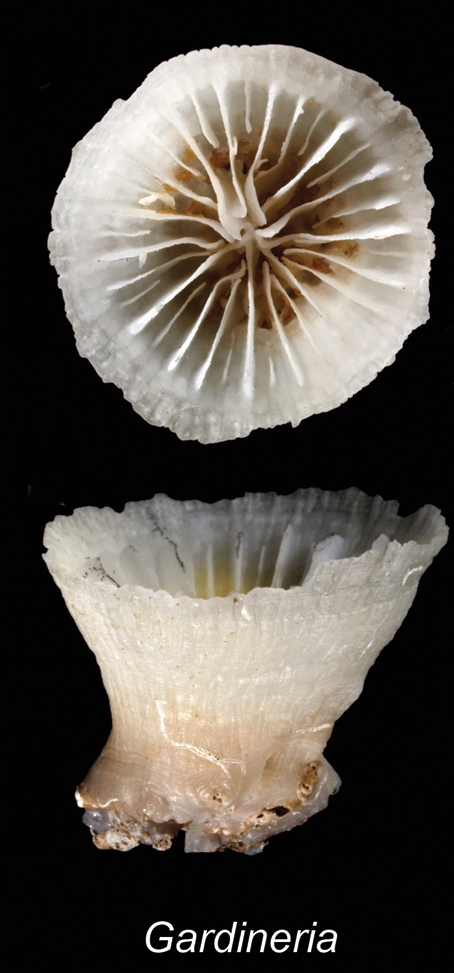
- Gardineria hawaiiensis

Scientific classification
- Kingdom: Animalia
- Phylum: Cnidaria
- Subphylum: Anthozoa
- Class: Hexacorallia
- Order: Scleractinia
- Family: Gardineriidae

= Gardineriidae =

Family of corals

Gardineriidae is a family of corals belonging to the order Scleractinia.

Genera:

- Adkinsella Wells, 1933
- Gardineria Vaughan, 1907
- Stolarskicyathus Cairns, 2004
