= Brian G. Gardiner (biologist) =

British palaeontologist and zoologist (1932–2021)

Brian George Gardiner
- Born: 30 October 1932; Cashes Green
- Died: 21 January 2021 (aged 88); London
- Occupation: Palaeontologist

Brian George Gardiner PPLS (30 October 1932 – 21 January 2021) was a British palaeontologist and zoologist, specialising in the study of fossil fish (palaeoichthyology).

== Early life and education ==
Gardiner was born on 30 October 1932 in Cashes Green, Gloucestershire. He was educated at Marling School, Stroud and then took a first degree in zoology at Imperial College London, where he specialised in entomology. This was followed by a PhD in palaeontology at University College London at which time he was a scientific associate at the Natural History Museum, London.

== Academic career ==
Gardiner was appointed an assistant lecturer in palaeontology at Queen Elizabeth College in 1958, and was later made Professor of Palaeontology at the Department of Biology at the same college. Queen Elizabeth College later merged with King's College London (1985). In 1963, he worked on secondment at the University of Alberta, Edmonton. In 1969, Gardiner described seven new genera and species of palaeoniscid fish from the Witteberg Series in South Africa. He was president of the Linnean Society of London 1994–1997, and was later made a Fellow Honoris Causa of the same society. He was an advisor on palaeontology to the Natural History Museum in London.

His research interests were in the anatomy, taxonomy and evolution of fish, particularly actinopterygians, including Devonian palaeoniscids.

Gardiner also investigated the celebrated Piltdown Man palaeontological forgery.

Gardiner retired from King's College in 1998.

== Legacy ==
Gardiner named seven genera of Carboniferous ray-finned fish, Australichthys, Aestuarichthys, Willomorichthys, Sundayichthys, Dwykia, Adroichthys and Soetendalichthys (=Aestuarichthys), and two genera of Triassic ray-finned fish, Albertonia and Endemichthys.

Two genera of Permian palaeoniscoid fish, Gardinerichthys and Gardinerpiscis, were named in his honour.

== Marriage and children ==
Gardiner married Elizabeth Jameson in 1961. They had three children; Nicholas, Catherine and Clare.

== Death ==
Gardiner died in London on 21 January 2021, aged 88. He was survived by his wife, three children and seven grandchildren.

== Selected publications ==
- Gardiner, B G (1966). Catalogue of Canadian fossil fishes. Contribution (Royal Ontario Museum. Life Sciences Division). Toronto: University of Toronto Press. p. 154. doi:10.5962/bhl.title.52135.
- Gardiner, B G (1969). "New palaeoniscoid fish from the Witteberg series of South Africa". Zoological Journal of the Linnean Society. 48 (4): 423–452. doi:10.1111/j.1096-3642.1969.tb00722.x.
- Gardiner, B G (1982). "Tetrapod classification". Zoological Journal of the Linnean Society. 74 (3): 207–32. doi:10.1111/j.1096-3642.1982.tb01148.x.
- Gardiner, B G (1984). Devonian Palaeoniscid Fishes: New Specimens of Mimia and Moythomasia from the Upper Devonian of Western Australia. University of California Press. p. 256.
- Gardiner, B G (1984). "The relationship of placoderms". Journal of Vertebrate Paleontology. 4 (3): 379–395. Bibcode:1984JVPal...4..379G. doi:10.1080/02724634.1984.10012017.
- Gardiner, B G; Schaeffer, B (1989). "Interrelationships of lower actinopterygian fishes". Zoological Journal of the Linnean Society. 92 (2): 135–187. doi:10.1111/j.1096-3642.1989.tb00550.x..
- Gardiner, B G; Miles, R S (1994). "Eubrachythoracid arthrodires from Gogo, Western Australia". Zoological Journal of the Linnean Society. 112 (4): 443–477. doi:10.1006/zjls.1994.1053.
- Gardiner, B G; Schaeffer, B; Masserie, J A (2005). "A review of lower actinopterygian phylogeny". Zoological Journal of the Linnean Society. 144 (4): 511–525. doi:10.1111/j.1096-3642.2005.00181.x. S2CID 84627237.
