= Samuel Hibbert-Ware =

British geologist and antiquarian (1782–1848)

Samuel Hibbert-Ware FRSE FSA
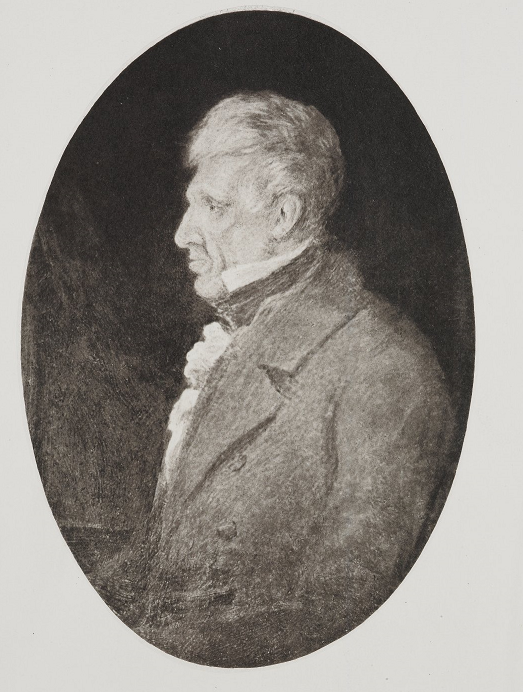
- Born: 21 April 1782; Manchester
- Died: 30 December 1848 (aged 66); Altrincham
- Occupation: Geologist

Samuel Hibbert-Ware FRSE FSA (21 April 1782 – 30 December 1848), born Samuel Hibbert in St Ann's Square Manchester, was an English geologist and antiquarian.

== Life ==
He was the eldest son of Samuel Hibbert (d.1815), a linen yarn merchant, and his wife Sarah Ware, from Dublin.

Hibbert was granted an MD and became a Fellow of the Royal Society of Edinburgh. He served as the secretary of the Society of Scottish Antiquarians, a member of the Royal Medical and Wernerian Societies of Edinburgh, as well as a member of the Manchester Literary and Philosophical Society being elected on 5 March 1895.

His book Sketches of the Philosophy of Apparitions (1825) is an early skeptical work that gave possible physical and physiological explanations for sightings of ghosts.

He died at Hale Barns, Altrincham in Cheshire on 30 December 1848. He is buried in Ardwick cemetery in Manchester.

== Publications ==
- A Description of the Shetland Islands: Comprising an Account of their Scenery, Antiquities and Superstitions (1822) Reprinted 1891.
- Illustration of the Customs of a Manor in the North of England During the Fifteenth Century (1822)
- Sketches of the Philosophy of Apparitions; Or, An Attempt to Trace Such Illusions to Their Physical Causes (1825)
- History of the Extinct Volcanos of the Basin of Neuwied, on the Lower Rhine (1832)
- On the Fresh-Water Limestone of Burdiehouse in the Neighbourhood of Edinburgh (1835)
- Lancashire Memorials of the Rebellion, MDCCXV (1845)
