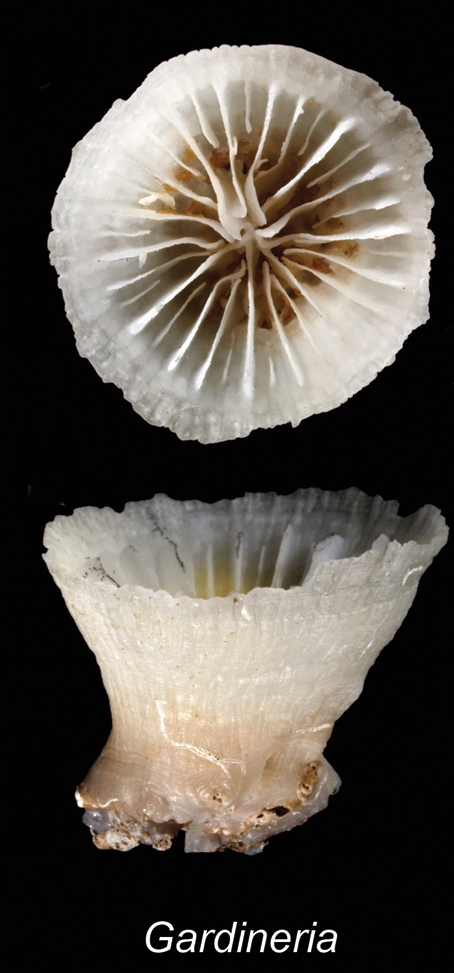
- Gardineria hawaiiensis

Scientific classification
- Domain: Eukaryota
- Kingdom: Animalia
- Phylum: Cnidaria
- Subphylum: Anthozoa
- Class: Hexacorallia
- Order: Scleractinia
- Family: Gardineriidae
- Genus: Gardineria; Vaughan, 1907

= Gardineria (coral) =

Genus of corals

Gardineria is a genus of corals belonging to the family Gardineriidae.

The species of this genus are found in Pacific, Indian and Atlantic Ocean.

Species:

- Gardineria hawaiiensis Vaughan, 1907
- Gardineria minor Wells, 1973
- Gardineria paradoxa (Pourtalès, 1868)
- Gardineria philippinensis Cairns, 1989
- Gardineria simojovelensis Frost & Langenheim, 1974
- Gardineria simplex (Pourtalès, 1878)
