= Witteberg =

Mountain range in South Africa

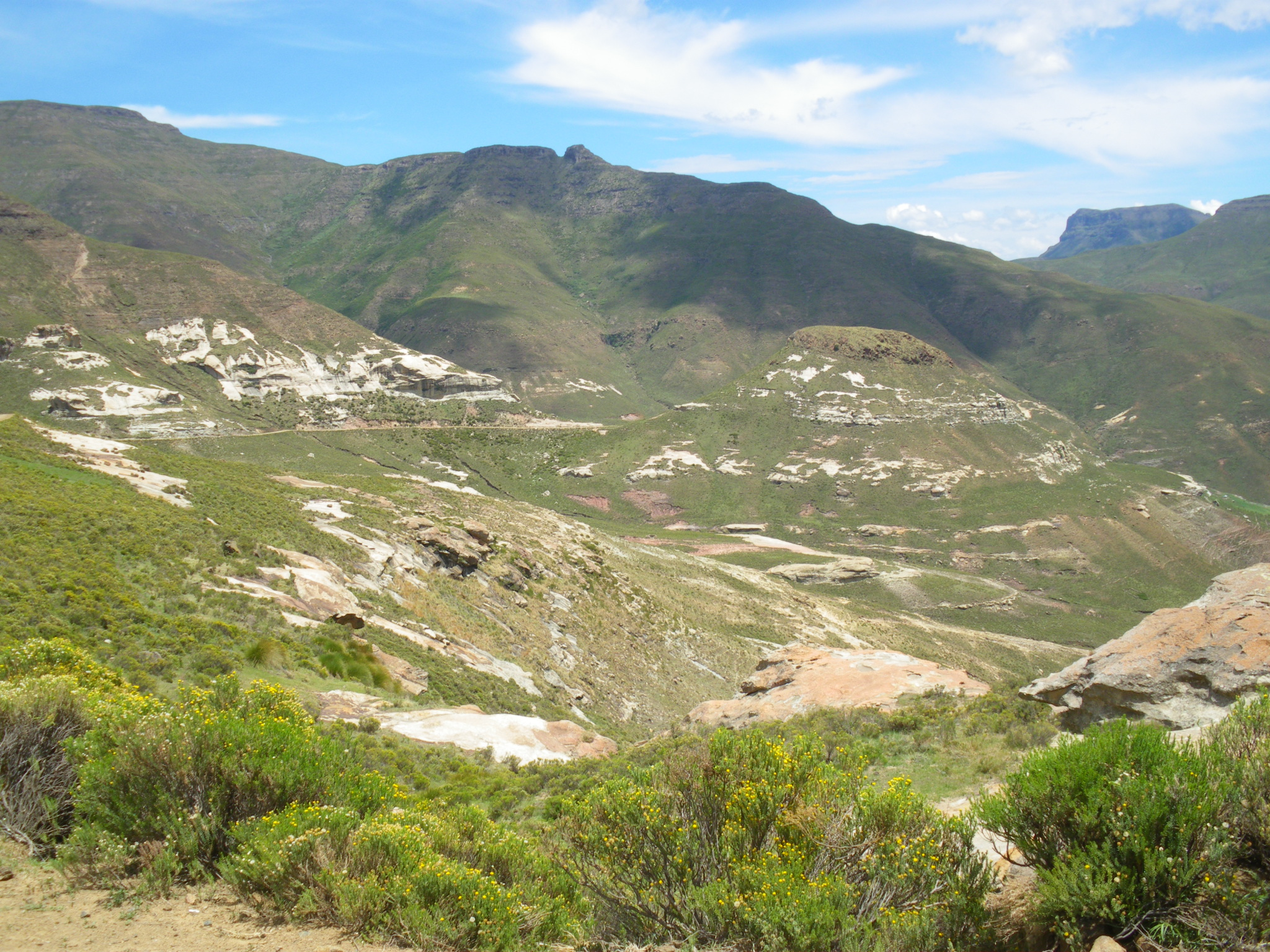
- Lundean's Nek

Highest point
- Listing: List of mountain ranges of South Africa
- Coordinates: 30°42′9″S 27°28′5″E

Geography
- Location within South Africa
- Country: South Africa
- Province: Eastern Cape

The Witteberg or Witteberge is a South African mountain range just off the south-west corner of Lesotho. The range, which rises to 2408 metres, stretches for about 60 km (37 mi) from Lundin's Neck in the east to Lady Grey in the west. The range lends its name to the Witteberg Series, the uppermost fossiliferous sequence of the Cape System of sedimentary rocks in South Africa.

The Witteberg Series (340-375 Ma) consists of clastic, shoreline deposits of shales, sandstones, and quartzites, and lies below the plant-bearing and glacial beds of the Lower Karoo System. The Witteberg Series has yielded fossil fragments of Lepidodendron-like plants and large numbers of the ichnogenus known as Spirophyton.

The upper part of the series is also rich in palaeoniscoid fauna. In 1969, Brian G. Gardiner PPLS, former professor of palaeontology at King's College, described 7 new genera and species of ray-finned fish from here – Australichthys longidorsalis, Aestuarichthys fulcratus, Willomorichthys striatulus, Sundayichthys elegantulus, Dwykia analensis, Adroichthys tuberculatus and Soetendalichthys cromptoni (=Aestuarichthys fulcratus). Two new families were also erected, the Willomorichthyidae and the Dwykiidae.

The Witteberge range in the Eastern Free State on the north-west corner of Lesotho is an unrelated mountain. 'Witteberg' (white mountain) is a common name in South Africa for any mountain lofty enough to show snowfall during winter.

== See also ==
- 4 Peaks Mountain Challenge
