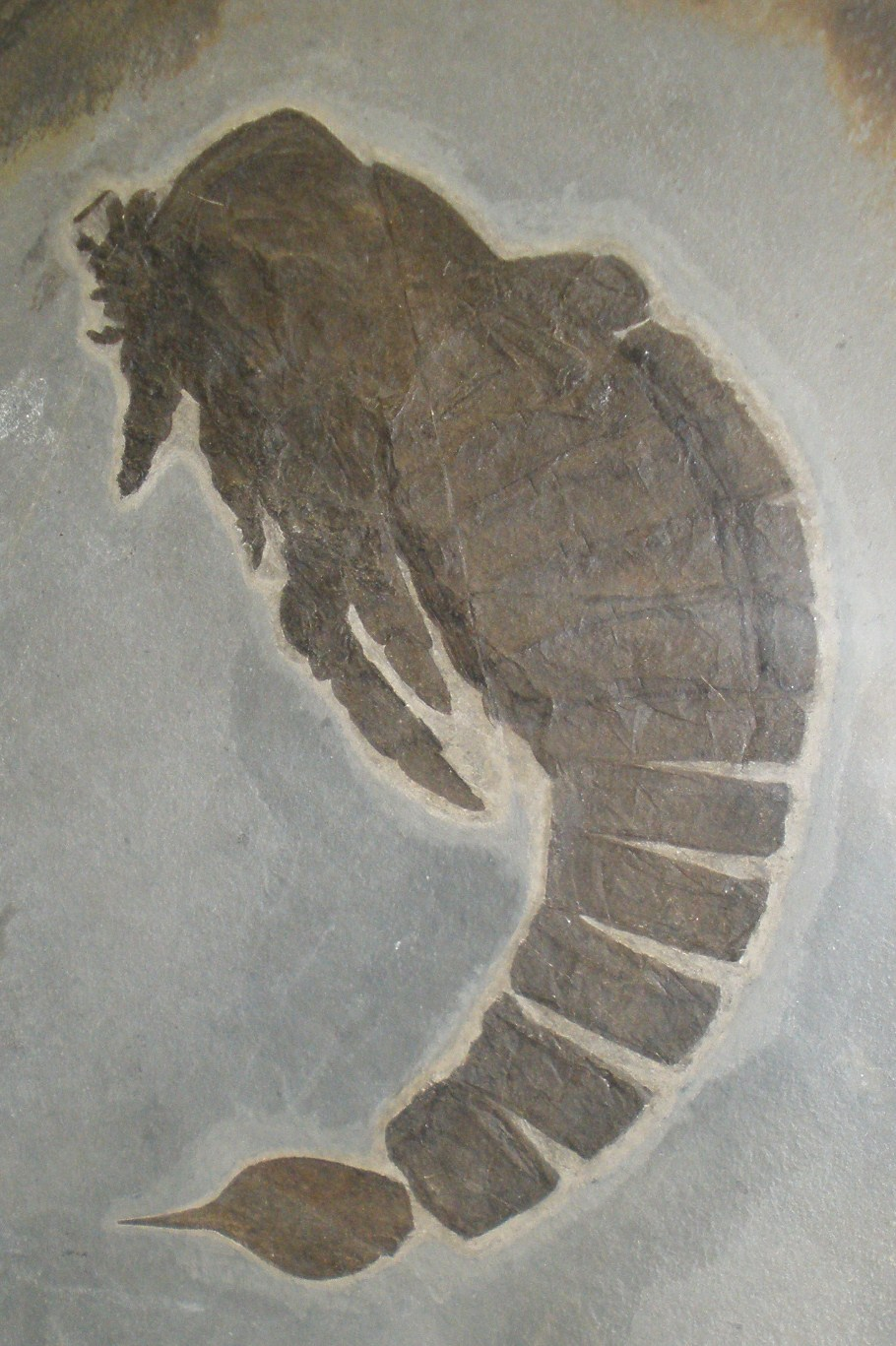
- Fossil of S. acuminata housed at the Senckenberg Museum of Frankfurt

Scientific classification
- Kingdom: Animalia
- Phylum: Arthropoda
- Subphylum: Chelicerata
- Order: †Eurypterida
- Superfamily: †Pterygotioidea
- Family: †Slimonidae
- Genus: †Slimonia; Page, 1856

Type species
- †Slimonia acuminata Salter, 1856

Species
- †S. acuminata Salter, 1856; †S. boliviana Kjellesvig-Waering, 1973; †S. dubia Laurie, 1899; †?S. stylops Salter, 1859

= Slimonia =

Slimonia Temporal range: Silurian, 436–420 Ma

Extinct genus of arthropods

Slimonia is a genus of eurypterid, an extinct group of aquatic arthropods. Fossils of Slimonia have been discovered in deposits of Silurian age in South America and Europe. Classified as part of the family Slimonidae alongside the related Salteropterus, the genus contains three valid species, S. acuminata from Lesmahagow, Scotland, S. boliviana from Cochabamba, Bolivia and S. dubia from the Pentland Hills of Scotland and one dubious species, S. stylops, from Herefordshire, England. The generic name is derived from and honors Robert Slimon, a fossil collector and surgeon from Lesmahagow.

Out of the four described species of Slimonia, three measured below or up to 20 centimetres (7.9 in) in length. Only S. acuminata was larger, with the largest specimens measuring 100 centimetres (39 in) in length. Though this is large for a predatory arthropod, Slimonia would be exceeded in length by later and more derived (more "advanced") members of the closely related pterygotid family of eurypterids, which would become the largest known arthropods to ever live.

== Description ==
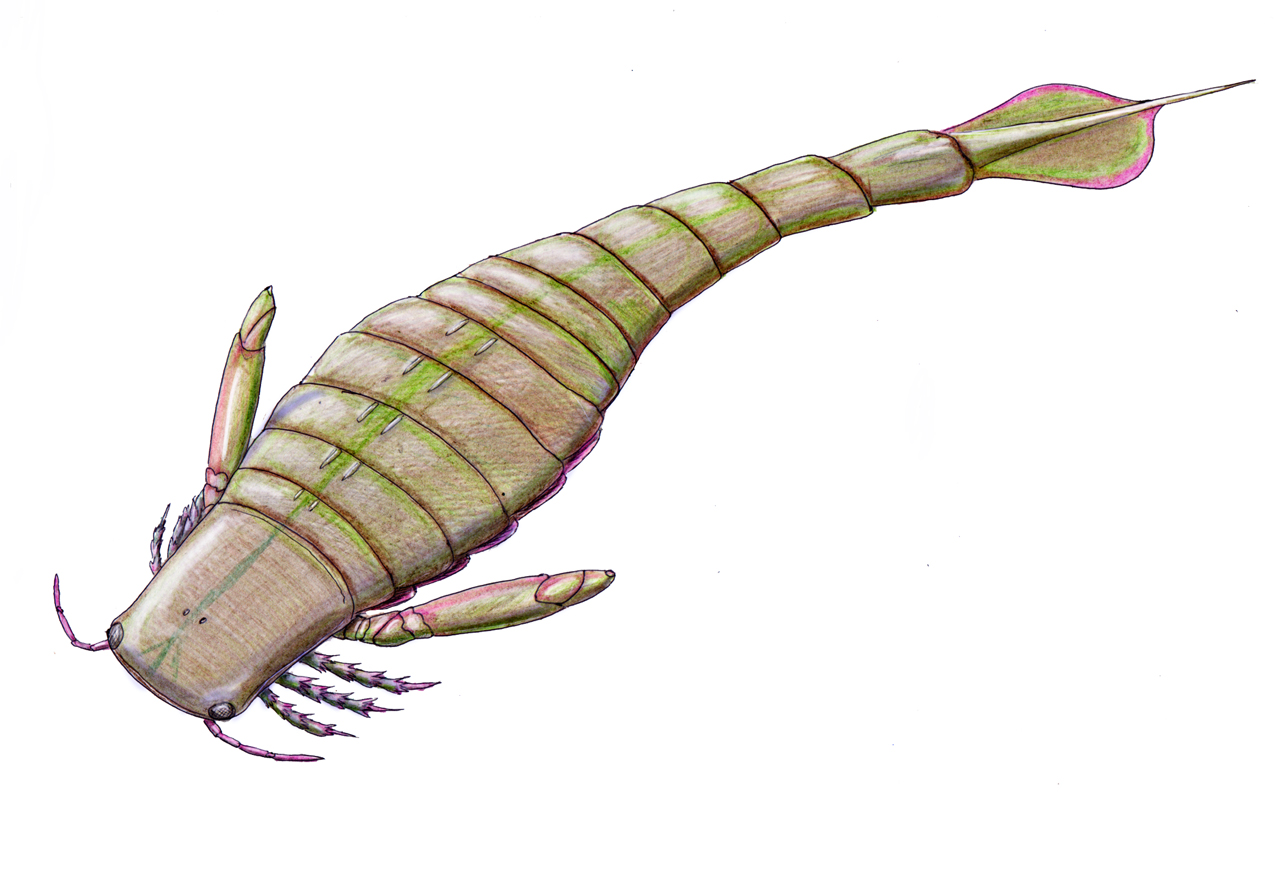
Life restoration of S. acuminata. The short chelicerae are hidden beneath the head.

Slimonia is in many ways similar to the more derived (more "advanced") eurypterids of its superfamily, the Pterygotioidea. In particular, the expanded and flattened telson (the most posterior segment of the body) of Slimonia is similar to that of the pterygotid eurypterids and is a feature that Slimonia and the pterygotids only share with some derived hibbertopterid eurypterids (where the feature convergently evolved). The pterygotid telson was in general slightly larger than that of Slimonia and was more slender. The telson spike of Slimonia was much longer than any seen in the Pterygotidae (constituting just over half of the total telson length) however, serrated and ending in a fine point. The largest species of Slimonia, S. acuminata, reached a maximum length of 100 cm (39 in) whilst the smallest, S. dubia, grew to 12 cm (5 in) in length. Though 100 cm is large for a predatory arthropod, Slimonia would be exceeded in length by later and more derived (more "advanced") members of the closely related pterygotid family of eurypterids, which would become the largest known arthropods to ever live.

Slimonia can be distinguished from other members of its family, the Slimonidae, by a variety of characteristics. The prosoma (head) is quadrate (square-shaped) in shape and had small compound eyes on the frontal corners. The bodies were large and cordate (heart-shaped), with a narrow postabdomen and a telson with a strongly expanded anterior half. The chelicerae (frontal appendages) were small in comparison to those of the pterygotids and the walking legs had denticles, but no spines. Genital appendages were long and narrow in both males and females.

== History of research ==
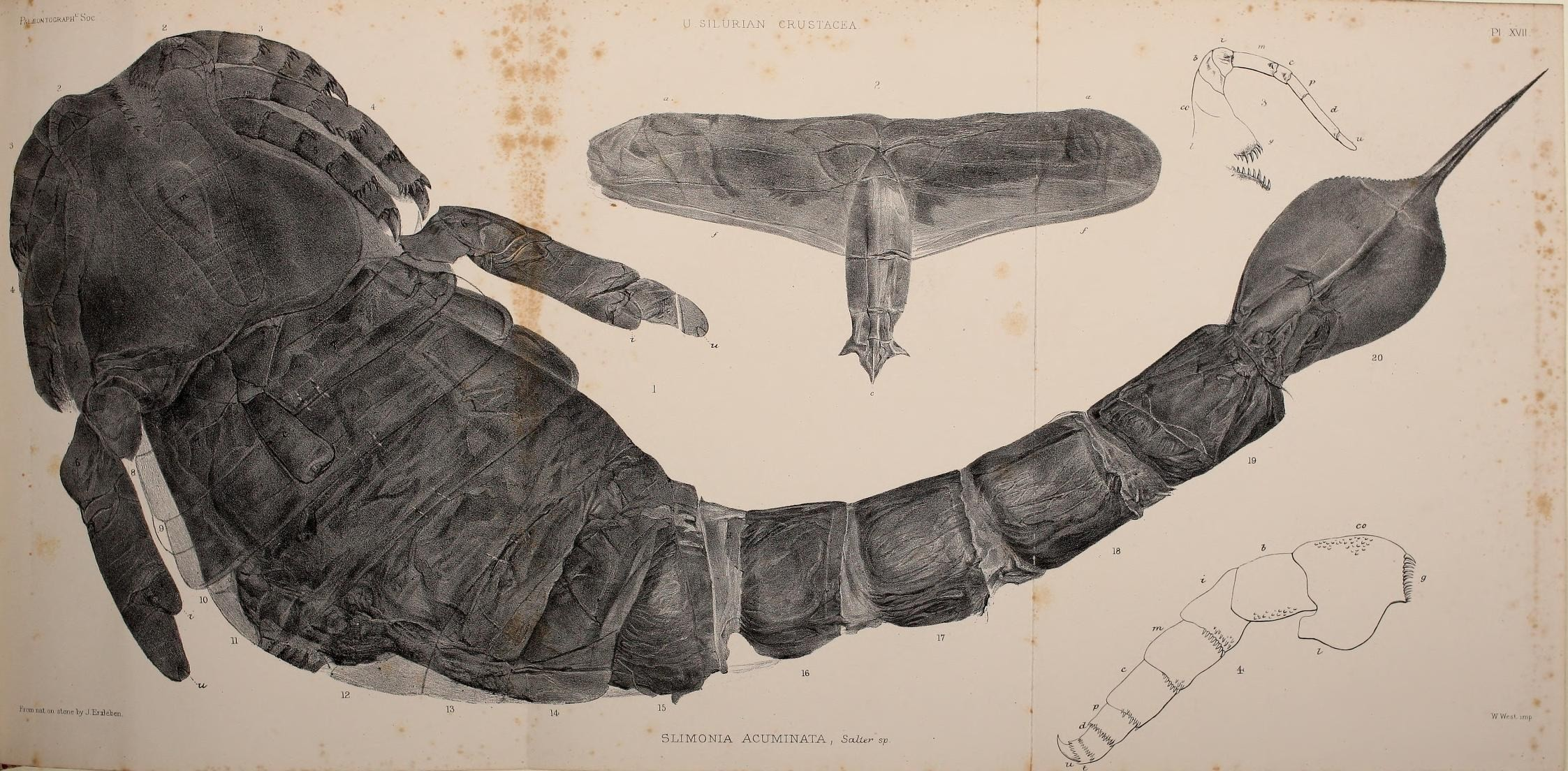
Fossil of S. acuminata

The type species of Slimonia, S. acuminata, was first described as a species of Pterygotus, "Pterygotus acuminata" (acuminata being Latin for "sharp" or "tapering"), by John William Salter in 1856, based on fossils recovered from deposits of Llandovery-Wenlock (Early to Middle Silurian) age in Lesmahagow, Scotland. That same year David Page erected a new genus to contain the species, as several distinctive characteristics made the species considerably different from other known species of Pterygotus, among them the shape of the carapace and S. acuminata lacking the large cheliceral claws known from Pterygotus. The generic name is derived from and honors Robert Slimon, a fossil collector and surgeon from Lesmahagow. Slimon was the first to discover eurypterid fossils in Lesmahagow, bringing them to the attention of Roderick Murchison in 1851. S. acuminata remains the largest known species, with the largest specimens measuring up to 100 cm (39 in) in length.

In 1899, an additional species, S. dubia, would be referred to the genus. This species was recovered from slightly earlier deposits (Llandovery age) in the Pentland Hills of Scotland and could be distinguished from S. acuminata by the more elongated telson (also not as broad in the parts furthest back), thinner telson spike and a slightly different, tapering, body shape that tapers evenly the whole way instead of suddenly narrowing near the seventh segment as in S. acuminata. The type specimen of S. dubia is a badly preserved carapace, with fragments of various degrees of completion of the first eleven segments found associated. Despite its fragmentary nature, the quadrangular (square) shape of the carapace and the eyes placed at its corners allowed zoologist and paleontologist Malcolm Laurie to place it within Slimonia when describing it in 1899. The size of the carapace suggests that the species would have grown to 12 cm (5 in) in length.

Another species, S. stylops, was first considered a species of Pterygotus when described by John William Salter in 1859, and the highly fragmentary nature of the known fossils make a precise identification difficult and problematic. Only one specimen, the anterior part of a carapace with the compound eyes placed on the margin, is known and though it does resemble Slimonia, it could also potentially be referred to Hughmilleria or even represent the carapace of Salteropterus abbreviatus (a closely related slimonid eurypterid known only from the telson and metastoma, a large plate part of the abdomen). The fossils were recovered from deposits of Pridoli (Late Silurian) age in Herefordshire, England and suggest that the species grew to 12 cm (5 in) in length. Due to its problematic nature, S. stylops is seen as a nomen dubium by modern researchers. In 2025, James Lamsdell noted that S. stylops could be a synonym of Salteropterus abbreviatus, but that no analysis was possible since the type specimen (and only known fossil) had been lost.

In 1973, another species of Slimonia was named by Kjellesvig-Waering based on one single fossil recovered by Eduardo Rodriguez from the Kirusillas Formation, of Ludlow-Pridoli (Late Silurian) age, in Cochabamba, Bolivia. Named S. boliviana, the holotype (BLV15, deposited at the National Museum of Natural History of France) comprises a well-preserved telson typical of the genus, being laterally inflated and with a dagger-like terminal point. It was anteriorly covered with small scales semilunar to mucronitic ("spined") grouped into a single row of large marginal scales that form a linear serrated edge. A slight dorsal keel is present along the telson. There was a triangular area at the base of the telson which could have been a point of union with the muscles. S. boliviana differed from S. acuminata in having the keel much less developed, narrower and not reaching the terminal spike. The latter was wider, not as pointed and with less developed serrations. The telson itself was wider and shorter than in the type species. This species was the third Silurian eurypterid in the Southern Hemisphere to be described, the other two coming from Australia. The fossil suggest a total body length of 20 centimetres (7.9 in).

== Classification ==
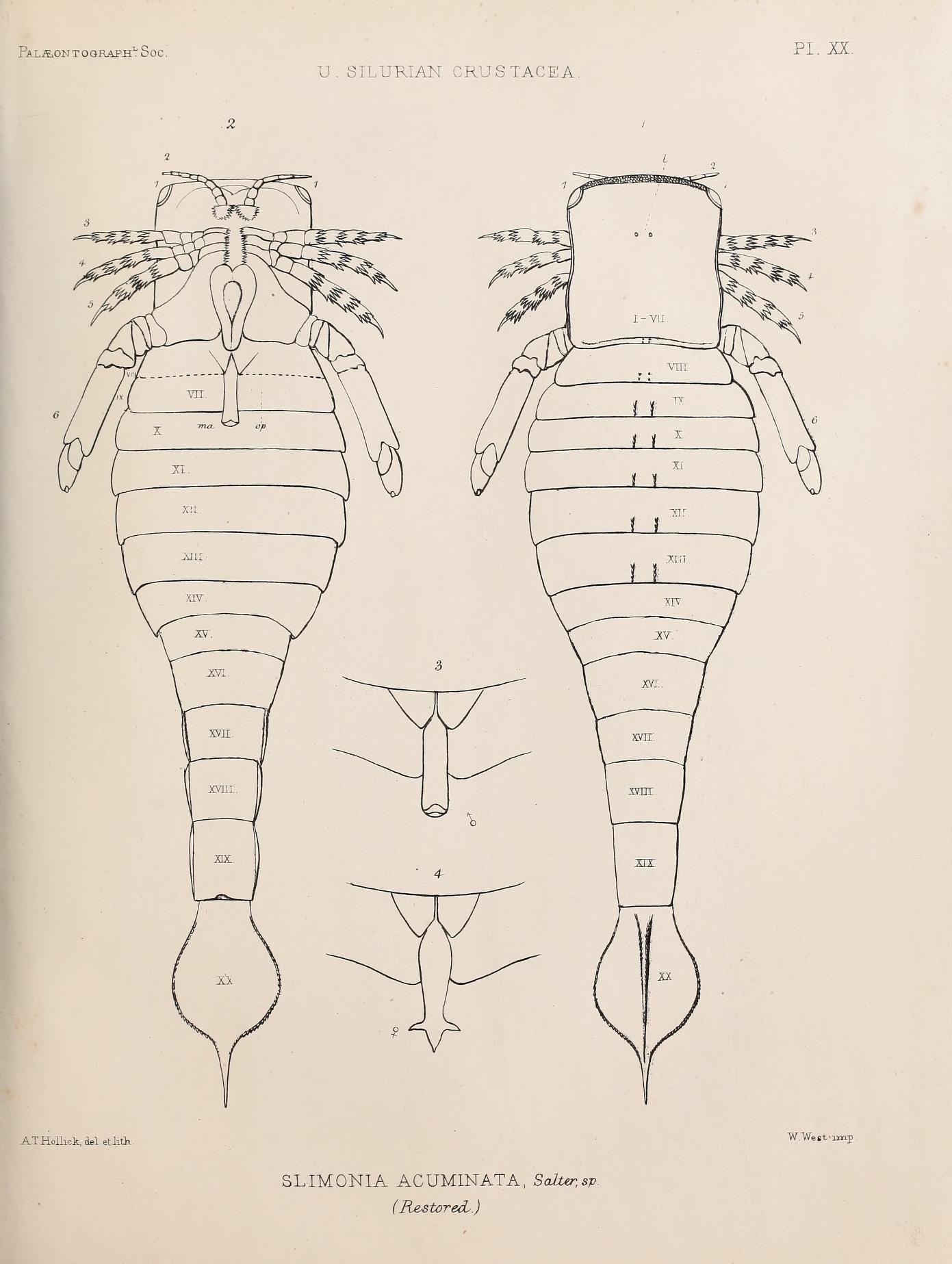
Ventral and dorsal views of S. acuminata. Note the ventral view is missing the short chelicerae that were actually present.

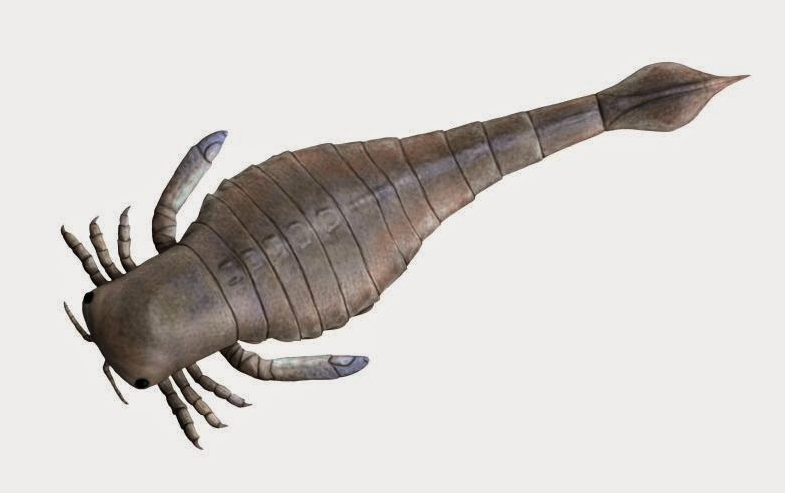
Life restoration of S. acuminata. Note the short chelicerae are hidden beneath the head.

Slimonia is classified as part of the eurypterid family Slimonidae, within the superfamily Pterygotioidea. Historically Slimonia was first considered a member of the Pterygotidae, until it was reclassified alongside Hughmilleria and other genera to the family Hughmilleriidae in 1951 by Erik N. Kjellesvig-Waering. Nestor Ivanovich Novojilov classified Slimonia as part of a family of its own in 1968.

Slimonia is one of the most closely related genera to the pterygotid family and the Slimonidae is often interpreted as a sister-taxon to the Pterygotidae. The other Pterygotioid family, the Hughmilleriidae, has also been interpreted as the most closely related sister-taxon to the pterygotids. The discovery of Ciurcopterus, the most primitive known pterygotid, and studies revealing that Ciurcopterus combines features of Slimonia (the appendages are particularly similar) and of more derived pterygotids, revealed that the Slimonidae is more closely related to the Pterygotidae than the Hughmilleriidae is.

The cladogram below is simplified from a study by O. Erik Tetlie (2007), and showcases the position of Slimonia relative to the rest of the Eurypterina suborder of eurypterids, with the Stylonurina suborder as an outgroup.

- Eurypterida
  - - Stylonurina
  - Eurypterina
    - Megalograptoidea
    - - Eurypteroidea
      - - Carcinosomatoidea
        - - Waeringopteroidea
          - - Adelophthalmoidea
            - Pterygotioidea
              - Hughmilleria
              - - Herefordopterus
                - - Slimonia
                  - - Pterygotidae

== Paleobiology ==
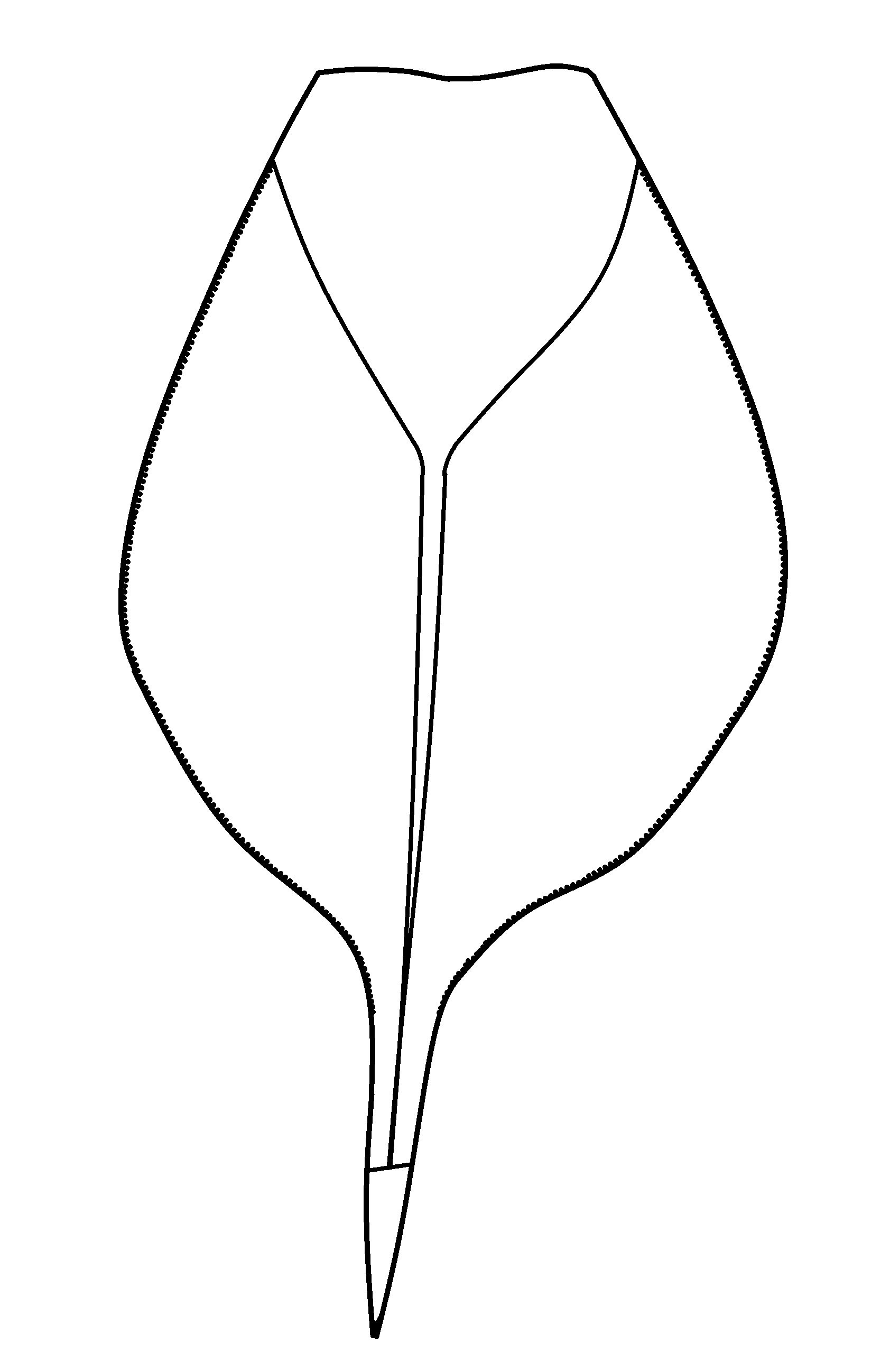
Drawing of the holotype of S. boliviana, a telson.

In 2017, W. Scott Persons IV and John Acorn reported finding an S. acuminata specimen, MB.A 863, in the Patrick Burn Formation of Scotland, dated to the Telychian, around 430 million years ago. The specimen was a complete and articulated series of telsonal, postabdominal and preabdominal segments, and it showed a very strong lateral curvature in the postabdomen. Persons and Acorn admitted that it might have experienced some disarticulation postmortem or could represent a partial molt (exuviae), but concluded that since there was no apparent disarticulation in the metasoma, it was likely that the articulation seen in the postabdominal segments (which is also seen in some other eurypterid fossils, such as of Eurypterus and Alkenopterus) would have been possible in life.

Biomechanical studies on the telsons and postabdominal segments of eurypterids closely related to Slimonia, particularly those of the family Pterygotidae, had revealed that the body was very stiff, and that the flattened telson would likely have served as a rudder that would have allowed the animals to be agile and capable of quick turns when chasing after prey, contradicting previous hypotheses that the telson would have served a propulsive function. Whilst the postabdomen of Slimonia was likely similarly stiff and inflexible dorsally (up and down), Persons and Acorn claimed that their specimen suggested that it was highly flexible laterally (side to side). As such, they theorised that the tail may have been used as a weapon. The telson spine, serrated along the sides and exceeding the flattened telson in length, ends in a sharp tip, and they proposed that it could have been capable of piercing prey.

However, the Persons and Acorn theory was challenged in 2018 by James Lamsdell, David Marshall, and Derek Briggs. Even though the Persons and Acorn study claimed that the fossil didn't show any signs of disarticulation, Lamsdell, Marshall, and Briggs showed this is likely not true. They argued that both tergite 8 and 10 clearly overlapped the other tergites in an unnatural way. Furthermore, they noted that the specimen was definitely a molt rather than a carcass, and argued that this meant that the pose the fossil was in did not represent a possible life position. They further argued that since the telson of Slimonia also possessed a keel, this would have created significant drag on it while Slimonia was trying to laterally sweep the telson to stab its prey. Lastly, they argued that the serrations on the telson would most likely be attachment points for setae that would have aided the animal in sensing the water flow to make steering much easier.

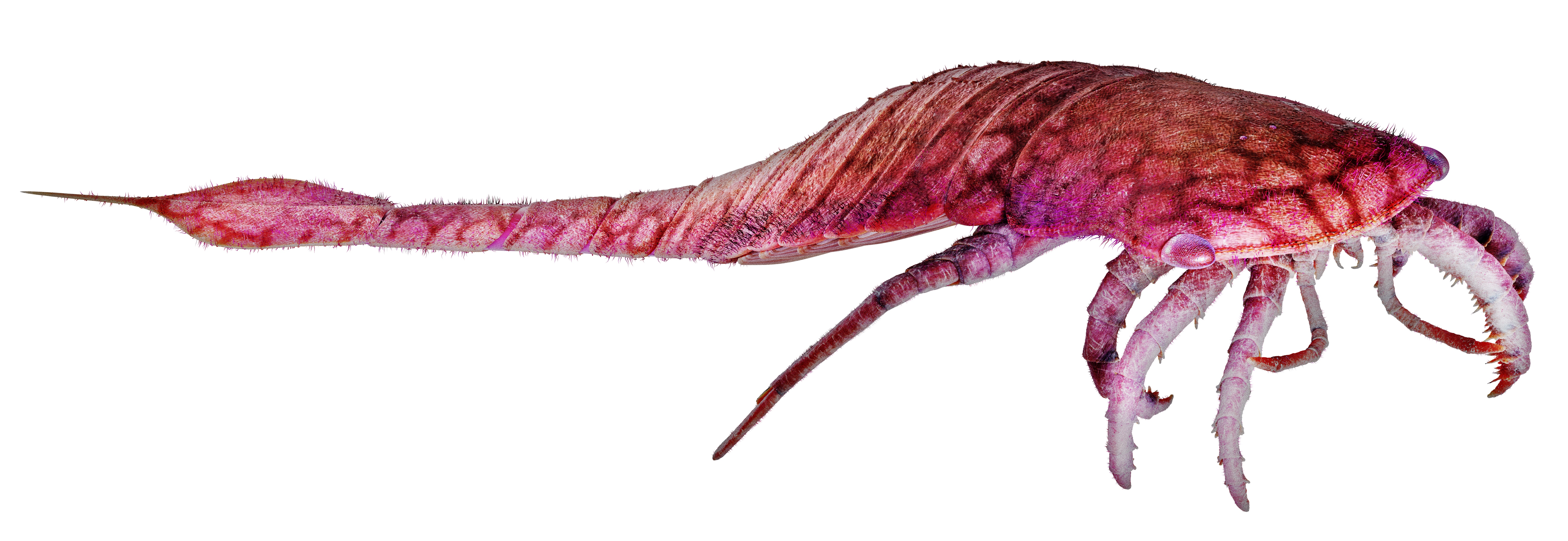
Reconstruction of Slimonia acuminata featuring short chelicerae below the head.

Visual acuity, the clarity of vision, can be determined in arthropods by determining number of lenses in their compound eyes and the interommatidial angle (shortened as IOA and referring to the angle between the optical axes of the adjacent lenses). The IOA is especially important as it can be used to distinguish different ecological roles in arthropods, being low in modern active arthropod predators. Slimonia was very similar to the basal pterygotid Erettopterus in terms of visual acuity, with the number of lenses being comparable to those of Pterygotus and Jaekelopterus and possessing an IOA between 2 and 3 (which is higher than the IOA of Pterygotus and Jaekelopterus, suggesting that the visual acuity of Slimonia was good, but not as good as in the derived pterygotids).

== Paleoecology ==
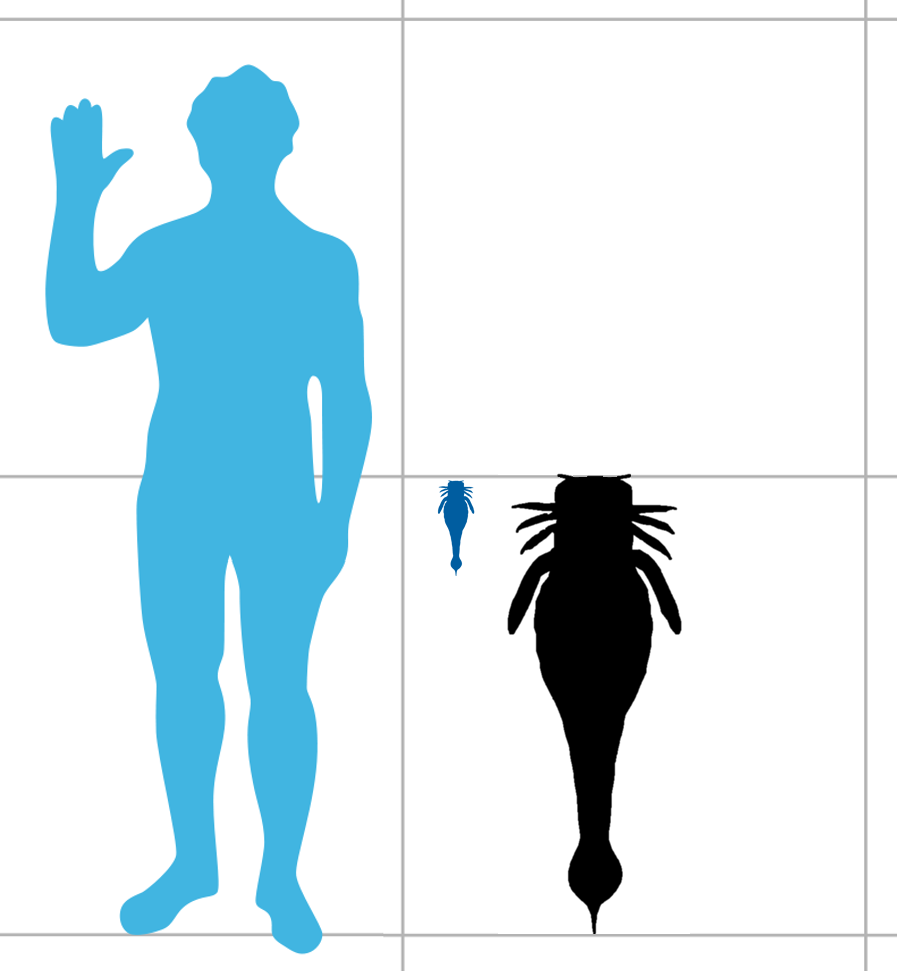
The size of the largest (S. acuminata) and smallest (S. dubia) species of Slimonia compared to a human.

Fossils of Slimonia have been recovered in deposits home to diverse eurypterid faunas. Telychian deposits in the Pentland Hills, where remains of S. dubia have been found, preserve fossils of a large amount of other eurypterids, including Drepanopterus pentlandicus, Laurieipterus elegans, Parastylonurus ornatus, Hardieopterus macrophthalmus, Carcinosoma scoticus, Stoermeropterus conicus and Pentlandopterus minor. Also preserved are fossils of orthocerids, such as Geisonoceras maclareni. Similar levels of eurypterid diversity are also observed in fossil deposits where other species of Slimonia have been found. S. acuminata has been found associated with Nanahughmilleria lanceolata, Hardieopterus lanarkensis, Eusarcana obesus, Parastylonurus sigmoidalis, Carcinosoma scorpionis and Erettopterus bilobus and S. stylops have been found associated with Nanahughmilleria pygmaea, Eusarcana salteri, Hardieopterus megalops, Erettopterus brodiei, E. gigas, Hughmilleria banksi, Eurypterus cephalaspis and Pterygotus ludensis.

The living environment of the pterygotids differed from genus to genus, with some (such as Pterygotus) being found in estuaries, while other (such as Jaekelopterus) were found in freshwater environments; Slimonia has been found in environments which appear to have been intertidal to marine, Patrick Burn Formation for example is estimated to be non-marine or marginal marine or just marine environment. Slimonia likely preyed on smaller fish, as it lacked the enlarged cheliceral claws of the pterygotids and was smaller in size than the largest members of that group. Prey likely included jawless fish such as heterostracans and early osteostracans, which Slimonia would have seized with its frontal appendages. Slimonia traversed its living environment on spindly legs or through using its swimming appendages. The lungs of the genus were located on the underside of the body in a series of folds.

Like many eurypterid species, Slimonia acuminata requires a modern re-description to properly establish defining traits and characteristics. Some traits that appear to be unique to S. acuminata have been described based on specimens housed at the Doncaster Museum and Art Gallery, including rows of pustules (bulges) along the marginal rim of the body and appendages. In some arthropods, pustules serve as attachment points of setae (bristle- or hair-like structures with sensory functions). Similar pustule rows have been discovered in the other eurypterid Drepanopterus abonensis, a sweep-feeder that used the marginal rim to search the substrate of its living environment for prey. If the pustules of S. acuminata had setae, these pustules may have functioned as tactile and sensory organs used for locating and identifying prey, together with the pedipalps (the gracile second pair of appendages, behind the chelicerae).

== See also ==
- List of eurypterid genera
- Timeline of eurypterid research
