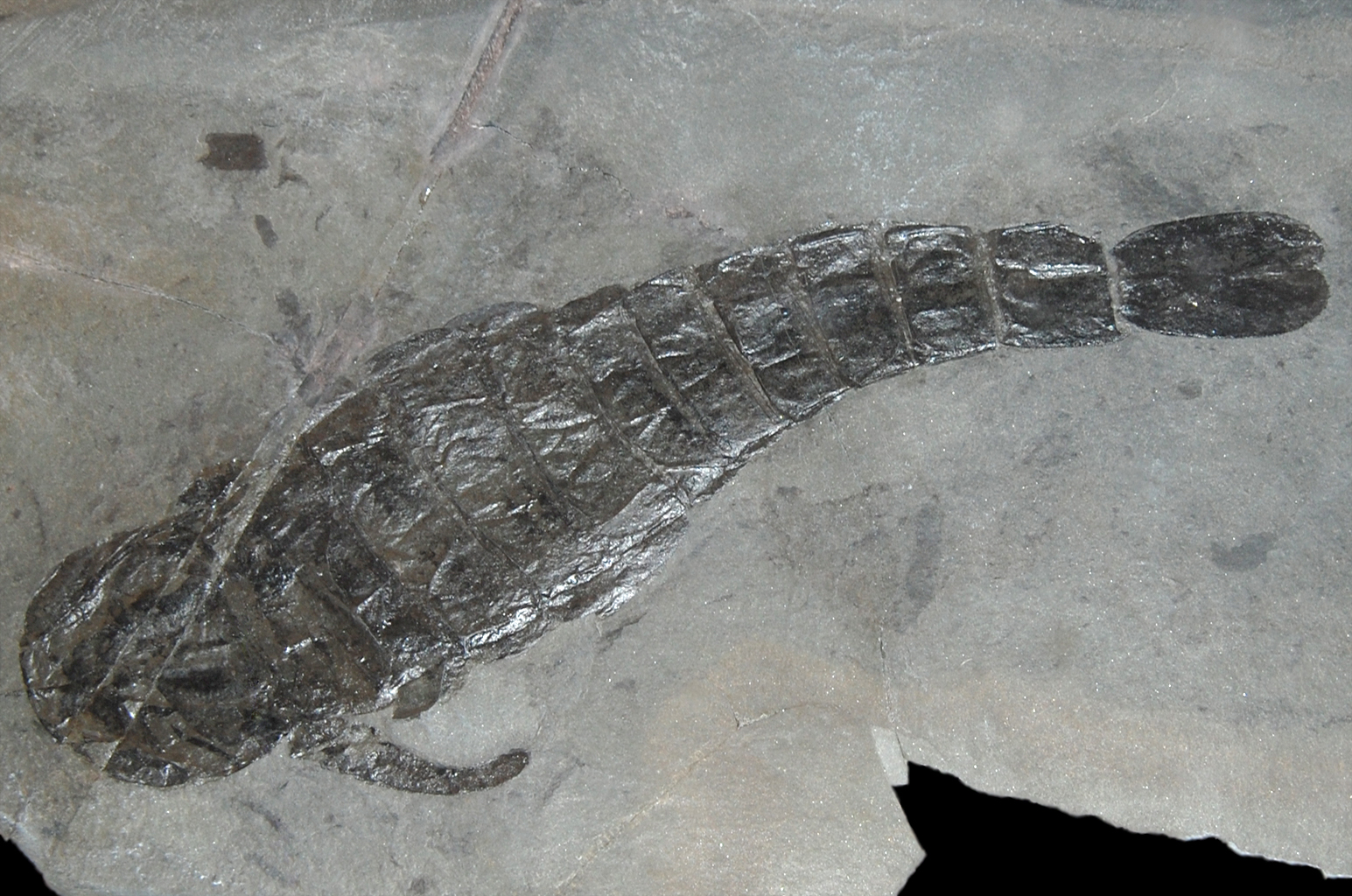
- Fossil of E. bilobus at the Natural History Museum, Vienna.

Scientific classification
- Kingdom: Animalia
- Phylum: Arthropoda
- Subphylum: Chelicerata
- Order: †Eurypterida
- Superfamily: †Pterygotioidea
- Family: †Pterygotidae
- Genus: †Erettopterus; Salter in Huxley & Salter, 1859

Type species
- †Erettopterus bilobus Salter, 1856

Species
- 17 species (Note: Lamsdell (2025) counts 18 species, but includes Necrogammarus salweyi, whose classification has long been disputed, as E. salweyi.): †E. bilobus Salter, 1856; †E. brodiei Kjellesvig-Waering, 1961; †E. canadensis Dawson, 1879; †E. exophthalmus Kjellesvig-Waering & Leutze, 1966; †E. gigas Salter in Huxley & Salter, 1859; †E. globiceps Clarke & Ruedemann, 1912; †E. grandis Pohlman, 1881; †E. holmi Størmer, 1934; †E. laticauda Schmidt, 1883; †E. marstoni Kjellesvig-Waering, 1961; †E. megalodon Kjellesvig-Waering, 1961; †E. osiliensis Schmidt, 1883; †E. qujingensis Ma et al., 2022; †E. serricaudatus Kjellesvig-Waering, 1979; †E. spatulatus Kjellesvig-Waering, 1961; †E. vogti Størmer, 1934; †E. waylandsmithi Kjellesvig-Waering & Caster, 1955

Synonyms
- Genus synonymy: Himantopterus Salter, 1856, preoccupied; ?Necrogammarus Woodward, 1870; Truncatiramus Kjellesvig-Waering, 1961; Synonyms of E. bilobus: Himantopterus perornatus Salter, 1856; Pterygotus bilobus var. acidens Woodward, 1869; Pterygotus bilobus var. crassus Woodward, 1869; Pterygotus bilobus var. inornatus Woodward, 1869; Pterygotus bilobus var. perornatus Woodward, 1869; Pterygotus lanarkensis Kjellesvig-Waering, 1964; Pterygotus perornatus var. plicatissimus Salter, 1859; Synonyms of E. osiliensis: Pterygotus impacatus Kjellesvig-Waering, 1964; Pterygotus monroensis Kjellesvig-Waering, 1964; Synonyms of E. serricaudatus: Erettopterus carinatus Kjellesvig-Waering, 1979

= Erettopterus =

Erettopterus Temporal range: Rhuddanian–Lochkovian 443.7–412.3 Ma

Extinct genus of arthropods

Erettopterus is a genus of large predatory eurypterid, an extinct group of aquatic arthropods. Fossils of Erettopterus have been discovered in deposits ranging from Early Silurian (the Rhuddanian age) to the Early Devonian (the Lochkovian age), and have been referred to several different species. Fossils have been recovered from three continents; Asia, Europe and North America. The genus name is composed by the Ancient Greek words ἐρέττω (eréttō), which means "rower", and πτερόν (pterón), which means "wing", and therefore, "rower wing".

Erettopterus is classified as part of the eurypterid family Pterygotidae, a family differentiated from other eurypterids by their flattened telsons (the most posterior segment of the body) and their modified chelicerae (frontal appendages), ending in well-developed chelae (claws). Although some pterygotid eurypterids, such as Jaekelopterus or Acutiramus grew to gigantic proportions, it is estimated that the largest species of Erettopterus, E. osiliensis, reached 90 cm (35 in). Fragmentary remains suggest much larger sizes, perhaps approaching the largest eurypterids. Erettopterus had a bilobed (divided into two lobes) telson, which is its main characteristic. The forms of chelicerae are very diverse between species, but they are generally very long with small curved teeth without serrations.

Studies on the chelicerae and compound eyes of Erettopterus have revealed that it was a predator with high visual acuity, but it was not as highly specialized or active as Jaekelopterus and Pterygotus, it was more like Slimonia acuminata, and probably used its enlarged chelicerae for grasping rather than a more specialized feeding.

== Description ==
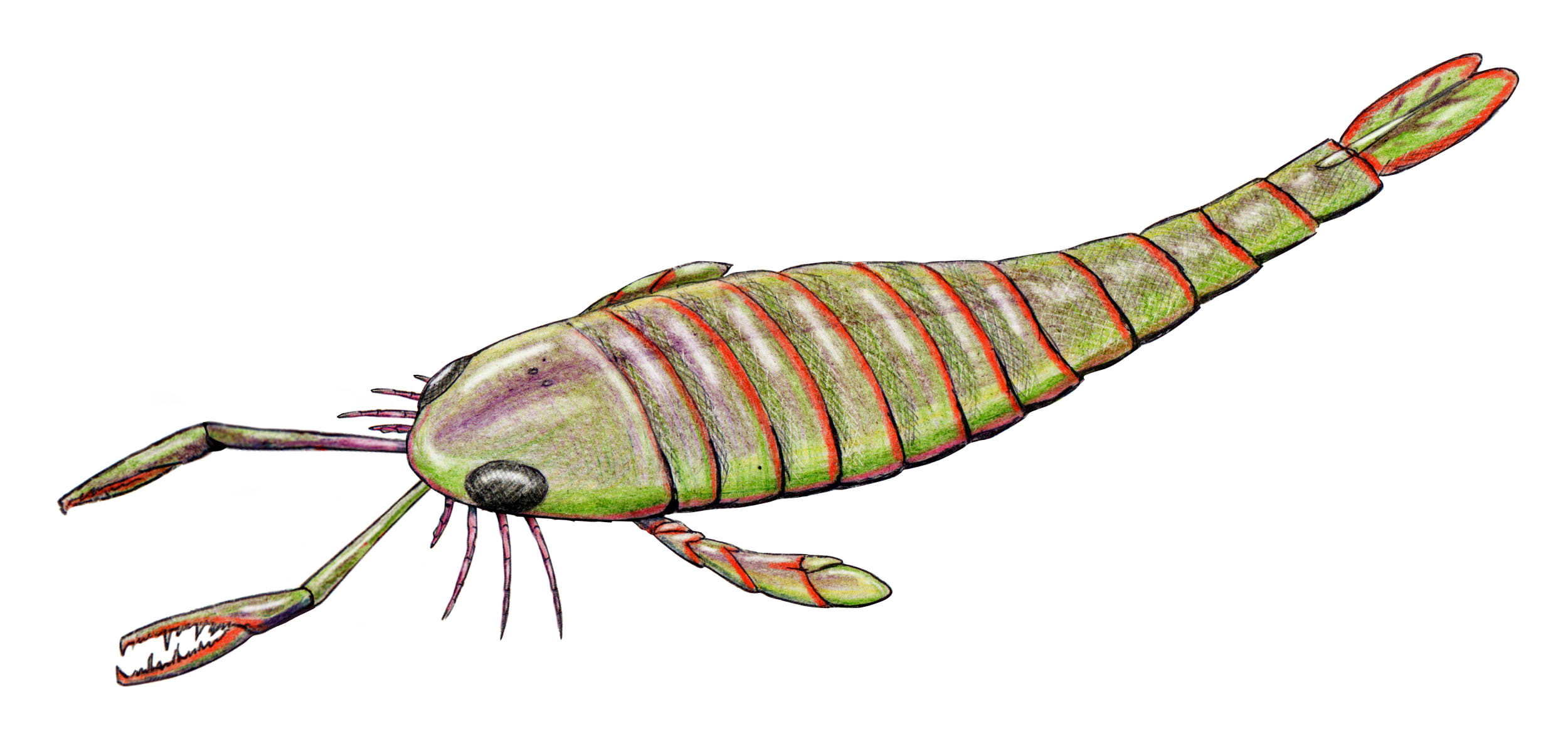
Restoration of E. osiliensis.

Erettopterus was a big eurypterid, with the largest well-preserved examples of E. osiliensis, the largest species, measuring approximately 90 cm (35 in) in length. Though this is large relative to most modern day arthropods, Erettopterus was small in comparison of many of the members of its family (the Pterygotidae), such as Jaekelopterus rhenaniae at 2.5 m (8 ft) (the largest known arthropod) and Acutiramus bohemicus at 2.1 m (7 ft).

Fragmentary remains assigned to Erettopterus suggest that the largest members of the genus may have approached the sizes seen in related genera. The fragmentary Pterygotus impacatus, synonymized with E. osiliensis in 2025, has been estimated to have reached a length of 1.65 metres (5.4 ft). E. grandis reached even larger sizes, 2.5 m (8 ft), but this size is indicated by an isolated incomplete telson (the most posterior segment of the body), therefore, it is not entirely confiable. The smallest species was E. globiceps, at only 9 cm (3.5 in), although the fossils of E. globiceps could be remains of juvenile specimens, which would mean that the species could have reached larger sizes.

The telson was expanded and bilobed (divided into two lobes). This form of telson is its main characteristic and differentiates it from the rest of the genera of the family Pterygotidae. Historically it was thought that Erettopterus had five joints in its chelicerae, but studies with complete specimens of Erettopterus and Acutiramus have revealed that the actual count appears to be four joints. The form of the chelicera within Erettopterus was very variable, but they were generally very long with small curved teeth without serrations. Its metastoma (a large plate that is part of the abdomen) was very narrow and cordated (heart-shaped) anteriorly deeply notched (V-shaped slit). The swimming legs were short. The body was elongate-oval in form and gradually attenuated into the abdomen. The compound eyes were broadly crescentic and convex, and as in the rest of the pterygotioids, they were located in the margin of the carapace.

== History of research ==
=== 19th century ===
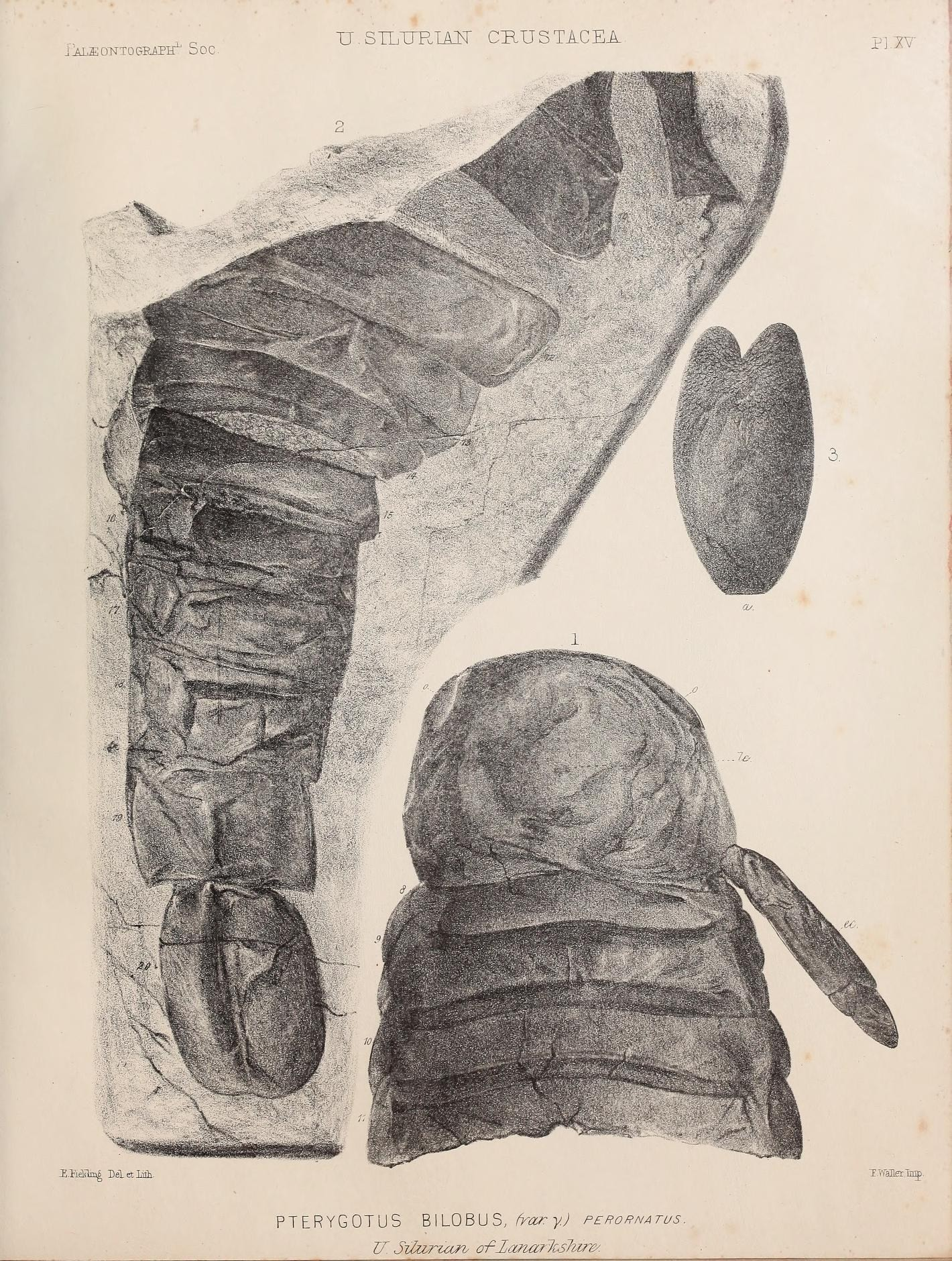
Illustration of fossils of E. bilobus.

A total of 19 valid species have been assigned to Erettopterus. Most of the species have been found in the United States or Great Britain, although fossils have also been found in Canada, Scandinavia and Estonia. The type species and the only species described in Scotland, E. bilobus, was first found in Lesmahagow, Scotland, and described by John William Salter in 1856 as a species of Himantopterus (a name that is a junior homonym of a moth genus), and Salter replaced the genus name with Erettopterus in 1859, although it would later be referred to as a species of Pterygotus. It is a very well known and very abundant species that since its original description has not received much attention, so it needs a redescription like other eurypterids to accommode a modern understanding of eurypterid systematics and evolution. The specific name bilobus refers to the bilobed telson of the species.

The English geologist Salter recognized in 1859 that it was possible to divide the genus Pterygotus based on the morphology of the telsons of the species that had been assigned to it. He divided Pterygotus into subgenera, including Pterygotus (Erettopterus) for species with a bilobed telson. The generic name is composed by the Ancient Greek words ἐρέττω (eréttō, rower) and πτερόν (pterón, wing), which is translated as "rower wing". At the same time, the first English species of Erettopterus, E. gigas, was described by Salter and Thomas Henry Huxley. It is known for multiple poorly conserved specimens discovered in deposits of the Přídolí (Late Silurian) age. The specific epithet gigas emphasizes the large size that its fossils indicated (although the current estimated size is 25 cm (10 in)). When another species of England from the Late Ludlow (Late Silurian) age was described in 1961 by Erik N. Kjellesvig-Waering as E. megalodon, the various similarities among the species were discovered, including the possession of a central tooth of the fixed ramus (the external branch of the appendage). In both species, the central tooth is serrated along the inner edge and is followed by irregularly sized teeth. However, those of E. megalodon are more spine-like and longer than those of E. gigas, which is the reason why it was assigned this specific name. All these characteristics indicate a close relationship between both species.

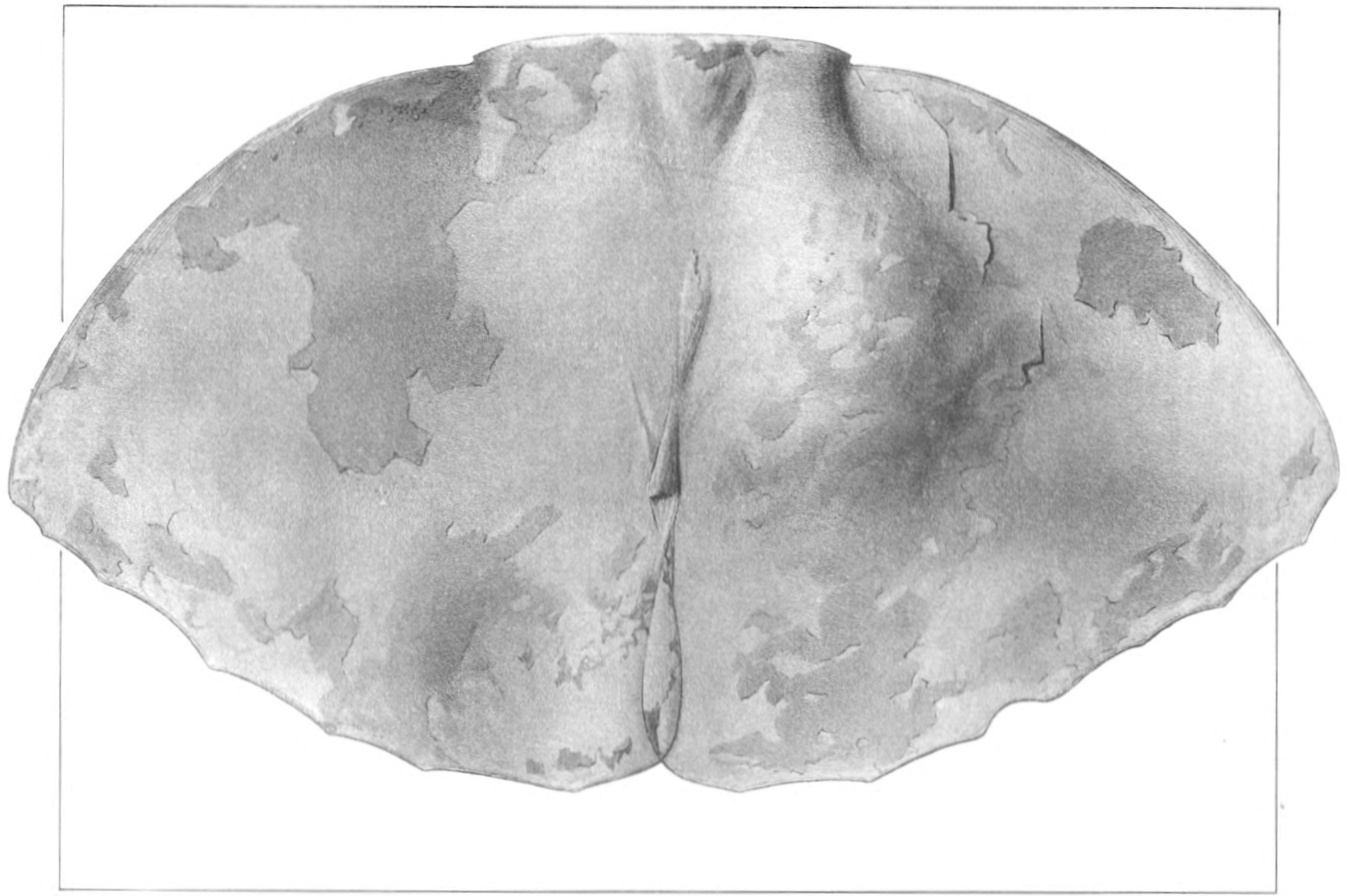
Holotype of E. grandis, a telson.

Next, two species in North America would be described. One of them was the Canadian E. canadensis (referring to the country where it was discovered) described by John William Dawson from the Late Wenlock (Late Silurian) age, known for a well-preserved ectognath (maxilliped, an appendage used in the alimentation) found in a slab of Niagara limestone. This ectognath of 8.8 cm (3.5 in) in length has a narrow maxillary process with approximately 15 denticles (tooth serrations), including one, the posterior denticle, which is broad and slightly notched in front. The other was E. grandis (grandis because of the large size of the species) from the Přídolí age of the United States described by Julius Pohlman. This species was originally described as the carapace (the exoskeleton segment covering the head) of a gigantic Ceratiocaris (an extinct genus of phyllocarid from the Silurian), but it has been shown that the specimen represents the bilobed section of the telson (the most posterior segment of the body) of an Erettopterus. This incomplete telson indicates that the animal reached a size of 2.5 m (8 ft), but this is not entirely reliable.

In 1883, one more species was described by Carl Friedrich Schmidt from the Ludlow age in Estonia, E. osiliensis. It was described from a large series of fossils found in Saaremaa, Estonia. In this species, the carapace was semi-oval with large oval eyes in the margin, while the ocelli (light-sensitive simple eyes) were slightly behind half the length of the carapace. The metastoma was broad, heart-shaped, narrow towards the back and truncated at the end. The rami end in a well-developed sharp and triangular point. E. laticauda was first described as a variety of E. osiliensis by the same author, but due to telson and metastoma differences, it was elevated to the species range. The telson of E. laticauda is very rounded, wide and without any serrations along the posterior part, unlike E. osiliensis. In addition, the metastoma was more oval than in E. osiliensis.

=== 20th–21st centuries ===
In the 20th century, several species were described in Europe and the United States, extending the range of Erettopterus. In 1912, E. globiceps (globiceps being Latin for "ball-" or "sphere-headed") from the Llandovery (Early Silurian) age in the United States was described by John Mason Clarke and Rudolf Ruedemann. It is so far the smallest species of Erettopterus with only a length of 9 cm (3.5 in). The fossils of E. globiceps are rare and have been found in the Otisville fauna in the Shawangunk grit. The compound eyes are very large, occupying half the length of the carapace. This suggests that E. globiceps could reach larger sizes and that the specimens found represent juveniles in growth stage, and other specimens indicate the same. The Norwegian E. vogti (honoring Thorolf Vogt, leader of the expeditions from 1925 to 1928 to Spitsbergen) from the Lochkovian age and E. holmi from the Late Wenlock age were described in 1934 by Leif Størmer.

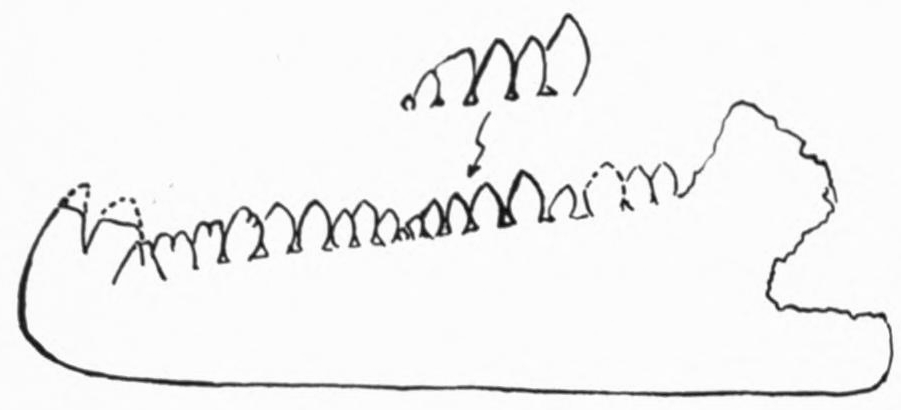
Holotype of E. serratus, a ramus of chelicera.

In 1961, Kjellesvig-Waering raised Erettopterus to the level of its own genus, recognizing two subgenera of Pterygotus; P. (Pterygotus) and P. (Acutiramus), as well as two subgenera of Erettopterus; E. (Erettopterus) and E. (Truncatiramus). Additionally, he described four new English species, E. marstoni, E. spatulatus, E. megalodon and E. brodiei. E. marstoni (honoring Alfred Marston, responsible for several collections of fishes and eurypterids) is based on incomplete specimens, which together represent an almost complete chelicera. The holotype (BMNH 43790, in the British Museum of Natural History) consists of a free ramus, and the paratype (BMNH 43805, in the same museum as the holotype) includes most of the fixed ramus, that is very slender and tapering to the curved distal end. A large tooth is present in the midsection of the ramus. The end of the ramus is broken, but probably ended in a double tooth. This feature is also present in E. brodiei, only known from one specimen (FMNH 89411, located in the Field Museum of Natural History) which consists of an uncrushed chela. Its specific name honors Peter Bellinger Brodie, whose collections of eurypterids have helped the scientific community. E. spatulatus is remarkable by its shovel-or fan-shaped telson, which is wider than long and gives it the specific name. These telsons are rare, and have only been seen in E. grandis. In the same year, he described an American species, E. serratus (Latin for "serrated"), from the Lower Devonian age in Ohio. This species is based on a complete and well-preserved free ramus (FMNH 5104, in the Field Museum of Natural History). This species differs from the others by its thick chela and the aforementioned short and robust teeth. E. serratus was designated a junior synonym of Pterygotus carmani in 2025. In 1964, Kjellesvig-Waering described E. saetiger from the Silurian age in Pennsylvania was described. The holotype (FMNH 157, housed at the Field Museum of Natural History) consists of an unusually well preserved metastoma. The metastoma has been defined as roughly ellipsoidal, truncated posteriorly and not excessively cordate at the anterior margin. E. saetiger was reclassified as a species of Hughmilleria in 2025, since the metastoma agrees only with the condition in Hughmilleria, and differs from other species attributed to Erettopterus.

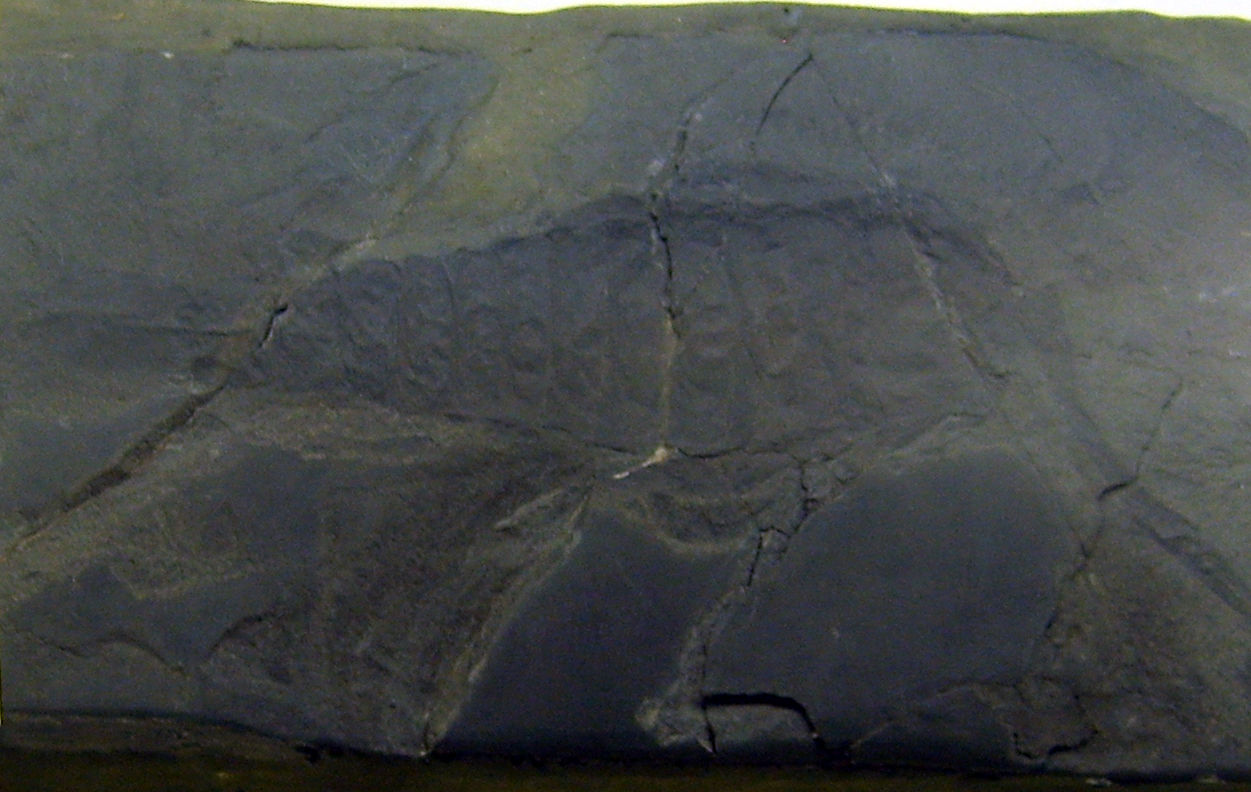
Fossilized specimen of E. bilobus at the Natural History Museum, Berlin.

In 1966, another species would be included in the genus by Kjellesvig-Waering and Willard P. Leutze based on one chelicera, which is the holotype, two prosomas (head) and one metastoma. This species has been described as E. exophthalmus, from the Ludlow-Přídolí age in West Virginia. The prosoma is very long, with anterolateral compound eyes that are prominent, protuberant and elliptical. The chelicera is composed of a well preserved free ramus which retains a double tooth socket. Both terminal teeth are wide and short, although one is longer than the other. A fine ribbing ("striations") is visible in both teeth, but not in the others. These other teeth are generally small, curved and of irregular sizes. The metastoma is cordated anteriorly and narrowing to a rounded posterior.

In 1971, E. serricaudatus and E. carinatus from the Early Wenlock age in Sweden were described by Kjellesvig-Waering. They were the only pterygotids in the area. The holotype of E. serricaudatus consists of the fixed ramus with acute termination of a large chelicera. This species is remarkable due to the group of diagonal opposing teeth of the ramus. This species differs from E. osiliensis (species in which E. serricaudatus was erroneously included) by its outwardly bowed rami, unlike the straight rami of E. serricaudatus. In addition, the shape and grouping of the teeth are completely different between them. The holotype of E. carinatus is the fragment of the base of a telson that measures 20 mm (0.8 in) in length and 13 mm (0.5 in) in width that indicates that the complete telson measured 40 mm (1.6 in) of estimated length, 20 mm (0.8 in) of maximum width. This species differs from others in having narrow lateral lobes, in having coarse striations on the cordated area and in its carinated (keel-like) telson, which is what gives the specific name. In 2025, E. carinatus was designated a junior synonym of E. serricaudatus.

In 1974, Størmer raised Acutiramus and Truncatiramus to the level of separate genera. The differences between Erettopterus and Truncatiramus were in the chelicerae, which were longer in Erettopterus than in Truncatiramus. In Erettopterus, the teeth were curved and small, while in Truncatiramus they were irregular in size and could be curved, straight or rhombic. However, it has been questioned whether chelicerae serve as a factor for the distinction between genera since their morphology is dependent on lifestyle and vary throughout ontogeny (the formation and individual development of an organism), although they could be acceptable for the differentiation between species. Therefore, Truncatiramus was later recognized as representing a synonym of Erettopterus.

In addition, Pterygotus waylandsmithi was transferred to Erettopterus in 2007 based on similarities of the chelicerae with E. osiliensis. Pterygotus monroensis was considered synonymous with E. osiliensis, extending the range of the species to the United States.

In 2023, the new species Erettopterus qujingensis was described, from the upper Silurian (Pridolian) Yulongsi Formation of Yunnan Province, China.

== Classification ==
The size of the smallest (E. globiceps) and largest confirmed (E. osiliensis, ignoring fragmentary remains) species of Erettopterus, as well as the potentially gigantic E. grandis, compared to a human.

Erettopterus is classified as part of the pterygotid family of eurypterids, a group of highly derived (with evolutionary novelties) eurypterids of the Silurian to Devonian periods that differ from other groups by a number of features, perhaps most prominently in the chelicerae and the telson. The chelicerae of the Pterygotidae were enlarged and robust, clearly used to hunt. Their walking legs were small and slender, without spines, and they were likely not capable of walking on land.

What sets Erettopterus apart from the other pterygotids is the morphology of its bilobed telson, which is different from the telson of Ciurcopterus, with a dorsal median carinae, and that of Pterygotus, Jaekelopterus and Acutiramus, which form a short spine.

The cladogram below published by Braddy et al. (2007) is based on the nine best-known pterygotid species and two outgroup taxa (used as a reference group), Slimonia acuminata and Hughmilleria socialis. The cladogram also contains the maximum sizes reached by the species in question, which have been suggested to possibly have been an evolutionary trait of the group per Cope's rule ("phyletic gigantism").

- Pterygotioidea
  - Hughmilleria socialis (20 cm, 8 in)
  - - Slimonia acuminata (100 cm, 39 in)
    - - - Ciurcopterus ventricosus (70 cm, 28 in)
        - Pterygotidae
          - - Erettopterus waylandsmithi (60 cm, 24 in)
            - Erettopterus osiliensis (90 cm, 35 in)
            - - Erettopterus serricaudatus (60 cm, 24 in)
              - Erettopterus bilobus (70 cm, 27 in)
          - - Pterygotus anglicus (160 cm, 63 in)
            - - Jaekelopterus rhenaniae (250 cm, 98 in)
              - - Acutiramus macrophthalmus (200 cm, 79 in)
                - Acutiramus bohemicus (210 cm, 83 in)

== Paleoecology ==
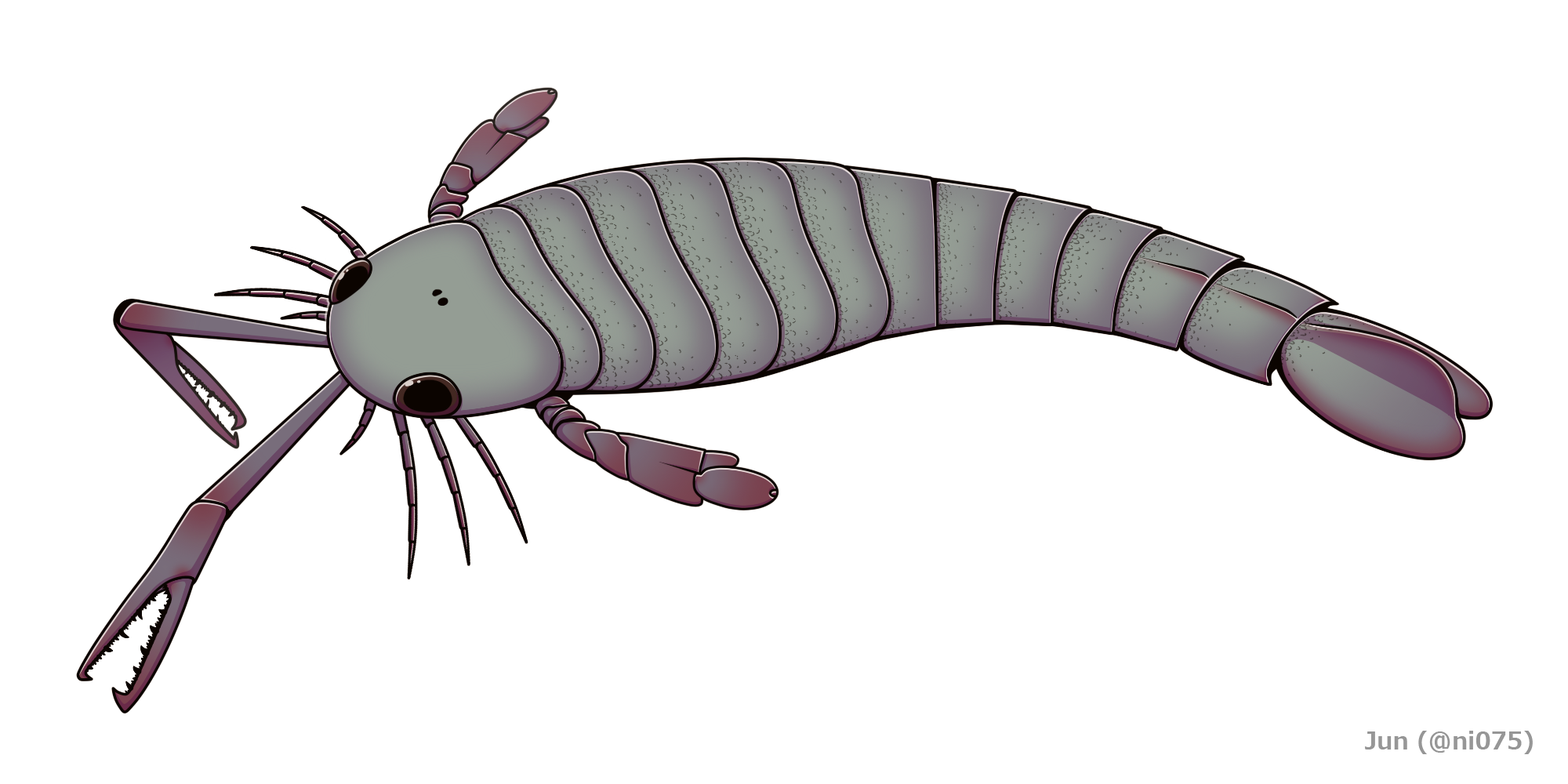
Restoration of E. bilobus.

The chelicerae of the pterygotids were clearly adapted to be used for active prey capture and more similar to the claws of some modern crustaceans, with well developed teeth on the claws, than to the chelicerae of other eurypterid groups. Another feature distinguishing the group from other eurypterid groups were their flattened and expanded telsons, likely used as rudders when swimming.

The cheliceral morphology and visual acuity of the pterygotid eurypterids separates them into distinct ecological groups. The primary method for determining visual acuity in arthropods is by determining the number of lenses in their compound eyes and the interommatidial angle (shortened as IOA and referring to the angle between the optical axes of the adjacent lenses). The IOA is especially important as it can be used to distinguish different ecological roles in arthropods, being low in modern active arthropod predators.

The vision of Erettopterus was similar to that of the more basal pterygotoid Slimonia and more acute than the more derived Acutiramus though was not as acute as the vision of apex predators Jaekelopterus and Pterygotus or modern active predatory arthropods. Additionally, the large chelicerae of Erettopterus suggest that it was a generalized feeder and not a highly specialized predator and that it used its chelicerae (frontal appendages) to grasp. The teeth on the chelae fingers of Erettopterus were mostly short and suitable for holding prey, and could have effectively sliced up the prey.

The number of lenses in the compound eyes of Erettopterus is comparable to the number in Pterygotus and Jaekelopterus which suggests that while undoubtedly predatory, Erettopterus was not as active, nor as specialized, as these genera.

Erettopterus has been found in North America and in Europe. The Llandovery-aged deposits of the Kip Burn and Patrick Burn formations in Lesmahagow, where the first fossils of E. bilobus were found, preserve fossils of a large amount of other eurypterids, including Nanahughmilleria lanceolata, Hardieopterus lanarkensis, Eusarcana obesus, Parastylonurus sigmoidalis, Carcinosoma scorpionis and Slimonia acuminata. Other organisms found in the zone include the gastropod Euomphalopterus, the hyperoartid Jamoytius or the thelodontid Logania. The deposits of the Rootsikula Formation in Saaremaa in which fossils of E. laticauda and E. osiliensis have been found shelter various faunas of eurypterids such as Mixopterus simonsi, Strobilopterus laticeps and Eysyslopterus patteni. Fossil remains of indeterminate osteostracids and thelodontids have also been found. Other fossils have also been found in different places, such as Great Britain, Canada, Scandinavia and the United States.

== See also ==
- List of eurypterid genera
- Timeline of eurypterid research
- Pterygotidae
- Pterygotus
