= John William Salter =

English naturalist, geologist, and palaeontologist (1820–1869)

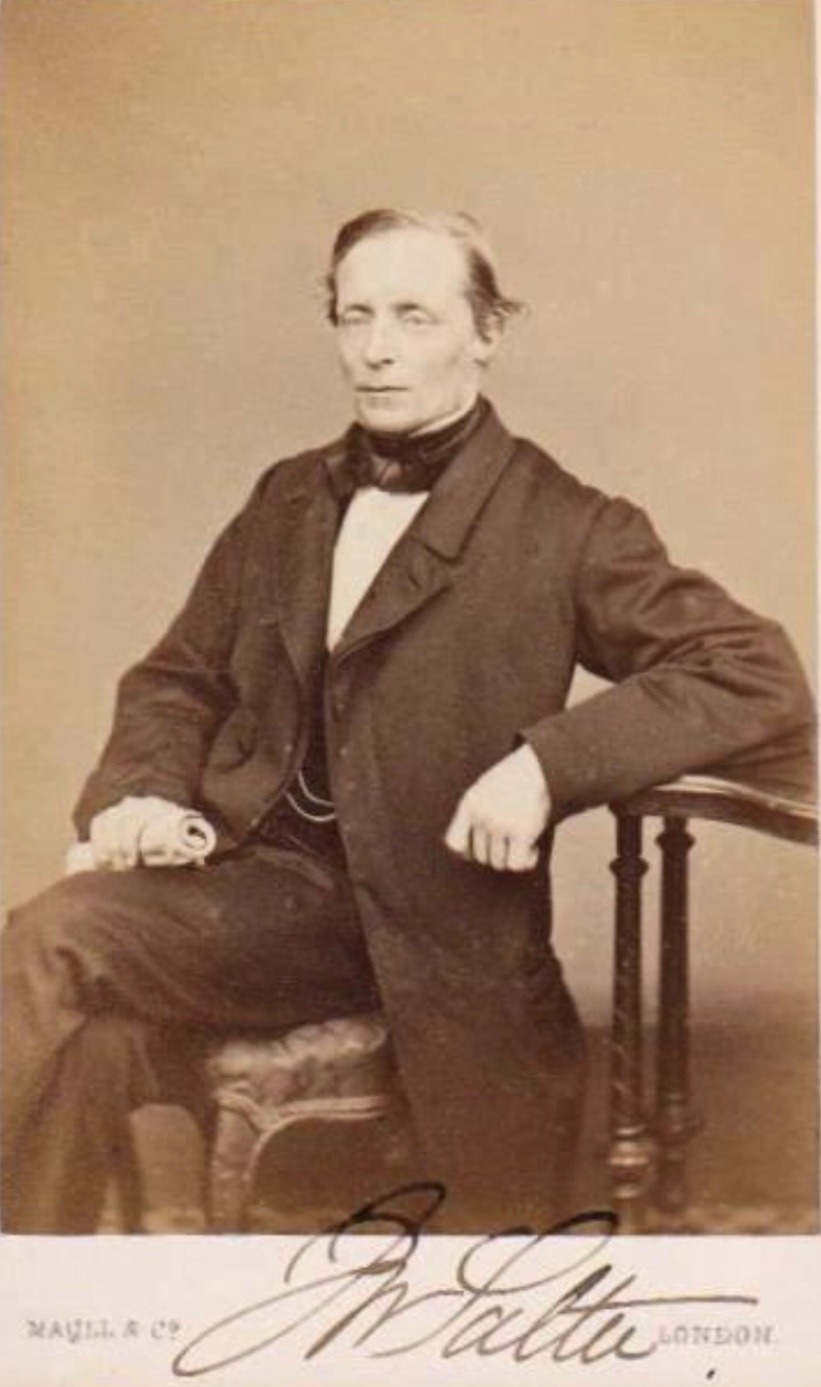
JOHN WILLIAM SALTER (1820–1869), English naturalist and palaeontologist.

John William Salter FGS (15 December 1820 – 2 December 1869) was an English naturalist, geologist, and palaeontologist.

Salter was apprenticed in 1835 to James De Carle Sowerby, and was engaged in drawing and engraving the plates for Sowerby's Mineral Conchology, the Supplement to Sowerby's English Botany, and other natural history works. In 1842, he was employed for a short time by Adam Sedgwick in arranging the fossils in the Woodwardian Museum at Cambridge, and he accompanied the professor on several geological expeditions (1842–1845) into Wales.

Salter was born in Pratt Place, Camden Town, the son of John Salter (1779–1837), a banking clerk, and his wife, Mary Ann. His birth was registered at Dr. William's Library near Cripplegate, London. In 1846, Salter married Sally, daughter of James De Carle Sowerby, and eventually fathered seven children with her. Also in 1846, Salter was appointed on the staff of the Geological Survey and worked under Edward Forbes until 1854. He succeeded Forbes as palaeontologist to the survey and gave his chief attention to the Palaeozoic fossils, spending much time in Wales and the border counties. He contributed the palaeontological portion to Andrew Crombie Ramsay's Memoir on the Geology of North Wales (1866), assisted Roderick Murchison in his work on Siluria (1854 and later editions), and Adam Sedgwick by preparing A Catalogue of the Collection of Cambrian and Silurian Fossils contained in the Geological Museum of the University of Cambridge (1873).

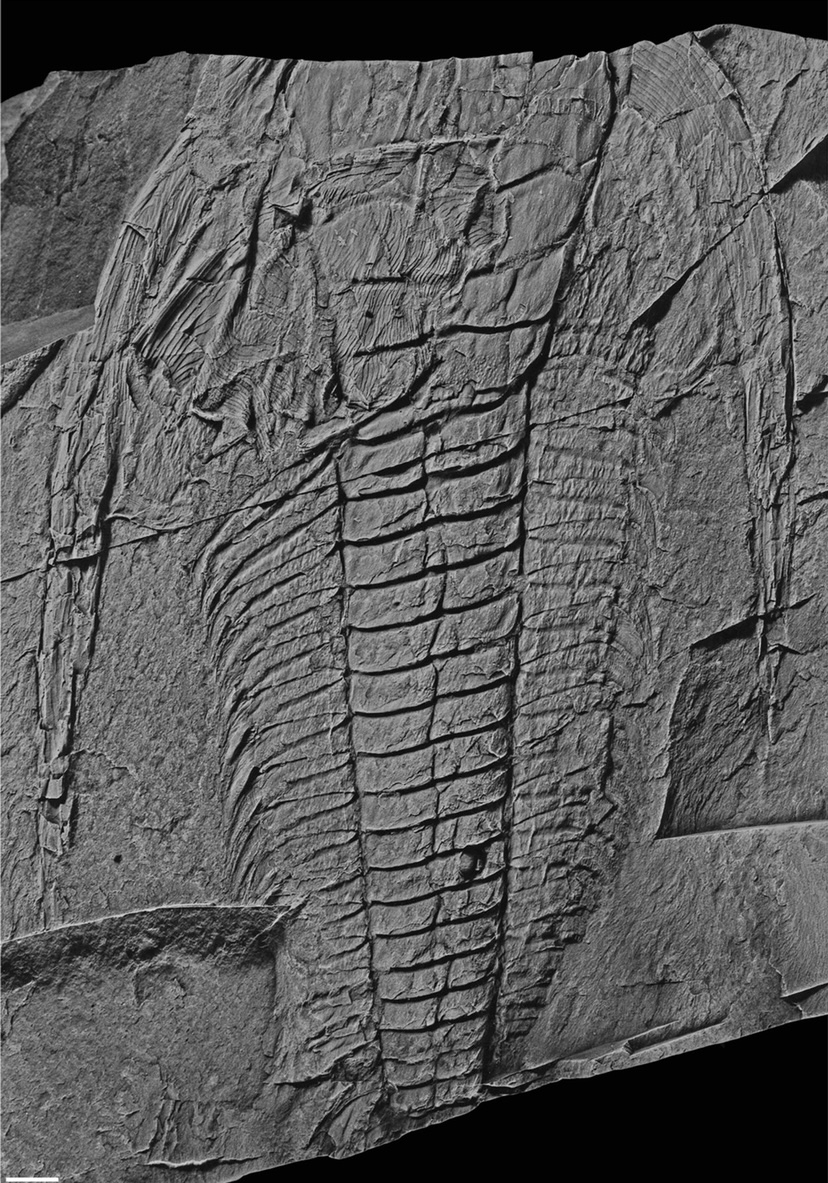
Paradoxides davidis Salter, 1863, from the Menevia Formation, Ptychagnostus punctuosus Biozone of Porth-y-rhaw. Scale bar represents 10 mm.

In the very early 1860's, while collecting fossils in South West Wales as part of his duties for the British Geological Survey, Salter was examining coastal exposures by boat around the St Davids peninsula and landed in the small inlet of Porth-y-rhaw, in the mistaken belief that it was Solva Harbour a short distance to the east. In 1862, while investigating the eastern cliff section and in strata now known as the Menevia Formation (Rees et al., 2014, p. 73) Salter discovered remains of one of the largest trilobites ever found (over 50 cm long) and which, in 1863, he named Paradoxides davidis after his friend David Homfray (1822–1893), an amateur fossil collector from Porthmadog, North West Wales. For many years and up to the time of his death, Homfray was Clerk to the Justices of the Peace for the Penrhyndeudraeth Division.

Encouraged by Salter, Homfray made many important fossil discoveries in the Porthmadog district, Gwynedd, especially within the Tremadocian rocks, and Salter named several species after Homfray to honour his efforts, e.g. Niobe (Niobella) Homfrayi (Salter, 1866, p. 143, pl. 20, fig. 9.), Asaphus Homfrayi Salter (1866) – now Asaphellus homfrayi (Salter) – see Morris (1988): Lectotype, from Garth Hill, near Porthmadog, and Conularia Homfrayi Salter; undifferentiated Type, also from Garth Hill. [(Salter 1866, p. 354, pl. 10, fig. 11); Salter (1873, p. 18, p. 323); Woods, H. (1891, p. 119)].

From the Clogau Formation of Waterfall Valley near Maentwrog, Homfray also discovered for the first time in Britain, Conocoryphe coronata Barrande, 1846, and another species named in his honour, "Conocoryphe" Homfrayi Salter, subsequently assigned to Ptychoparia, Hawle and Corda, 1847.

In 1865 Salter collaborated with Henry Woodward to produce a Chart of Fossil Crustacea. and in the same year published a paper on some Additional Fossils from the Lingula-Flags. in which he named several trilobite species that were subsequently described by Hicks (1872).

Salter prepared several of the Decades of the Geological Survey and became the leading authority on trilobites. He resigned his post on the Geological Survey in 1863 and committed suicide on 2 December 1869 by throwing himself into the Thames. He was buried on the eastern side of Highgate Cemetery in an unmarked grave (no.15356). At the time of his death he had barely completed the illustrated 'Catalogue of Cambrian and Silurian Fossils' (q.v.) in the Woodwardian Museum and he left unfinished a 'Monograph of British Trilobites,’ published by the Palæontographical Society (1864–1867).

He was elected an associate of the Linnean Society in 1842, made a fellow of the Geological Society of London in 1846, and in 1865 was awarded the Wollaston donation-fund by the Geological Society.

== Fossils named in honour of John William Salter ==
=== Problematica ===
- Salterella Billings, 1861. An enigmatic early Cambrian genus questionably assigned to extinct phylum Agmata? and family Salterellidae Walcott, 1886. The genus is characterized by a small calcareous, apparently septate conical shell and lends its name to the Salterella Grit Member of the An t-Sron Formation which forms a narrow, discontinuous belt, extending along the North-western side of Scotland.

=== Trilobites ===
- Salteria Wyville Thomson, 1864 [Family: Raphiophoridae]. Type species, by monotypy, Salteria primaeva Thomson, 1864. Balclatchie Group (Caradoc Series) of the Girvan district, Strathclyde, Scotland.
- Salterolithus Bancroft, 1929 [Family:Trinucleidae]. Type species: Trinucleus Caractaci Murchison, 1839. Harnagian, Welshpool, Powys, Wales.
- Salterocoryphe salteri (Rouault, 1851) [Family: Calymenidae]. Middle Ordovician (Dapingian – Darriwilian)], upper part of the Valongo Formation in Northern Portugal; the Llanvirnian at Guadarranque in Cadiz (Andalusia), Spain and; the 'Llandeilo' south of Rennes in Brittany.

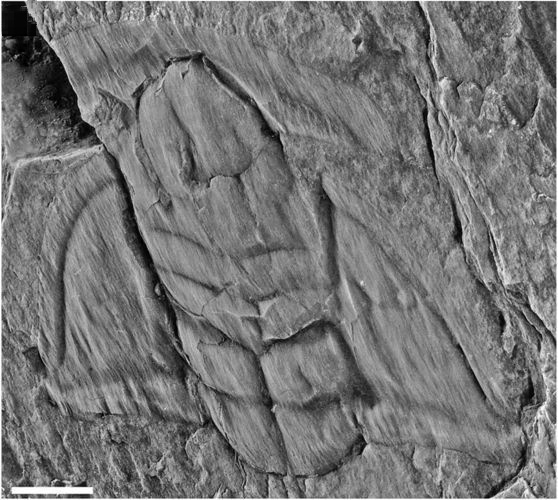
Clarella salteri (Hicks in Salter 1865), Menevia Formation, probably the Pt. punctuosus Biozone in the eastern cliff section of Porth-y-rhaw, St. Davids, Dyfed, Wales. SM A1056. Scale bar represents 5mm.

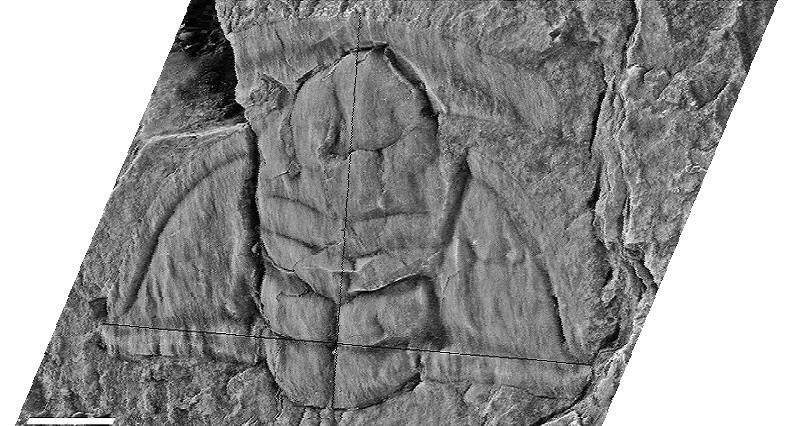
Clarella salteri – SM A1056 with tectonic deformation removed

- Clarella salteri (Hicks in Salter 1865) [Family: Centropleuridae]. Menevia Formation, Pt. punctuosus Biozone, Porth-y-rhaw, St David's, Dyfed, Wales.
- Cnemidopyge Salteri Hicks MS (Salter 1873, p. 22) [Family: Raphiophoridae]. Penmaen Dewi Formation (Whitlandian), middle Arenig Series of Pwlluog, N end of Whitesands Bay, near St David's, Dyfed, Wales.
  - Flexicalymene (Onnicalymene) salteri Bancroft, 1949 [Family: Calymenidae]. Acton Scott Beds (Actonian, Marshbrook, Shropshire, England.
- Leptoplastides salteri (Callaway, 1877) [Family: Olenidae]. Sheinton Shales (Tremadocian Stage) of Sheinton, Shropshire, England.
- Robergiella salteri (Reed, 1899) [Family: Remopleuridae]. Tramore Limestone Formation, ('Llandeilo' and Caradoc Series) of Tramore, County Waterford, Ireland.
- Oryctocephalus salteri Reed, 1910 [Family: Oryctocephalidae]. Wuliuan stage in north side of the Parahio River, Spiti region, India. Parahio Formation, Oryctocephalus salteri Zone.
- Phacops (Viaphacops) salteri Kozlowski, 1923 (p. 54 – 56 pl. 6, fig. 5) [Family: Phacopidae] From the Devonian of Bolivia and Columbia.
- Lotagnostus salteri Westrop and Landing, 2017 [Family: Agnostidae]. From the Chelsey Drive Group, north shore of East Bay, Cape Breton Island, Nova Scotia, Ctenopyge tumida Zone.

=== Brachiopoda ===
- Broeggeria salteri (Holl, 1865) [Family: Elkaniidae]. Obolella salteri Holl, 1865 is type species of the Cambrian lingulid genus Broeggeria Walcott, 1902 and is recorded from the Whiteleaved-Oak Shales (Tremadocian) near Malvern, England.
- Salopia salteri (Davidson, 1869) [Family: Linoporellidae]. From the Horderley Sandstone Formation (upper Sandbian), Horderley. Shropshire, England.
- Spiriferella salteri Tschernyschew, 1902 [Family: Spiriferellidae]. From the Wordian and Capitanian (Permian) of China and British Columbia, Canada.

=== Bivalvia ===
- Schizodus salteri Etheridge [Family: Schizodidae]. Ardross Limestones (Dinantian), Upper Calciferous Sandstone Measures, Ardross, East Fife, Scotland.

=== Gastropoda ===
- Cyrtostropha salteri Ulrich and Scofield 1897 [Family: Murchisoniidae]. From the Ordovician of Canada, Greenland and the United States.

=== Eurypterida ===
- Salteropterus Kjellesvig-Waering, 1951 [Family: Hughmilleriidae]. Named as a species of Eurypterus by Salter in 1859.
- Parahughmilleria salteri Kjellesvig-Waering, 1961 [Order: Eurypterida]. Reported from the Temeside Mudstone Formation (Přídolí epoch) of Ludlow and Perton in the Welsh Borders and South Staffordshire.
- Peltocaris salteriana Jones & Woodward, 1893 [Subclass: Phyllocarida]. From the Tremadocian Stage (Cressagian), Gwynedd, Wales.

=== Ophiuroidea ===
- Salteraster Stürtz 1893 [Family: Urasterellidae]. Type species; Urasterella asperrimus Salter 1857.
- Stenaster salteri Billings, 1858 [Class: Ophiuroidea]. From the Ordovician of Cardin quarry, Simcoe County, Kirkfield, Ontario, Canada.

=== Thyestiida ===
The thyestidians (Thyestiida) are an order of bony-armored jawless fish in the extinct vertebrate class Osteostraci and including the poorly understood osteostracan genus Auchenaspis Egerton, 1857.

- Auchenaspis salteri Egerton (1857, p. 286, pl. 9, figs 4 – 5) [Subphylum: Vertebrata]. The species is known from the Ledbury Formation (Red Downton Formation) of Ledbury, Herefordshire and Ludlow, Shropshire. Přídolí, i.e. the uppermost Silurian.

=== Graptolithina ===
A subclass of the class Pterobranchia, the members of which are known as graptolites.

- Callograptus? salteri Hall. 1865 [Family: Dendrograptidae]. From the 'Arenigian' of Shropshire and Wales and occurring as far afield as China and Tasmania.

== See also ==
- Henry Hicks (geologist)
