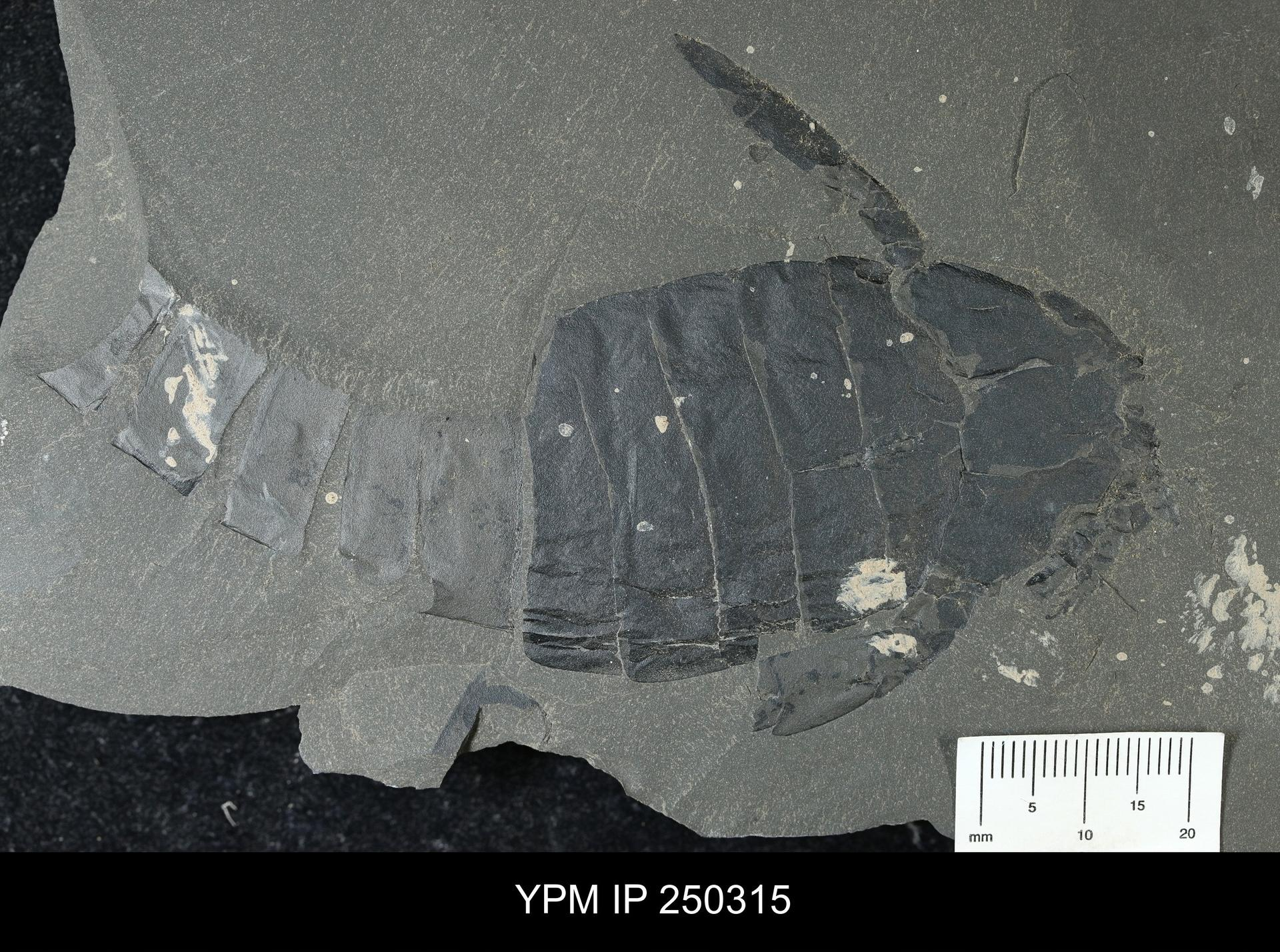
- Fossil of Hughmilleria sp., collected in the United States

Scientific classification
- Kingdom: Animalia
- Phylum: Arthropoda
- Subphylum: Chelicerata
- Order: †Eurypterida
- Superfamily: †Pterygotioidea
- Family: †Hughmilleriidae; Kjellesvig-Waering, 1951
- Genus: †Hughmilleria; Sarle, 1903

Type species
- †Hughmilleria socialis Sarle, 1903

Species
- †H. saetiger (Kjellesvig-Waering, 1964); †H. shawangunk Clarke, 1907; †H. socialis Sarle, 1903

= Hughmilleria =

Hughmilleria Temporal range: Llandovery-Ludlow, 442–418.7 Ma

Genus of extinct arthropods

Hughmilleria is a genus of eurypterid, an extinct group of aquatic arthropods. Fossils of Hughmilleria have been discovered in deposits of the Silurian age in China and the United States. Classified as part of the basal family Hughmilleriidae, the genus contains three species, H. shawangunk from the eastern United States, H. socialis from Pittsford, New York, and H. saetiger from Pennsylvania. The genus is named in honor of the Scottish geologist Hugh Miller.

H. socialis is the type species of Hughmilleriidae, a eurypterid family classified in the superfamily Pterygotioidea that is differentiated by their streamlined bodies, the enlargement of their medium-sized chelicerae and the presence of paired spines on the walking appendages. With the biggest specimen measuring 20 centimetres (8 inches) in length, Hughmilleria is considered a eurypterid of small size.

== Description ==
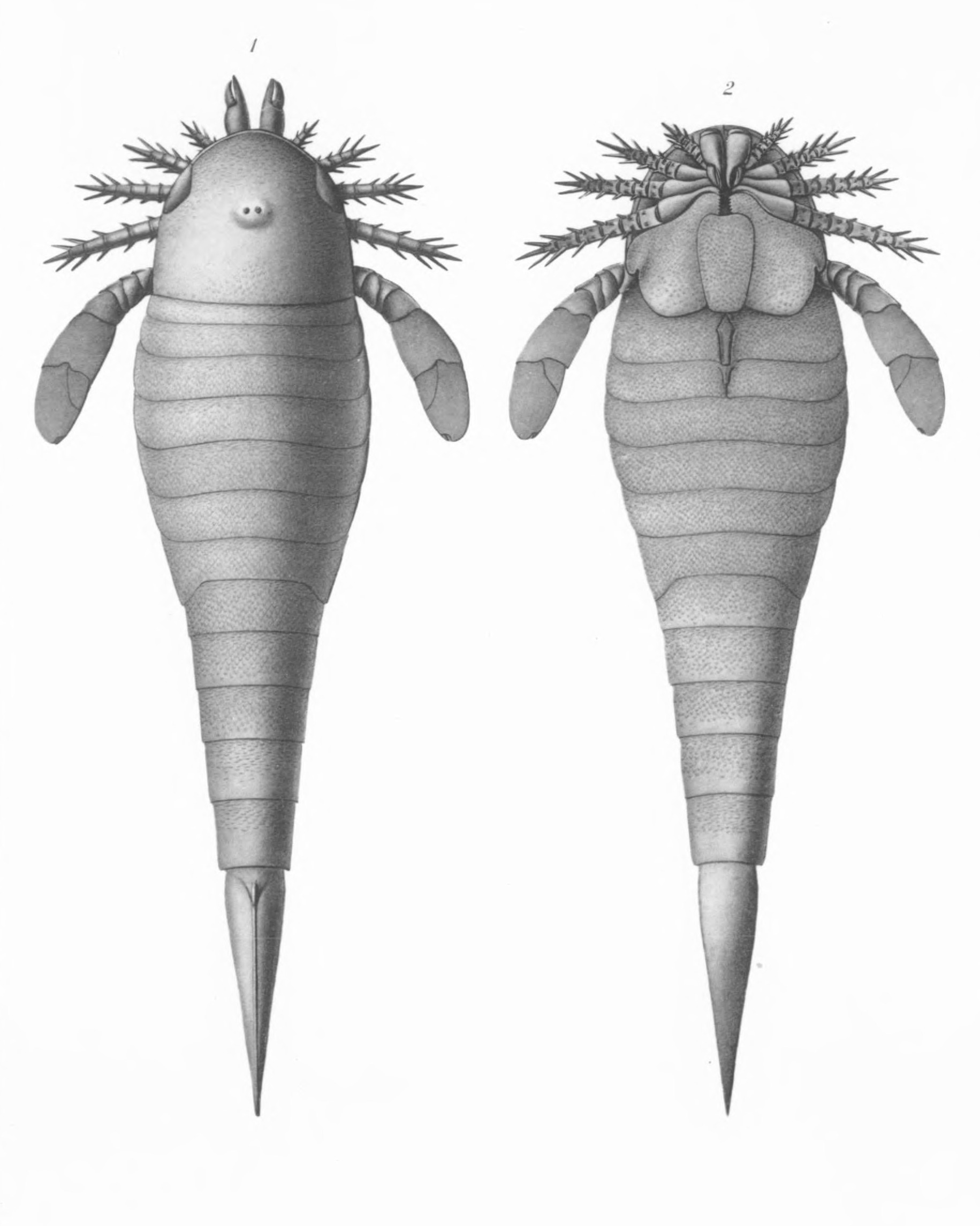
Restoration of H. socialis

Hughmilleria is the most basal (primitive) known member of the Pterygotioidea. It was a small-sized eurypterid, with the largest specimen measuring 20 cm (8 in), being surpassed by other members of its superfamily, such as Slimonia acuminata, which measured 100 cm (39 in) in length, and Pterygotus grandidentatus, which could reach 1.75 meters (5 ft 8 in). The telson (the most posterior segment of the body), which was lanceolate and styliform, is distinctly a Eurypterus-like feature. The marginal compound eyes, the relatively large chelae and the cordate (heart-shaped) metastoma (a large plate that is part of the abdomen) show a great resemblance to Pterygotus. The carapace was parabolic or subquadrate with oval marginal eyes, the chelicerae were able to extend beyond the carapace margin and the appendages II–V were spiniferous. The genus is in various ways similar to the more derived eurypterids of its superfamily, the Pterygotioidea, however, it lacked the expanded and flattened telson that the pterygotids and Slimonia had. This suggests that Hughmilleria did not need to use the telson as a rudder to swim.

Hughmilleria is distinguished from other members of Pterygotioidea by its streamlined body, its subquadrate prosoma (head), its medium-sized chelicerae, its small overall size and the various characteristics it shares with Eurypterus.

== History of research ==
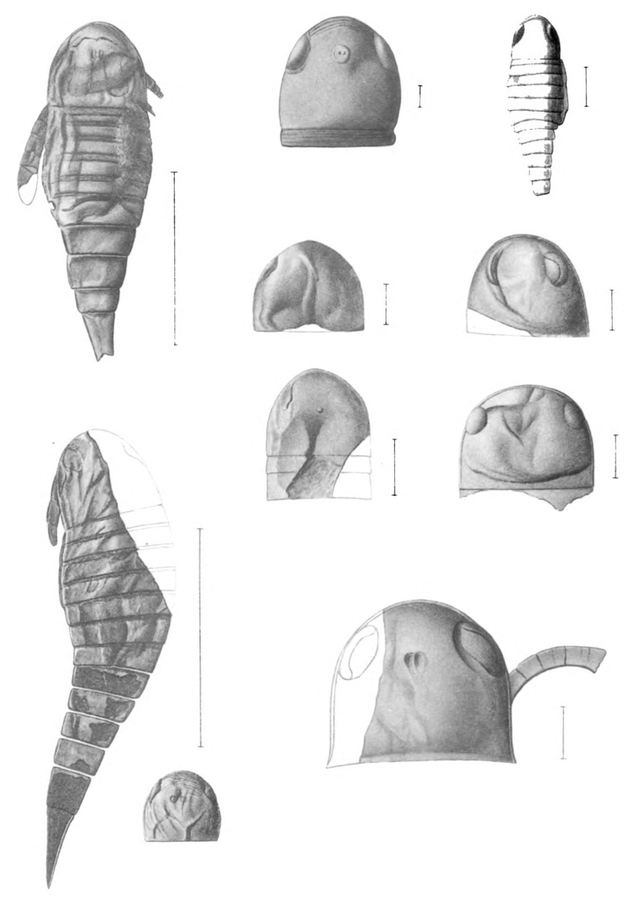
Fossils of H. shawangunk

The genus Hughmilleria was erected by the American geologist Clifton J. Sarle in 1903 to contain the species H. socialis, which was recovered for the first time in the Pittsford Shale Member of the Vernon Formation, New York. This species is the most abundant species of pterygotioid in the area with around 450 specimens found. The generic name derives from Hugh Miller, a Scottish geologist and writer who found fossils of eurypterids of the Silurian, among them Hughmilleria. A variety of H. socialis was also described, Hughmilleria socialis var. robusta, but currently it is considered a synonym of the species mentioned.

Four years later, a second species was discovered among the fauna of the Shawangunk grit at Otisville. It was described as Hughmilleria shawangunk and was smaller than H. socialis. The temporal range of H. shawangunk has been placed between the Llandovery and Ludlow epoch. The largest specimens measured 12 cm (5 in) in length, and differ from the type species by the carapace, which was broader, and the compound eyes which were larger and more prominent than the eyes of H. socialis, among other aspects.

The family Pterygotidae was erected in 1912 by John Mason Clarke and Rudolf Ruedemann to constitute a group for the genera Pterygotus, Slimonia, Hastimima and Hughmilleria. However, Erik N. Kjellesvig-Waering emended the family in 1951, when the genera Hastimima, Hughmilleria, Grossopterus and Slimonia were referred to their own family, the Hughmilleriidae, which left Pterygotus as the only genus within the Pterygotidae. In 1961, Erik N. Kjellesvig-Waering split Hughmilleria into two subgenera, Hughmilleria (Hughmilleria) and Hughmilleria (Nanahughmilleria), although Nanahughmilleria would be later raised to the genus level.

The species H. saetiger was originally named as a species of Erettopterus. Known from a single metastoma, H. saetiger was reclassified as a species of Hughmilleria in 2025, since the metastoma is parapetaloid in shape, different from the rhombiovate metastomas of Erettopterus. Parapetaloid metastomas are known only securely in Hughmilleria.

In 2007, a new species of Hughmilleria from Hunan, China, was described as H. wangi. H. wangi was reclassified as the distinct genus Hunanopterus in 2025.

== Classification ==
Size comparison of the two species of Hughmilleria, and Hunanopterus ("Hughmilleria" wangi)

Hughmilleria is classified within the family Hughmilleriidae in the superfamily Pterygotioidea. Historically Hughmilleria was first considered a member of the Pterygotidae until it was assigned to its own family alongside other genera that would later be reclassified. The Hughmilleriidae was previously considered to contain both Hughmilleria and the related Herefordopterus but Herefordopterus has since been reclassified in its own family, Herefordopteridae, leaving Hughmilleriidae monotypic.

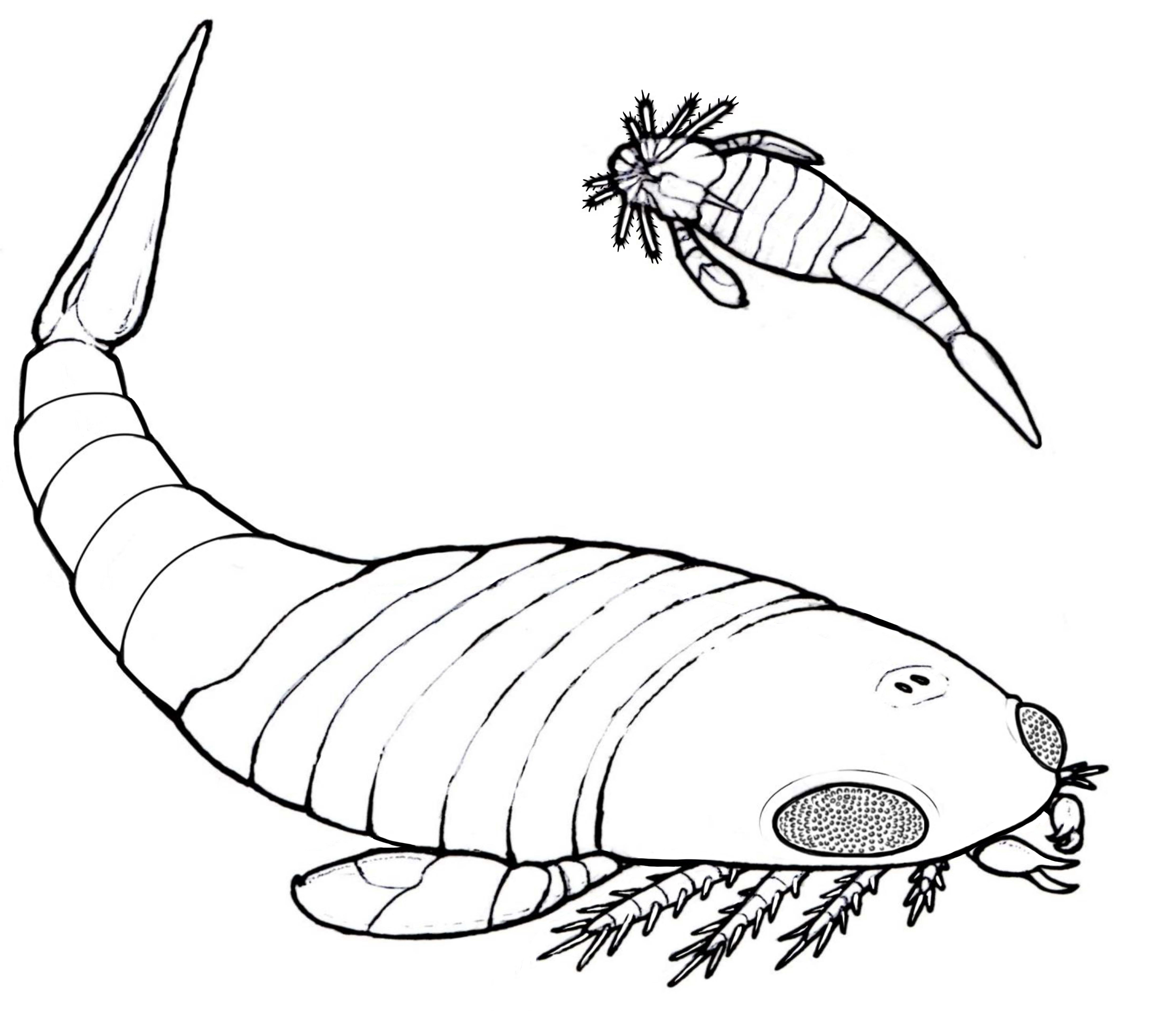
Life restoration of H. shawangunk

Hughmilleria and Herefordopterus shared a subtriangular carapace outline with the pterygotids and the wide telson and genital appendages of all three taxa were similar, although the genital appendages of Hughmilleria and Herefordopterus were more similar to those of Slimonia by the division of these into three segments, in contrast to the undivided morphology in the pterygotids. Still, Hughmilleria and Herefordopterus differed from pterygotids and slimonids by the presence of paired spines on the walking appendages, that along with the characteristics that Slimonia and Ciurcopterus share, suggest that the hughmilleriids were more distant from the pterygotids than Slimonia was. Within Hughmilleriidae, both genera possessed a marginal rim much broader anteriorly than posteriorly and appendages spiniferous of Hughmilleria-type, but Hughmilleria had 18-20 gnathobasic (of the gnathobase, a lower appendage used in the alimentation) teeth on appendage VI, unlike Herefordopterus and the pterygotids, who had 12-13. Therefore, Hughmilleria represents the most basal form of Pterygotioidea.

According to Clifton J. Sarle, Hughmilleria was very similar to Eurypterus, and could be confused with a species of this genus if it was not for the presence of the marginal position of the eyes and the relatively large chelae. However, by its cordate metastoma, the intramarginal to marginal position of the compound eyes, the slightly longer preoral appendages, less developed swimming legs and the opercular appendage, Hughmilleria was more like Pterygotus.

The cladogram presented below, derived from a 2025 study by researcher James Lamsdell, showcases the interrelationships between the pterygotioid eurypterids.

- Pterygotioidea
  - Hunanopteridae
    Hunanopterus wangi
  - - Hughmilleriidae
      - Hughmilleria shawangunk
      - Hughmilleria socialis
    - - Herefordopteridae
        Herefordopterus banksii
      - - Slimonidae
          - Salteropterus abbreviatus
          - Slimonia acuminata
        - - Ciurcopteridae
            Ciurcopterus ventricosus
          - Pterygotidae
            - - Erettopterus waylandsmithi
              - - Erettopterus osiliensis
                - Erettopterus quijingensis
                - - Erettopterus bilobus
                  - Erettopterus serricaudatus
            - - - Pterygotus ludensis
                - - Pterygotus anglicus
                  - Pterygotus wanggaii
              - - - Jaekelopterus howelli
                  - Jaekelopterus rhenaniae
                - - Acutiramus bohemicus
                  - - Acutiramus macrophthalmus
                    - Acutiramus cummingsi

== Paleoecology ==
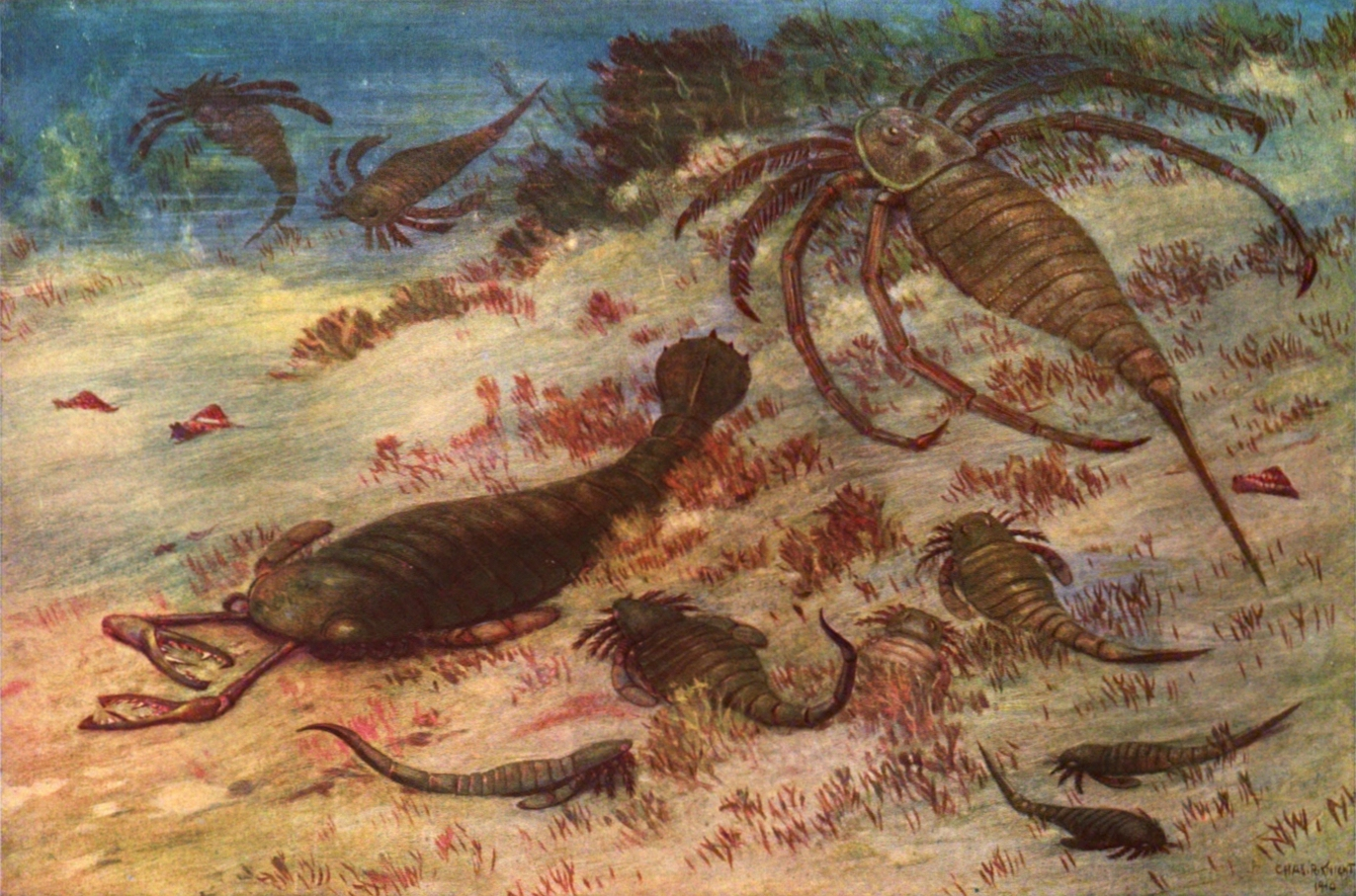
Painting painted in 1912 by Charles R. Knight depicting various eurypterids discovered in New York. The painting includes Dolichopterus, Eusarcana, Stylonurus, Eurypterus and Pterygotus. Hughmilleria can be seen in the bottom of the right corner.

Fossils of Hughmilleria have been found in Silurian deposits from the Llandovery and Ludlow epochs. Together with its close relatives, Hughmilleria dominated the communities in brackish and fresh water, while Pterygotus and Eurypterus dominated marine environments.

The Silurian deposits of the Pittsford Shale Member in which fossils of H. socialis have been found shelter various faunas of eurypterids, including Mixopterus multispinosus, Erettoperus osiliensis, Eurypterus pittsfordensis and Carcinosoma spiniferus, among others. Fossils from other organisms were also found, such as the crustacean Ceratiocaris and the ostracod Leperditia. Geological features of the formation, such as the friable and calcareous mudstone, the argillaceous dolomite and the lithology and associated biota suggests that the environment was marginal marine, very shallow and probably brackish.

== See also ==
- List of eurypterid genera
- Timeline of eurypterid research
- Pterygotidae
- Herefordopterus
