= Patrick Burn Formation =

Geological formation in Scotland

- Stratigraphic range: Upper Llandovery
- Type: Formation
- Unit of: Priesthill Group
- Underlies: Castle Formation
- Overlies: Ponesk Burn Formation (presumed, actual boundary is cut by a fault)
- Thickness: 850 m

Lithology
- Primary: Sandstone, Siltstone, Mudstone

Location
- Region: Scotland
- Country: United Kingdom

The Patrick Burn Formation is a Silurian aged geological formation outcropping near Lesmahagow in Lanarkshire in the Scottish Lowlands. Fossils are known from the formation, including from the Birk Knowes locality.

== Description ==
According to the British Geological Survey, the primary lithology of the formation consists of "Alternating beds of grey feldspathic, medium-grained turbiditic sandstone and grey siltstone with beds of grey laminated siltstone and silty mudstone." The Birk Knowes site contains fossils from non-marine or marginal marine environment. In 2000, Birk Knowes was closed by the Scottish government agency Scottish Natural Heritage (now NatureScot), due to the theft of specimens from the site by amateur collectors during the preceding decades, who essentially exhausted the fossiliferous deposit. At least some of the fossils ended up in a museum in Berlin, who refused to return them.

== Paleobiota ==
=== Arthropods ===
Arthropods
Species	Notes	Images
Slimonia acuminata	A slimonid eurypterid.	
Erettopterus bilobus	A pterygotid eurypterid.	
Selkiepterella lanceolata	An adelophthalmid eurypterid, previously a species of Nanahughmilleria.	
Waterstonopterus lanarkensis	A hardieopterid eurypterid, previously a species of Hardieopterus.	
Loganamaraspis dunlopi	A chasmataspidid.	
Cyamocephalus loganensis	A synziphosurine.	
Pseudoniscus falcatus	A synziphosurine.	
Ainiktozoon loganense	A thylacocephalan.	
Ceratiocaris papilio	A phyllocarid.	

=== Chordates ===
Chordates
Species	Notes	Images
Loganellia scotica	A loganelliid thelodont.	
Jamoytius kerwoodi	An enigmatic chordate.	

== See also ==
- List of fossiliferous stratigraphic units in Scotland
