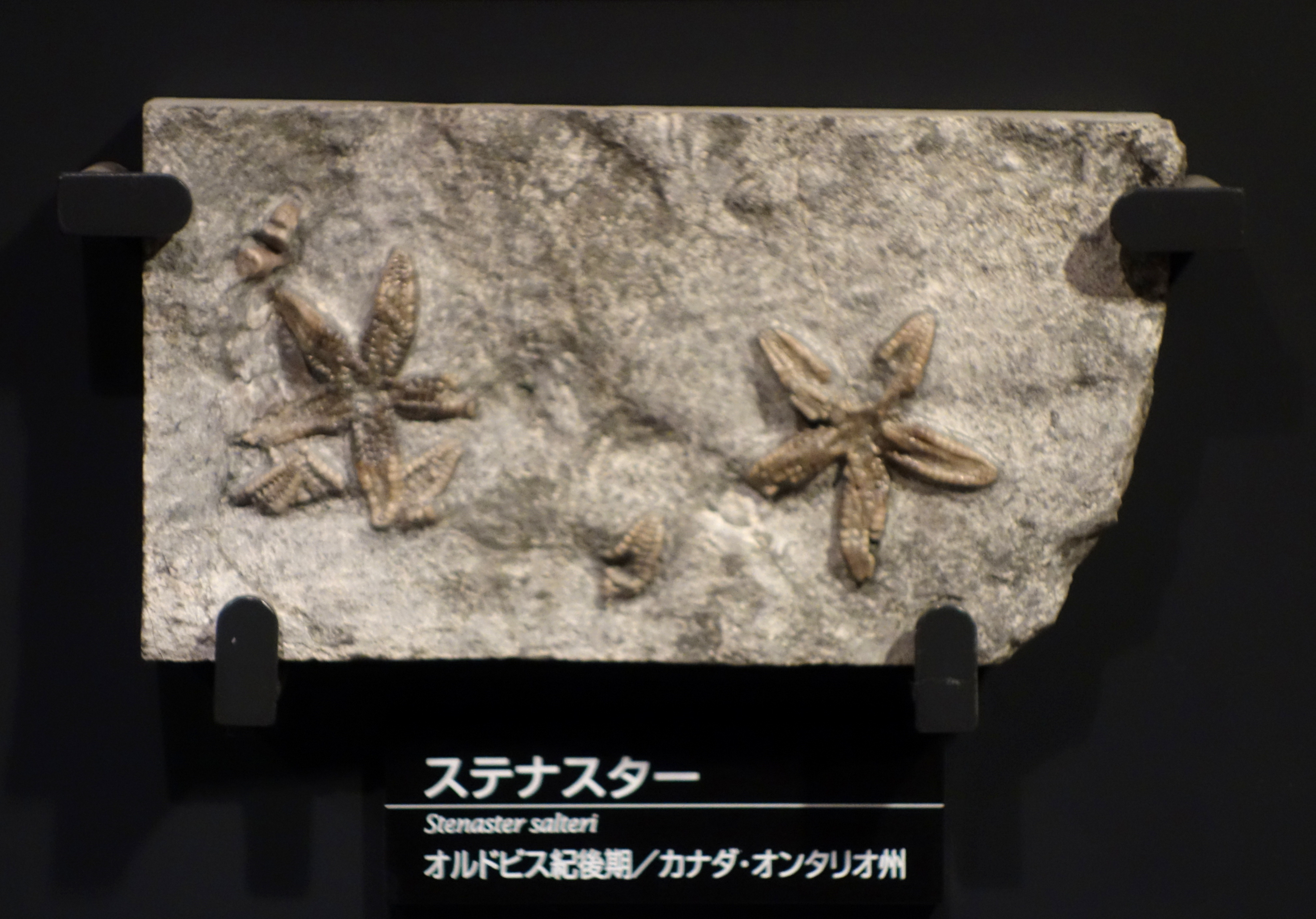
- Stenaster salteri

Scientific classification
- Kingdom: Animalia
- Phylum: Echinodermata
- Family: †Stenasteridae
- Genus: †Stenaster Billings, 1857

= Stenaster =

Stenaster Temporal range: Ordovician

Extinct genus of echinoderms

Stenaster is an extinct genus of echinoderms that lived in the Ordovician.
