= Metastoma =

Abdominal plate present in some anthropods

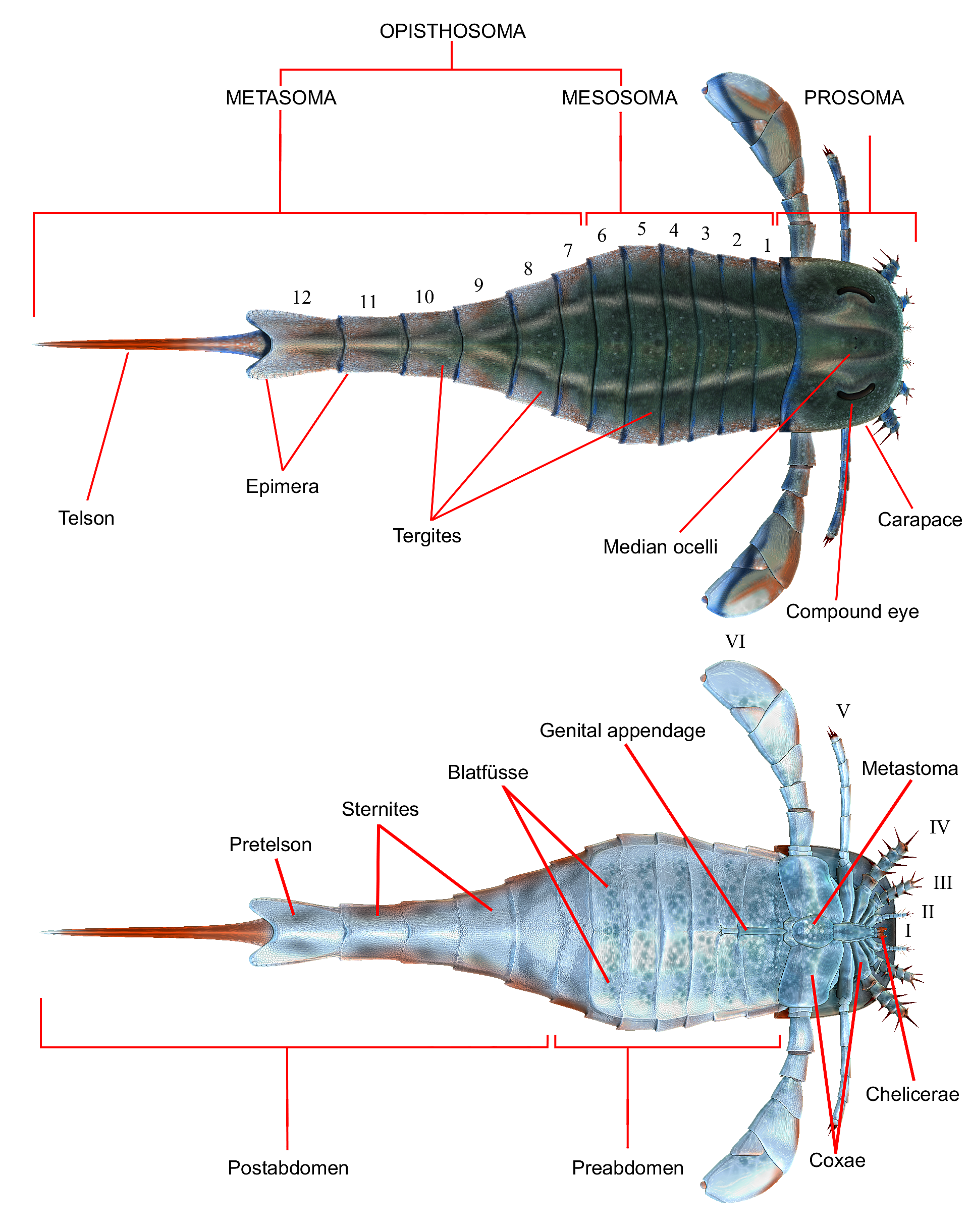
Restoration of Eurypterus with the general body parts of a eurypterid labelled. The metastoma can be seen between the pair of swimming paddles in the ventral view.

The metastoma is a ventral single plate located in the opisthosoma of non-arachnid dekatriatan chelicerates such as eurypterids, chasmataspidids and the genus Houia. The metastoma located between the base of 6th prosomal appendage pair and may had functioned as part of the animal's feeding structures. It most likely represented a fused appendage pair originated from somite 7 (first opisthosomal segment), thus homologous to the chilaria of horseshoe crab and 4th walking leg pair of sea spider. In eurypterids, the plate was typically cordate (heart-shaped) in shape, though differed in shape in some genera, such as Megalograptus.
