= Barusopterus =

Barusopterus Temporal range: Silurian

Scientific classification
- Kingdom: Animalia
- Phylum: Arthropoda
- Subphylum: Chelicerata
- Order: †Eurypterida
- Family: †Strobilopteridae
- Genus: †Barusopterus; Lamsdell, 2025
- Species: †B. limuloides

Binomial name
- †Barusopterus limuloides Kjellesvig-Waering, 1948

Extinct genus of Eurypterid

Barusopterus is a genus of strobilopterid eurypterid that lived in Indiana, US during the Silurian period. This genus contains a single species, Barusopterus limuloides, making it a monotypic taxon. It is broad and stocky making it incredibly broad-bodied for eurypterids. It had relatively short prosomal appendages, especially appendage VI, which projects from under the prosomal carapace at the sixth podomere. It was similar to Buffalopterus mainly differing in the intensity of the cuticular ornamentation and shape of the telson.

== Discovery ==
This genus is known from a single complete specimen. It was discovered in the Kokomo Formation of Indiana, United States.

When the specimen was described, it was originally described to the genus Onychopterella (known as Onychopterus at the time). However it was noted that there were numerous major differences between the specimen and Onychopterella kokomoensis. It was then placed into genus Erieopterus.

== Etymology ==
The genus name Barusopterus comes from the Greek word βαρύς which means "heavy" combined with -pterus, a common suffix traditionally used to eurypterid genera.
