= Kokomo Formation =

Geologic formation in Indiana, USA

- Stratigraphic range: Silurian
- Type: Formation

Location
- Region: Indiana
- Country: United States

The Kokomo Formation is a geologic formation in Indiana. It preserves fossils dating back to the Silurian period, most notably sea scorpions.

== List of Known Taxa ==
=== Eurypterids ===
- Carcinosoma newlini
- Kokomopterus longicaudatus
- Erieopterus limuloides
- Erieopterus ranilarva
- Onychopterella kokomensis
- Leperditia ohioensis

=== Brachiopods ===
- Lingula sp.
- Pentamerus divergens
- Schuchertella interstriata

=== Cnidarians ===
- Halysites labyrnthicus

== See also ==
- List of fossiliferous stratigraphic units in Indiana

== Sources ==
- Various Contributors to the Paleobiology Database. "Fossilworks: Gateway to the Paleobiology Database". Archived from the original on 19 August 2022.
