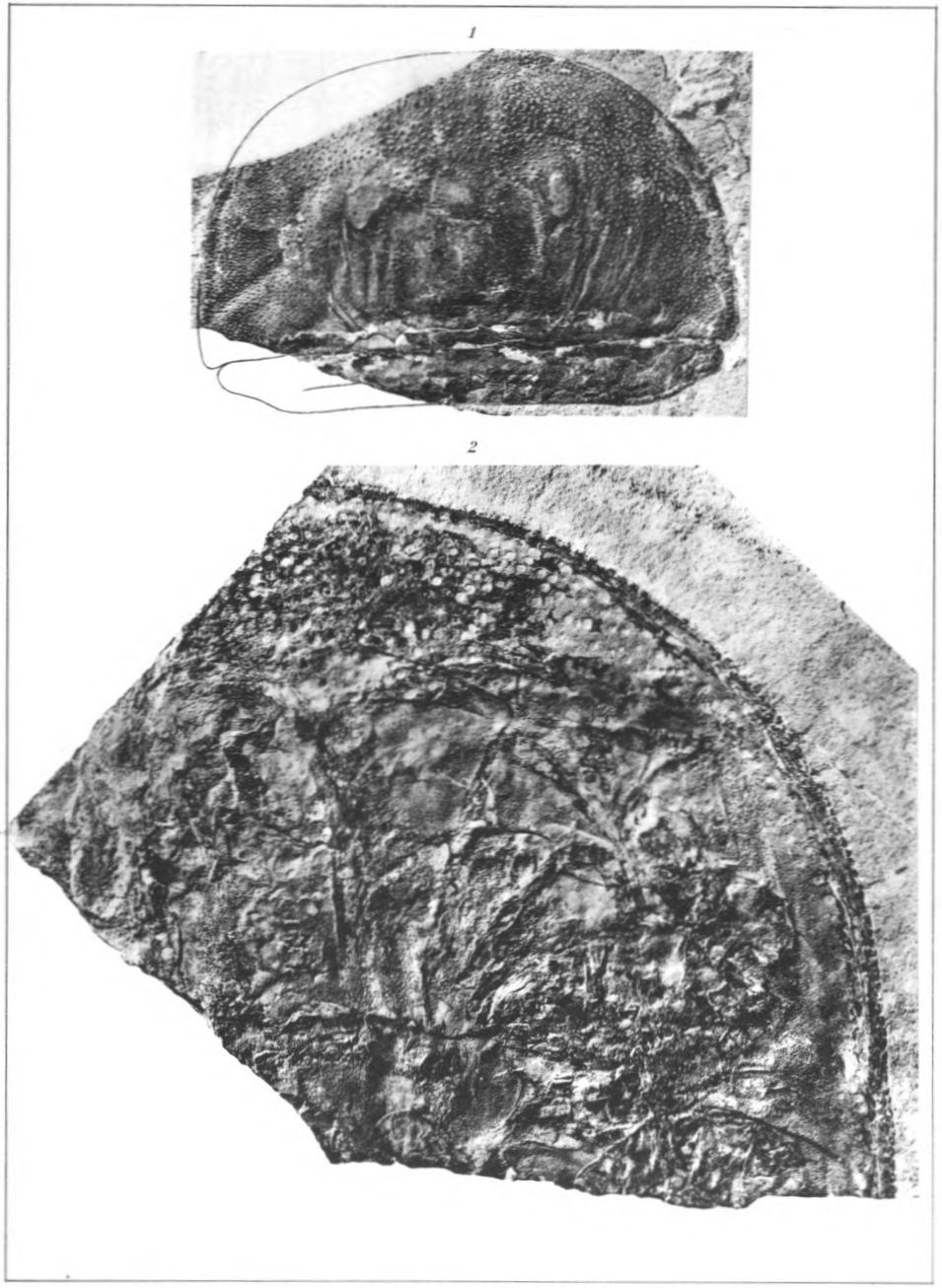
- Fossils

Scientific classification
- Kingdom: Animalia
- Phylum: Arthropoda
- Subphylum: Chelicerata
- Order: †Eurypterida
- Superfamily: †Dolichopteroidea
- Family: †Strobilopteridae
- Genus: †Buffalopterus; Kjellesvig-Waering & Heubusch, 1962

Type species
- †Buffalopterus pustulosus Kjellesvig-Waering & Heubusch, 1962

Synonyms
- Eurypterus giganteus Pohlman, 1882; Pterygotus globicaudatus Pohlman, 1882

= Buffalopterus =

Buffalopterus Temporal range: Silurian

Genus of arthropods (fossil)

Buffalopterus is a prehistoric eurypterid from the Silurian-aged Bertie Formation of New York and Ontario. The genus contains one species, B. pustulosus. It is closely related to Strobilopterus, but differs primarily by having a bizarre, globular telson (which is otherwise sword-like or spine-like in other eurypterids), and in size, being estimated to be around 1 metre (3.3 ft), although later study show size estimation of 30 centimetres (12 in).

== See also ==
- List of eurypterids
