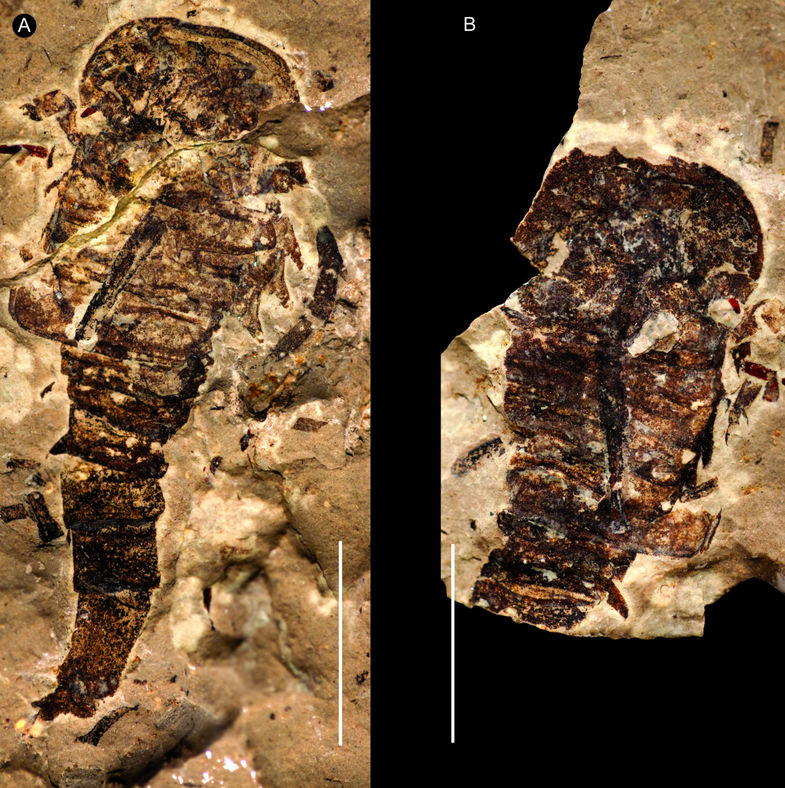
- Fossils of Strobilopterus

Scientific classification
- Kingdom: Animalia
- Phylum: Arthropoda
- Subphylum: Chelicerata
- Order: †Eurypterida
- Superfamily: †Dolichopteroidea
- Family: †Strobilopteridae; Lamsdell, 2025

Genera
- †Barusopterus; †Buffalopterus; †Strobilopterus

= Strobilopteridae =

Strobilopteridae Temporal range: Silurian–Devonian

Extinct family of eurypterids

Strobilopteridae is an extinct family of eurypterids that lived in the Silurian and Devonian periods. The family is one of three families contained in the superfamily Dolichopteroidea (along with Dolichopteridae and Erieopteridae), which in turn is one of the superfamilies classified as part of the suborder Eurypterina. The family contains three genera, Barusopterus, Buffalopterus and Strobilopterus.

Strobilopterids were eurypterines with semicircular carapaces, a short appendage VI that barely projected from beneath the carapace, ornamentation on the carapace radiating from the lateral eyes and curving around the margins of the carapace and a row of angular scales across the posterior of the tergites on the metasoma.
