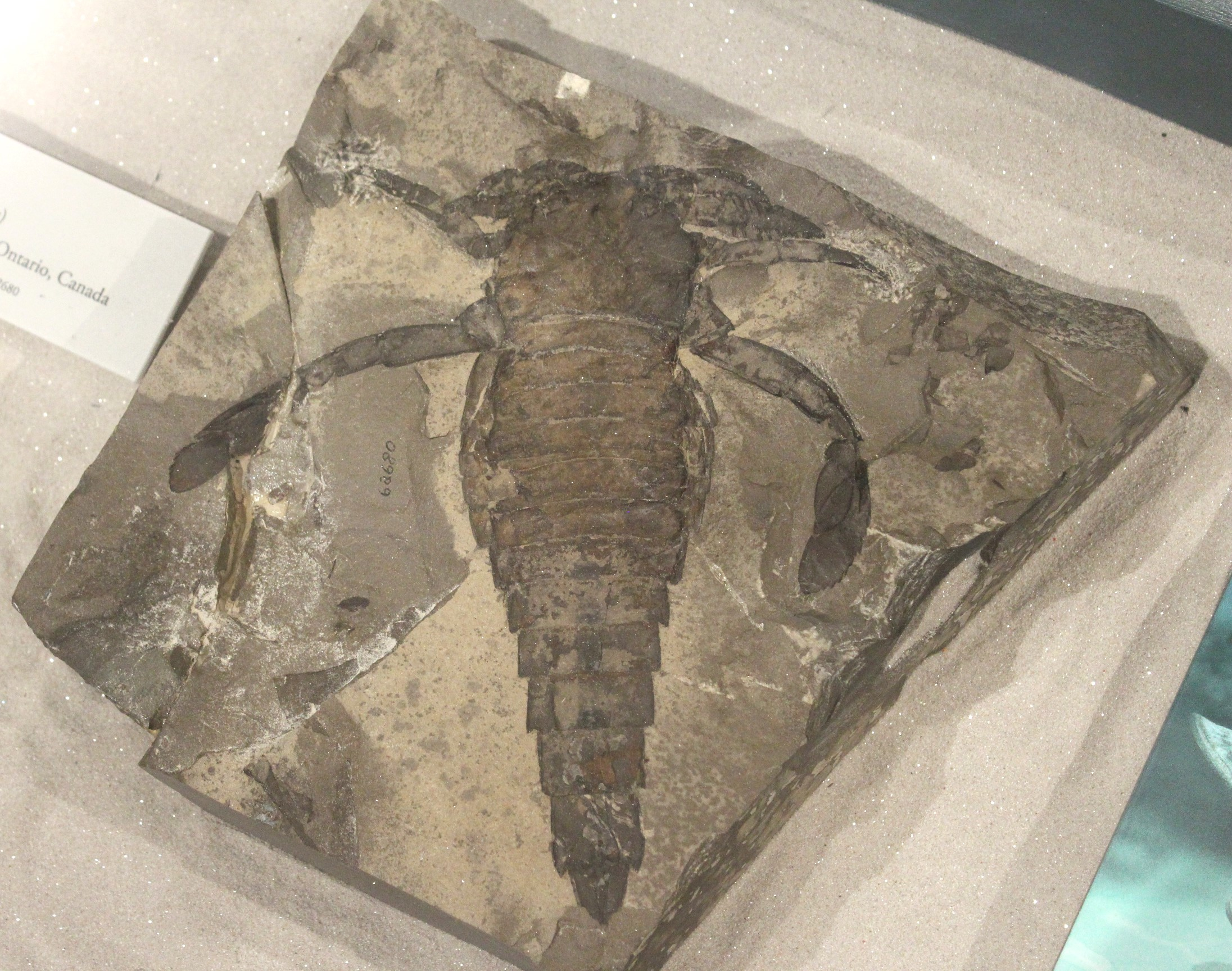
- Fossil of Dolichopterus

Scientific classification
- Kingdom: Animalia
- Phylum: Arthropoda
- Subphylum: Chelicerata
- Order: †Eurypterida
- Suborder: †Eurypterina
- Superfamily: †Dolichopteroidea; Kjellesvig-Waering & Størmer, 1952

Families
- †Dolichopteridae; †Erieopteridae; †Strobilopteridae

= Dolichopteroidea =

Dolichopteroidea Temporal range: Katian–Emsian

Extinct superfamily of sea scorpions

Dolichopteroidea is an extinct superfamily of eurypterids. The group contains three families: Dolichopteridae, Erieopteridae, and Strobilopteridae.

Under previous classification schemes, the dolichopteroids were sometimes classified as part of the Eurypteroidea superfamily.
