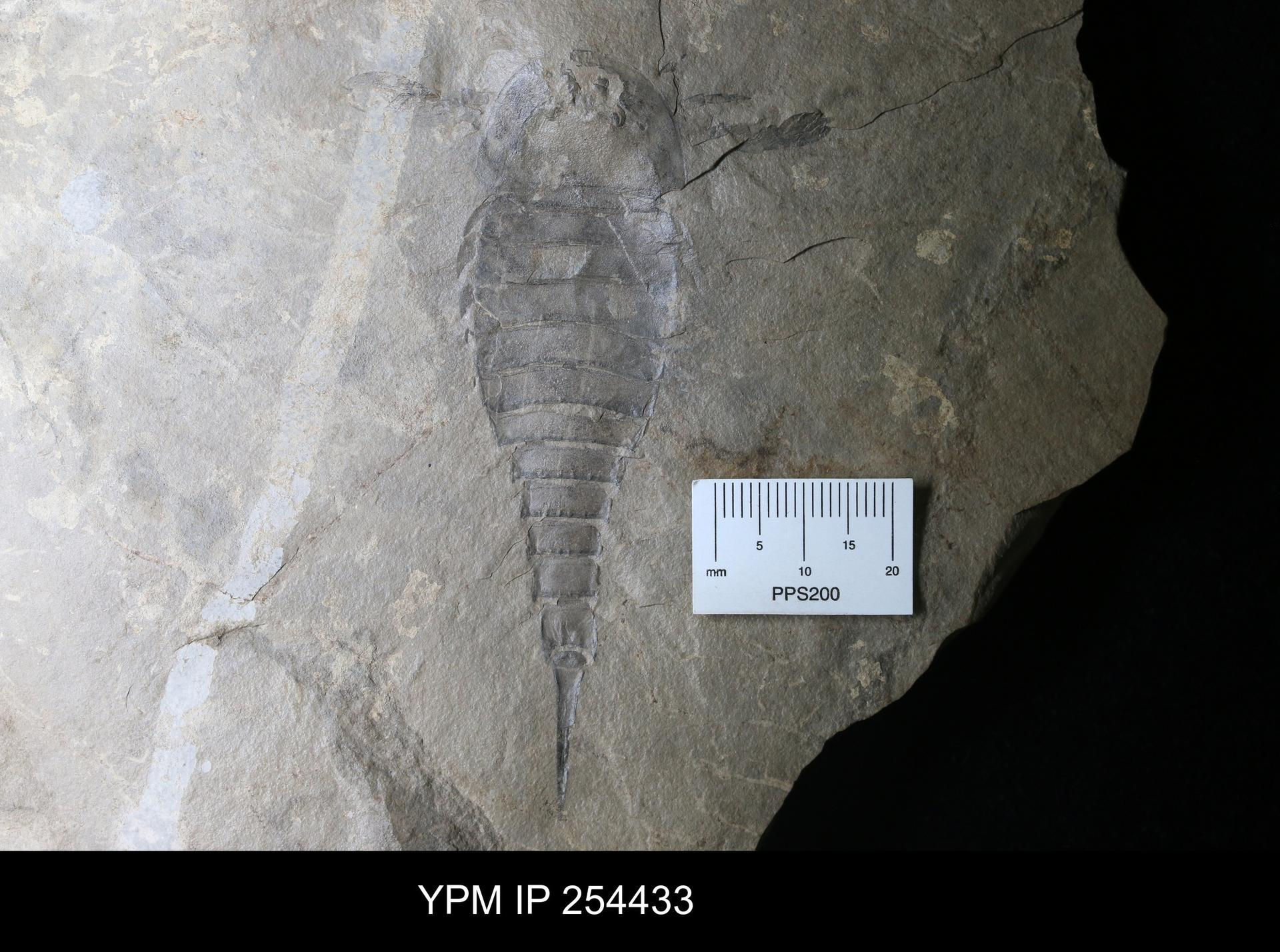
- Fossil of Erieopterus sp.

Scientific classification
- Kingdom: Animalia
- Phylum: Arthropoda
- Subphylum: Chelicerata
- Order: †Eurypterida
- Superfamily: †Dolichopteroidea
- Family: †Erieopteridae; Tollerton, 1989
- Genus: †Erieopterus; Kjellesvig-Waering, 1958

Type species
- †Erieopterus microphthalmus Hall, 1859

Species
- See text

= Erieopterus =

Erieopterus Temporal range: Silurian–Devonian

Extinct genus of arthropods

Erieopterus is a genus of prehistoric eurypterid found in Silurian to Devonian-aged marine and freshwater strata of North America. The genus contains three species from the Silurian to the Devonian. Erieopterus is the only genus in the family Erieopteridae, part of the Dolichopteroidea superfamily.

== Species ==
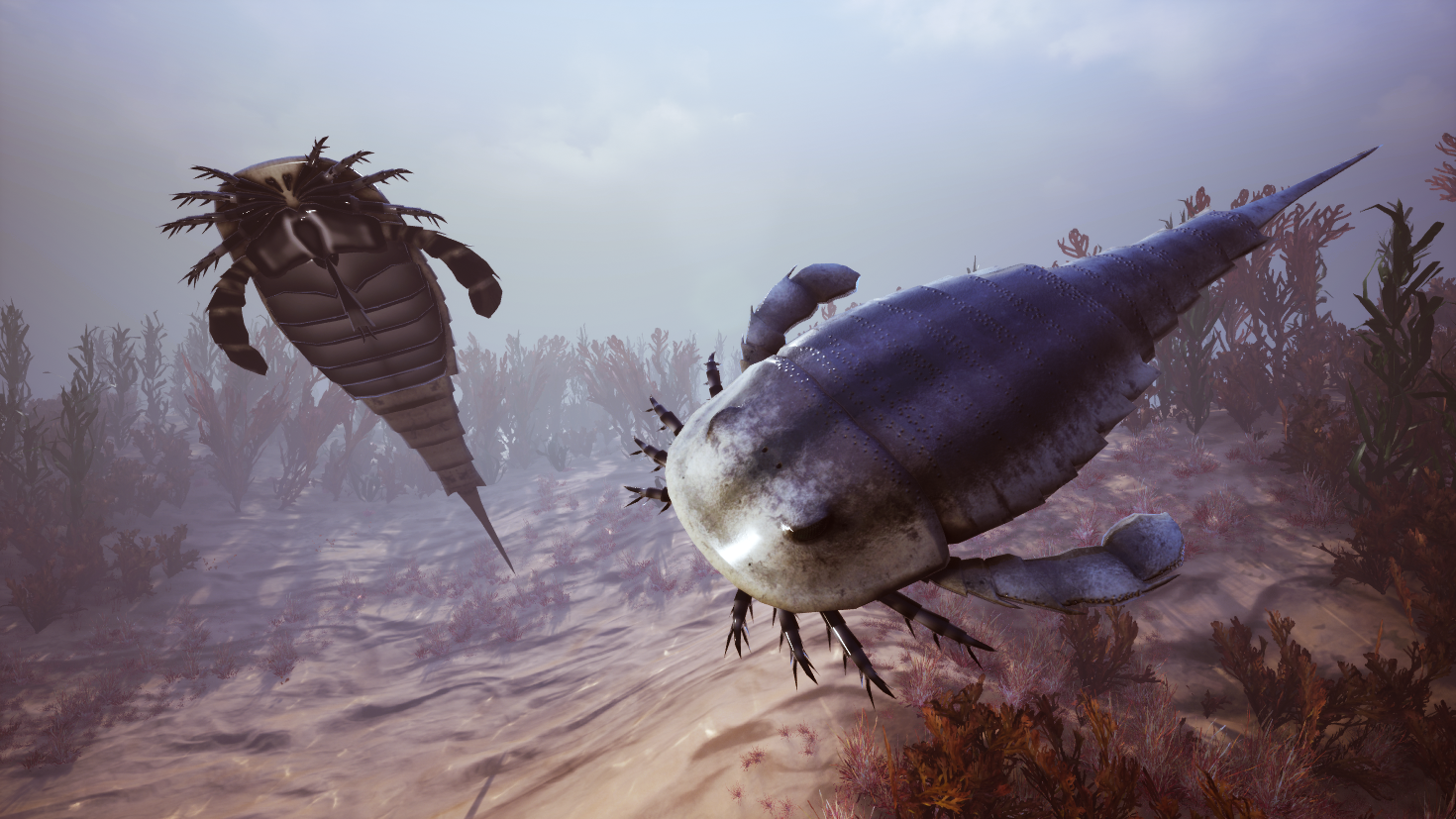
Reconstruction of Erieopterus

- Erieopterus eriensis (Whitfield, 1882) — Silurian, USA
- Erieopterus microphthalmus (Hall, 1859) — Devonian, USA & Canada
- Erieopterus phillipsensis Copeland, 1971 — Silurian. Canada

Invalid species

- "Erieopterus hypsophthalmus" Kjellesvig-Waering, 1958 — Silurian, USA, synonym of E. eriensis
- "Erieopterus laticeps" (Schmidt, 1883) — Silurian, Norway, assigned to Strobilopterus
- "Erieopterus limuloides" (Kjellesvig-Waering, 1948) — Silurian, USA, assigned to Barusopterus
- "Erieopterus turgidus" Stumm & Kjellesvig-Waering, 1962 — Silurian, USA, synonym of E. microphthalmus
