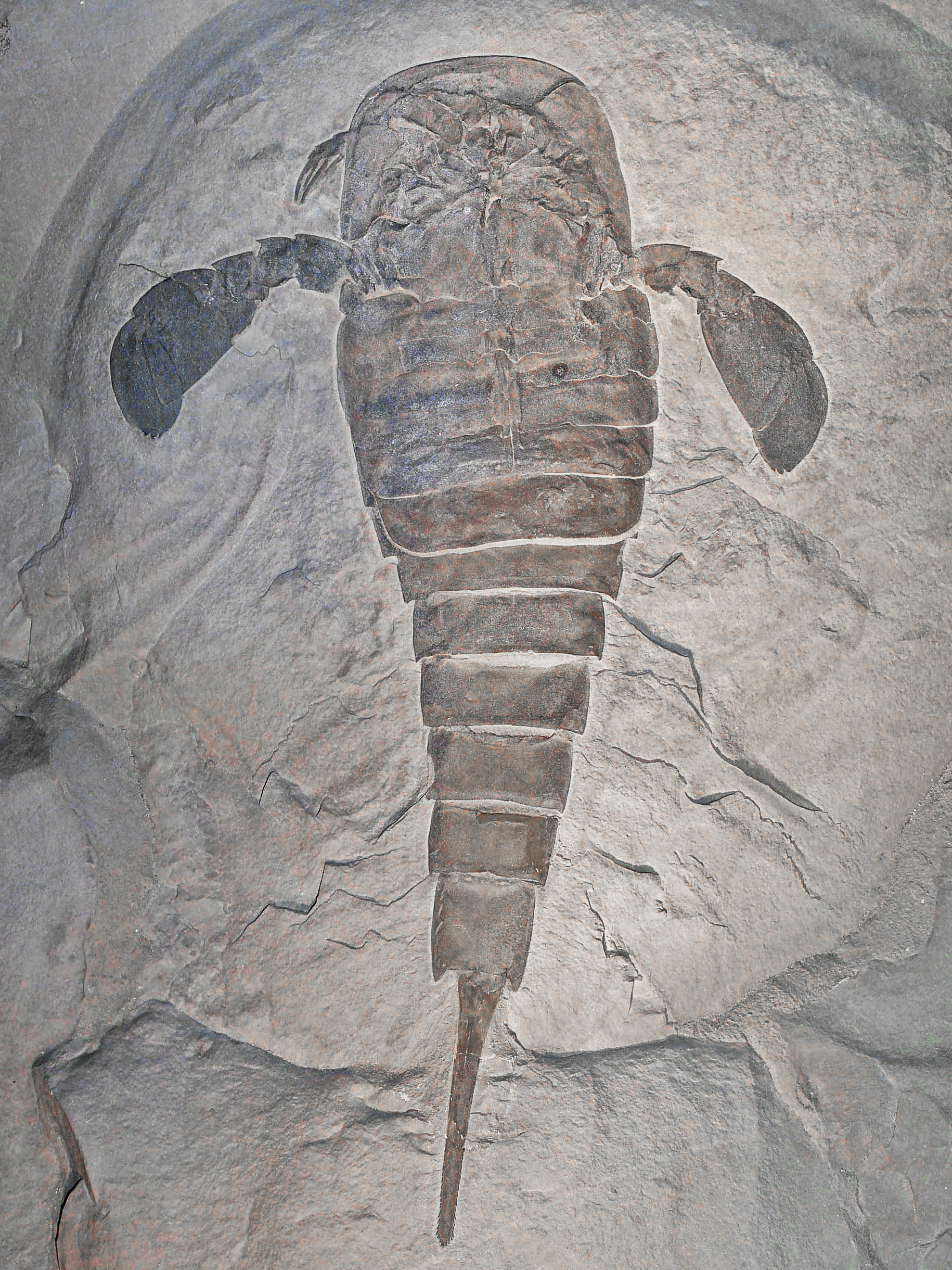
- Fossil specimen of Eurypterus remipes housed at the State Museum of Natural History Karlsruhe in Karlsruhe, Germany

Scientific classification
- Kingdom: Animalia
- Phylum: Arthropoda
- Subphylum: Chelicerata
- Clade: Sclerophorata
- Order: †Eurypterida; Huxley, 1857 (Note: Confusion exists in the literature over the taxonomic authorities of Eurypterida and the two suborders Eurypterina and Stylonurina. Nearly all authors over the course of the 20th and early 21st centuries considered Burmeister, 1843 to be the authority for the order Eurypterida. Burmeister named the family Eurypteridae in 1843, to encompass the genus Eurypterus. This attribution is incorrect, since the authority of family-level names do not apply to higher taxonomic group names (such as ordinal or class), even if the name is formed from the same stem (in this case, Eurypterus). Huxley, 1857 is the correct authority for Eurypterida, since Thomas Henry Huxley in 1857 was the first to use the name Eurypterida for the same taxonomic concept as the presently recognized grouping. Huxley used "Eurypterida" for an arthropod group of equivalent rank as Xiphosura and Trilobita, whereas Burmeister had used the family to contain only Eurypterus, and had understood it as a group of trilobites. The suborders Stylonurina and Eurypterina were first used as eurypterid suborders by Nestor Ivanovich Novozhilov in 1962, the correct taxonomic authority for both, though attributions have varied in later literature. The authority for Eurypterina has historically sometimes been given as Burmeister, 1843, through the same erroneous logic as for Eurypterida. Novozhilov himself erroneously considered the authority for Stylonurina to be Diener, 1924, the authority for the family Stylonuridae.)

Suborders
- †Eurypterina Novozhilov, 1962; †Stylonurina Novozhilov, 1962

Synonyms
- Gigantostraca Haeckel, 1866; Cyrtoctenida Størmer & Waterston, 1968

= Eurypterid =

Eurypterid Temporal range: Tremadocian-Roadian, 480–267 Ma Possible Jiangshanian and Changhsingian records

Order of arthropods (fossil)

Eurypterids, often informally called sea scorpions, are a group of extinct marine arthropods that form the order Eurypterida. The earliest known eurypterids date to the Tremadocian stage of the Ordovician period, 480 million years ago. The group is likely to have appeared first during the Late Cambrian period. With approximately 250 species, the Eurypterida is the most diverse Paleozoic chelicerate order. Following their appearance during the Ordovician, eurypterids became major components of marine faunas during the Silurian, from which the majority of eurypterid species have been described. The Silurian genus Eurypterus accounts for more than 90% of all known eurypterid specimens. Though the group continued to diversify during the subsequent Devonian period, the eurypterids were heavily affected by the Late Devonian extinction event. They declined in numbers and diversity during the Permian period, though their time of extinction remains contentious, argued to be either the early Middle Permian, or the Permian–Triassic extinction event 251.9 million years ago.

Although popularly called "sea scorpions", only the earliest eurypterids were marine; many later forms lived in brackish or fresh water, and they were not true scorpions. Some studies suggest that a dual respiratory system was present, which would have allowed for short periods of time in terrestrial environments. The name Eurypterida comes from Ancient Greek εὐρύς (eurús), meaning "wide, broad", and πτερόν (pterón), meaning "wing", referring to the pair of wide swimming appendages present in many members of the group.

The eurypterid order includes the largest known arthropods ever to have lived. The largest, Jaekelopterus, reached 2.5 meters (8.2 ft) in length. Eurypterids were not uniformly large and most species were less than 20 centimeters (8 in) long; the smallest eurypterid, Alkenopterus, was only 2.03 centimeters (0.80 in) long. Eurypterid fossils have been recovered from every continent. A majority of fossils are from fossil sites in North America and Europe because the group lived primarily in the waters around and within the ancient supercontinent of Laurasia. Only a handful of eurypterid groups spread beyond the confines of Euramerica and a few genera, such as Adelophthalmus and Pterygotus, achieved a cosmopolitan distribution with fossils being found worldwide.

== Description ==
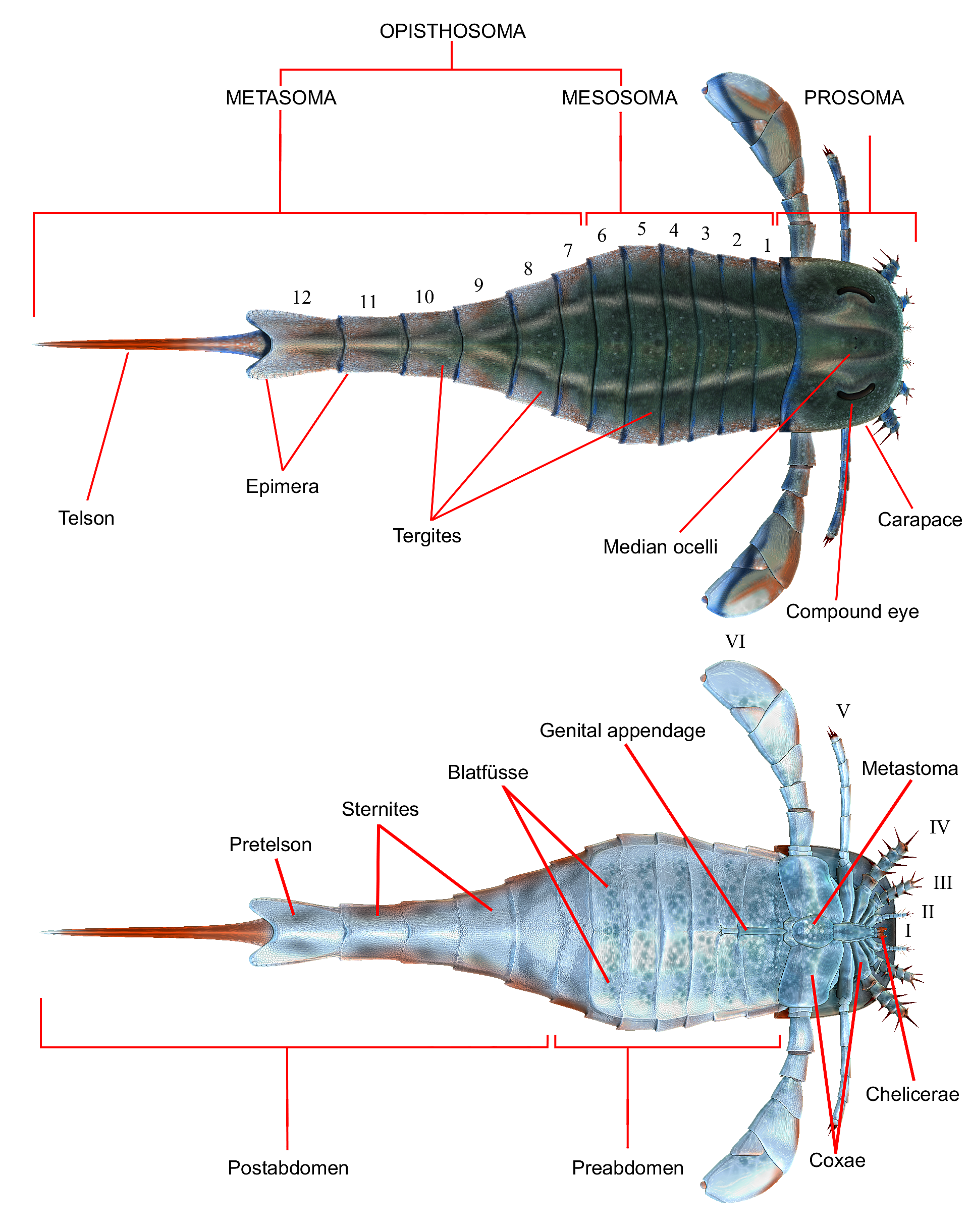
Restoration of Eurypterus with body parts labelled

Like all other arthropods, eurypterids possessed segmented bodies and jointed appendages (limbs) covered in a cuticle composed of proteins and chitin. As in other chelicerates, the body was divided into two tagmata (sections); the frontal prosoma (head) and posterior opisthosoma (abdomen). The prosoma was covered by a carapace (sometimes called the "prosomal shield") on which both compound eyes and the ocelli (simple eye-like sensory organs) were located.

The prosoma also bore six pairs of appendages which are usually referred to as appendage pairs I to VI. The first pair of appendages, the only pair placed before the mouth, is called the chelicerae (homologous to the fangs of spiders). They were equipped with small pincers used to manipulate food fragments and push them into the mouth. In one lineage, the Pterygotidae, the chelicerae were large and long, with strong, well-developed teeth on specialised chelae (claws). The subsequent pairs of appendages, numbers II to VI, possessed gnathobases (or "tooth-plates") on the coxae (limb segments) used for feeding. These appendages were generally walking legs that were cylindrical in shape and were covered in spines in some species. In most lineages, the limbs tended to get larger the farther back they were. In the Eurypterina suborder, the larger of the two eurypterid suborders, the sixth pair of appendages was also modified into a swimming paddle to aid in traversing aquatic environments.

The opisthosoma comprised 12 segments and the telson, the posteriormost division of the body, which in most species took the form of a blade-like shape. In some lineages, notably the Pterygotioidea, the Hibbertopteridae and the Mycteroptidae, the telson was flattened and may have been used as a rudder while swimming. Some genera within the superfamily Carcinosomatoidea, notably Eusarcana, had a telson similar to that of true scorpions and may even have been capable of using it to inject venom like them. The coxae of the sixth pair of appendages were overlaid by a plate that is referred to as the metastoma, originally derived from a complete exoskeleton segment. The opisthosoma itself can be divided either into a "mesosoma" (comprising segments 1 to 6) and "metasoma" (comprising segments 7 to 12) or into a "preabdomen" (generally comprising segments 1 to 7) and "postabdomen" (generally comprising segments 8 to 12).

The underside of the opisthosoma was covered in structures evolved from modified opisthosomal appendages. Throughout the opisthosoma, these structures formed plate-like structures termed Blattfüsse (lit. 'leaf-feet' in German). These created a branchial chamber (gill tract) between preceding Blattfüsse and the ventral surface of the opisthosoma itself, which contained the respiratory organs. The second to sixth opisthosomal segments also contained oval or triangular organs that have been interpreted as organs that aid in respiration. These organs, termed Kiemenplatten or "gill tracts", would potentially have aided eurypterids to breathe air above water, while Blattfüssen, similar to organs in modern horseshoe crabs, would cover the parts that serve for underwater respiration.

The appendages of opisthosomal segments 1 and 2 (the seventh and eighth segments overall) were fused into a structure termed the genital operculum, occupying most of the underside of the opisthosomal segment 2. Near the anterior margin of this structure, the genital appendage (also called the Zipfel or the median abdominal appendage) protruded. This appendage, often preserved very prominently, has consistently been interpreted as part of the reproductive system and occurs in two recognized types, assumed to correspond to male and female.

== Biology ==
=== Size ===
Size comparison of six of the largest eurypterids: Pterygotus grandidentatus, Pentecopterus decorahensis, Acutiramus macrophthalmus, A. bohemicus, Carcinosoma punctatum, and Jaekelopterus rhenaniae

Eurypterids were highly variable in size, depending on factors such as lifestyle, living environment and taxonomic affinity. Sizes around 100 centimeters (3.3 ft) are common in most eurypterid groups. The smallest eurypterid, Alkenopterus burglahrensis, measured just 2.03 centimeters (0.80 in) in length.

The largest eurypterid, and the largest known arthropod ever to have lived, is Jaekelopterus rhenaniae. A chelicera from the Emsian Klerf Formation of Willwerath, Germany measured 36.4 centimeters (14.3 in) in length, but is missing a quarter of its length, suggesting that the full chelicera would have been 45.5 centimeters (17.9 in) long. If the proportions between body length and chelicerae match those of its closest relatives, where the ratio between claw size and body length is relatively consistent, the specimen of Jaekelopterus that possessed the chelicera in question would have measured between 233 and 259 centimeters (7.64 and 8.50 ft), an average 2.5 meters (8.2 ft), in length. With the chelicerae extended, another meter (3.28 ft) would be added to this length. This estimate exceeds the maximum body size of all other known giant arthropods by almost half a meter (1.64 ft) even if the extended chelicerae are not included. Two other eurypterids have also been estimated to have reached lengths of 2.5 metres; Erettopterus grandis (closely related to Jaekelopterus) and Hibbertopterus wittebergensis, but E. grandis is very fragmentary and the H. wittenbergensis size estimate is based on trackway evidence, not fossil remains.

The family of Jaekelopterus, the Pterygotidae, is noted for several unusually large species. Both Acutiramus, whose largest member A. bohemicus measured 2.1 meters (6.9 ft), and Pterygotus, whose largest species P. grandidentatus measured 1.75 meters (5.7 ft), were gigantic. Several different contributing factors to the large size of the pterygotids have been suggested, including courtship behaviour, predation and competition over environmental resources.

Giant eurypterids were not limited to the family Pterygotidae. An isolated 12.7 centimeters (5.0 in) long fossil metastoma of the carcinosomatoid eurypterid Carcinosoma punctatum indicates the animal would have reached a length of 2.2 meters (7.2 ft) in life, rivalling the pterygotids in size. Another giant was Pentecopterus decorahensis, a primitive carcinosomatoid, which is estimated to have reached lengths of 1.7 meters (5.6 ft).

Typical of large eurypterids is a lightweight build. Factors such as locomotion, energy costs in molting and respiration, as well as the actual physical properties of the exoskeleton, limit the size that arthropods can reach. A lightweight construction significantly decreases the influence of these factors. Pterygotids were particularly lightweight, with most fossilized large body segments preserving as thin and unmineralized. Lightweight adaptations are present in other giant paleozoic arthropods as well, such as the giant millipede Arthropleura, and are possibly vital for the evolution of giant size in arthropods.

In addition to the lightweight giant eurypterids, some deep-bodied forms in the family Hibbertopteridae were also very large. A carapace from the Carboniferous of Scotland referred to the species Hibbertoperus scouleri measures 65 cm (26 in) wide. As Hibbertopterus was very wide compared to its length, the animal in question could possibly have measured just short of 2 meters (6.6 ft) in length. More robust than the pterygotids, this giant Hibbertopterus would possibly have rivalled the largest pterygotids in weight, if not surpassed them, and as such be among the heaviest arthropods.

=== Locomotion ===
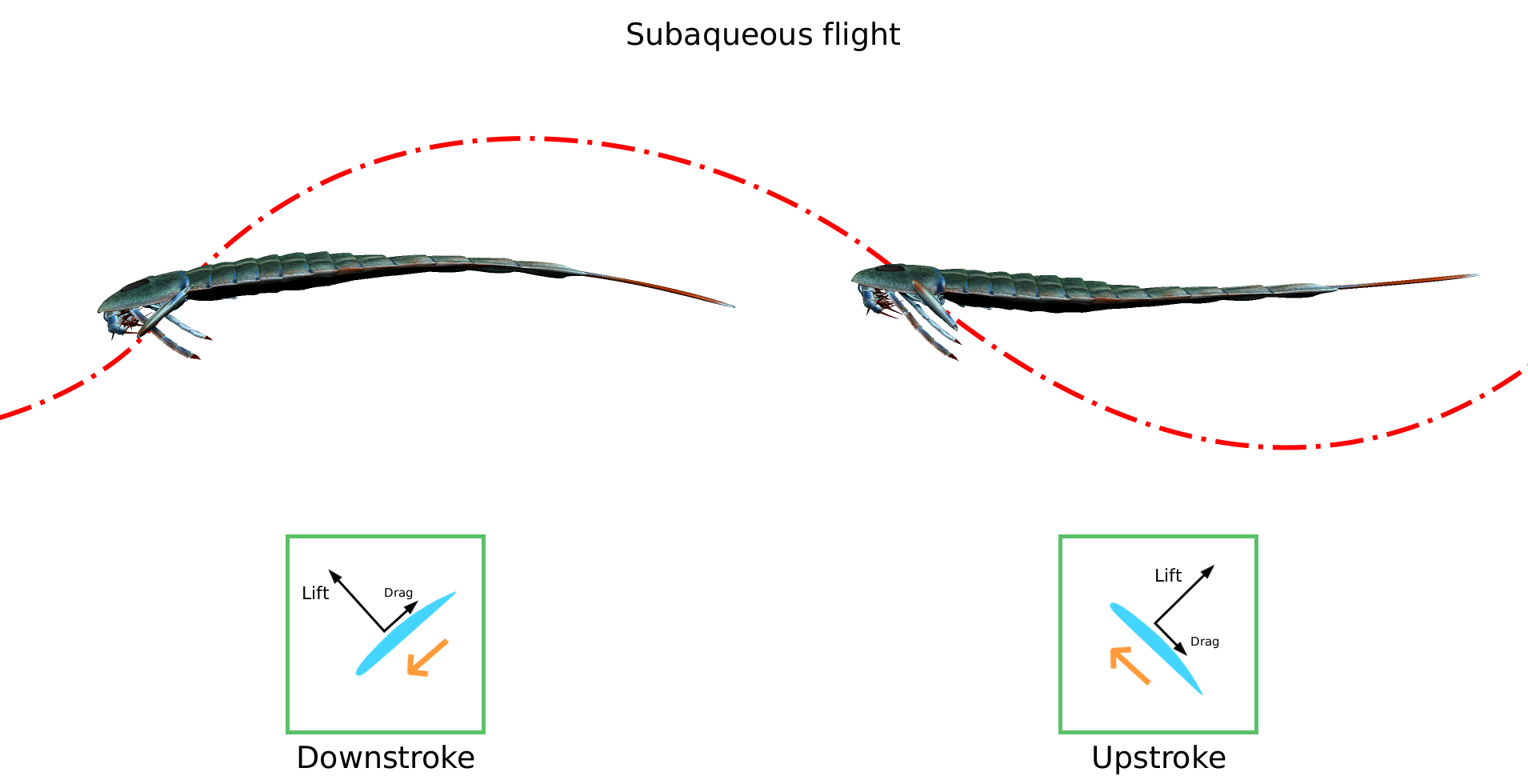
Illustration of subaqueous flight in Eurypterus in which the shape of the paddles and their motion through water is enough to generate lift. This type of locomotion was limited to eurypterine (with swimming paddles) eurypterids.

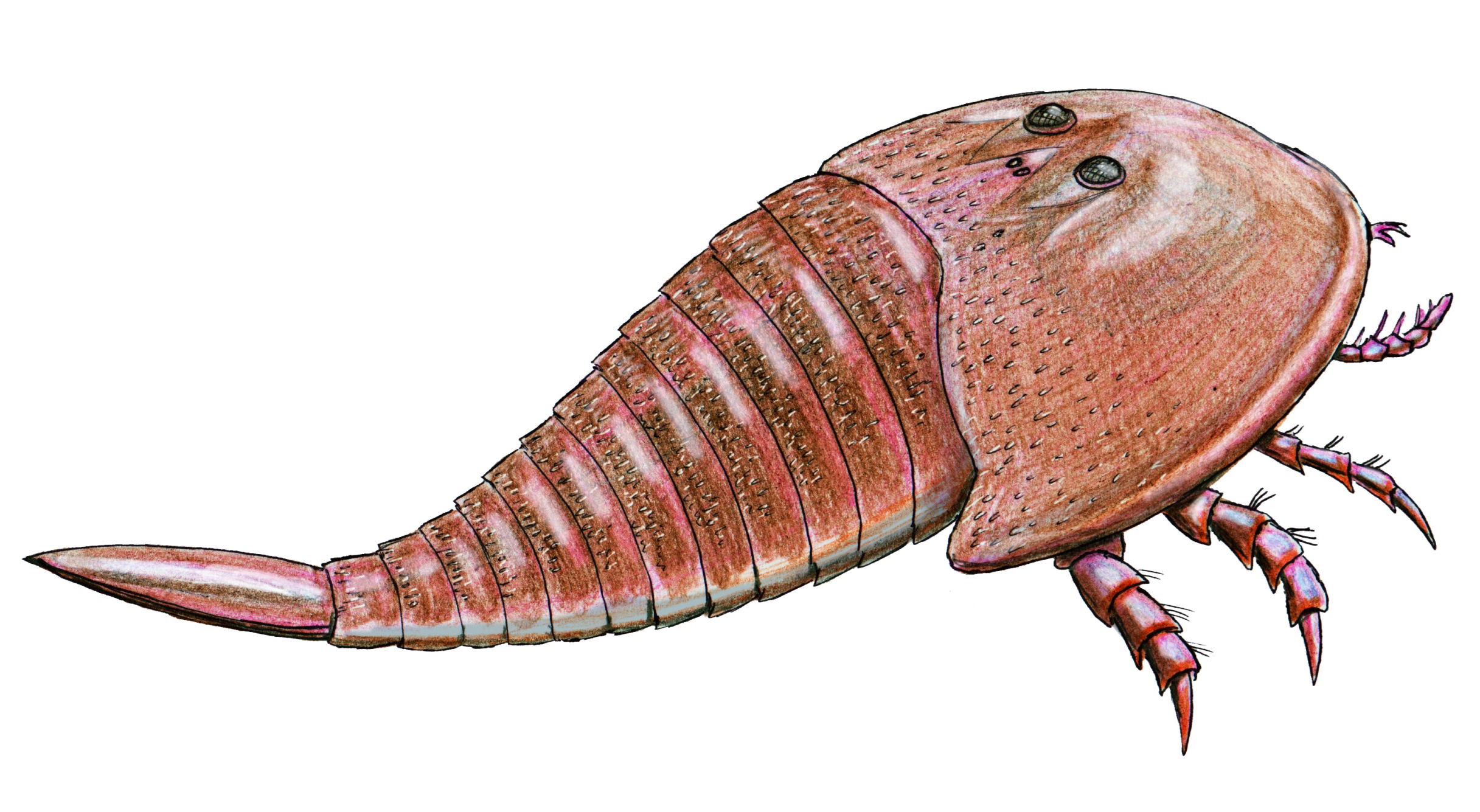
Illustration of Hibbertopterus, a large stylonurine (lacking swimming paddles) eurypterid

The two eurypterid suborders, Eurypterina and Stylonurina, are distinguished primarily by the morphology of their final pair of appendages. In the Stylonurina, this appendage takes the form of a long and slender walking leg, while in the Eurypterina, the leg is modified and broadened into a swimming paddle. Other than the swimming paddle, the legs of many eurypterines were far too small to do much more than allow them to crawl across the sea floor. In contrast, a number of stylonurines had elongated and powerful legs that might have allowed them to walk on land (similar to modern crabs).

A fossil trackway was discovered in Carboniferous-aged fossil deposits of Scotland in 2005. It was attributed to the stylonurine eurypterid Hibbertopterus due to a matching size (the trackmaker was estimated to have been about 1.6 meters (5.2 ft) long) and inferred leg anatomy. It is the largest terrestrial trackway—measuring 6 meters (20 ft) long and averaging 95 centimeters (3.12 ft) in width—made by an arthropod found thus far. It is the first record of land locomotion by a eurypterid. The trackway provides evidence that some eurypterids could survive in terrestrial environments, at least for short periods of time, and reveals information about the stylonurine gait. In Hibbertopterus, as in most eurypterids, the pairs of appendages are different in size (referred to as a heteropodous limb condition). These differently sized pairs would have moved in phase, and the short stride length indicates that Hibbertopterus crawled with an exceptionally slow speed, at least on land. The large telson was dragged along the ground and left a large central groove behind the animal. Slopes in the tracks at random intervals suggest that the motion was jerky. The gait of smaller stylonurines, such as Parastylonurus, was probably faster and more precise.

The functionality of the eurypterine swimming paddles varied from group to group. In the Eurypteroidea, the paddles were similar in shape to oars. The condition of the joints in their appendages ensured their paddles could only be moved in near-horizontal planes, not upwards or downwards. Some other groups, such as the Pterygotioidea, would not have possessed this condition and were probably able to swim faster. Most eurypterines are generally agreed to have utilized a rowing type of propulsion similar to that of crabs and water beetles. Larger individuals may have been capable of underwater flying (or subaqueous flight) in which the motion and shape of the paddles are enough to generate lift, similar to the swimming of sea turtles and sea lions. This type of movement has a relatively slower acceleration rate than the rowing type, especially since adults have proportionally smaller paddles than juveniles. However, since the larger sizes of adults mean a higher drag coefficient, using this type of propulsion is more energy-efficient.

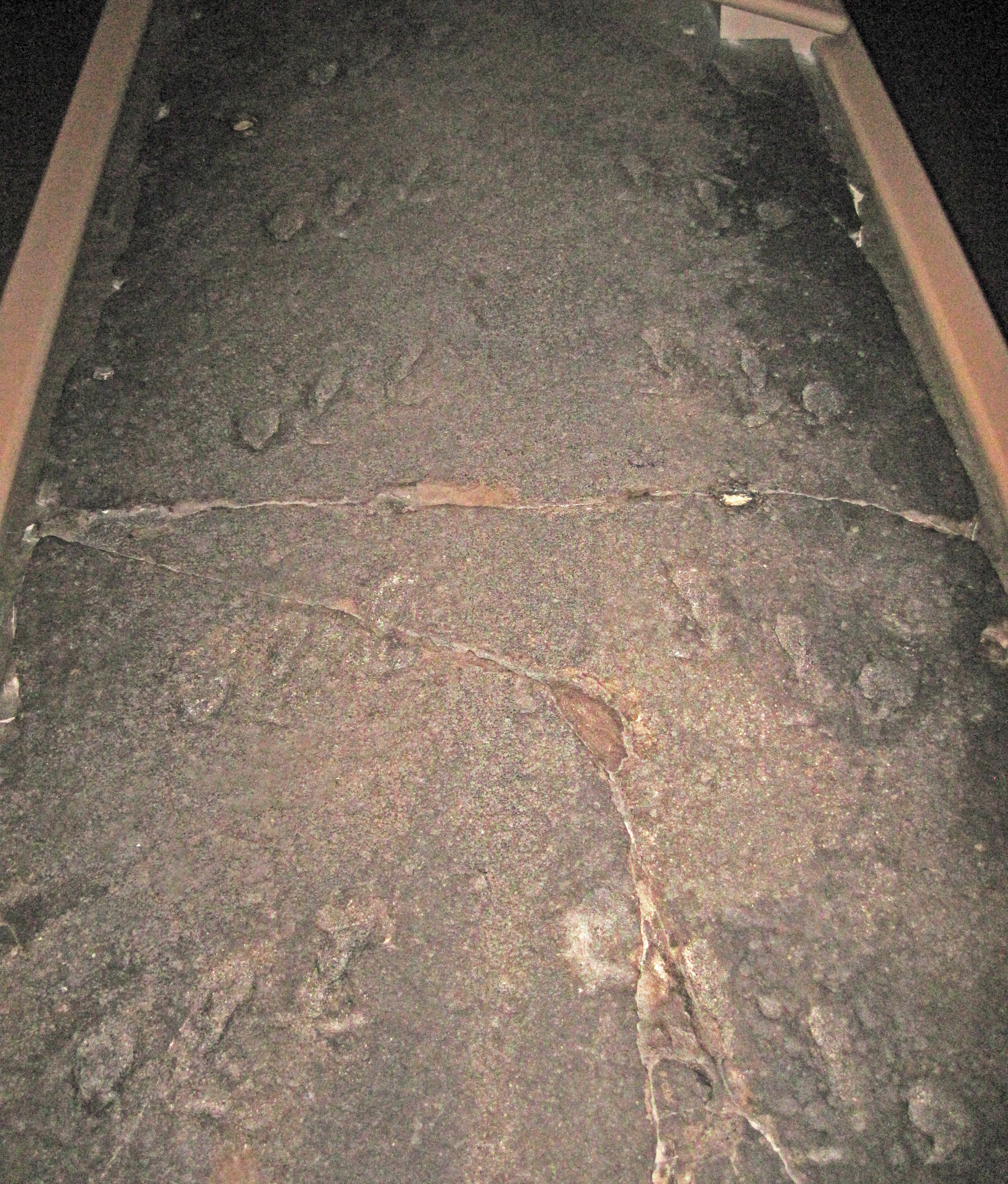
The holotype of Palmichnium kosinkiorum, containing the largest eurypterid footprints known

Some eurypterines, such as Mixopterus (as inferred from attributed fossil trackways), were not necessarily good swimmers. It likely kept mostly to the bottom, using its swimming paddles for occasional bursts of movements vertically, with the fourth and fifth pairs of appendages positioned backwards to produce minor movement forwards. While walking, it probably used a gait like that of most modern insects. The weight of its long abdomen would have been balanced by two heavy and specialized frontal appendages, and the center of gravity might have been adjustable by raising and positioning the tail.

Preserved fossilized eurypterid trackways tend to be large and heteropodous and often have an associated telson drag mark along the mid-line (as with the Scottish Hibbertopterus track). Such trackways have been discovered on every continent except for South America. In some places where eurypterid fossil remains are otherwise rare, such as in South Africa and the rest of the former supercontinent Gondwana, the discoveries of trackways both predate and outnumber eurypterid body fossils. Eurypterid trackways have been referred to several ichnogenera, most notably Palmichnium (defined as a series of four tracks often with an associated drag mark in the mid-line), wherein the holotype of the ichnospecies P. kosinkiorum preserves the largest eurypterid footprints known to date with the found tracks each being about 7.6 centimeters (3.0 in) in diameter. Other eurypterid ichnogenera include Merostomichnites (though it is likely that many specimens actually represent trackways of crustaceans) and Arcuites (which preserves grooves made by the swimming appendages).

=== Respiration ===
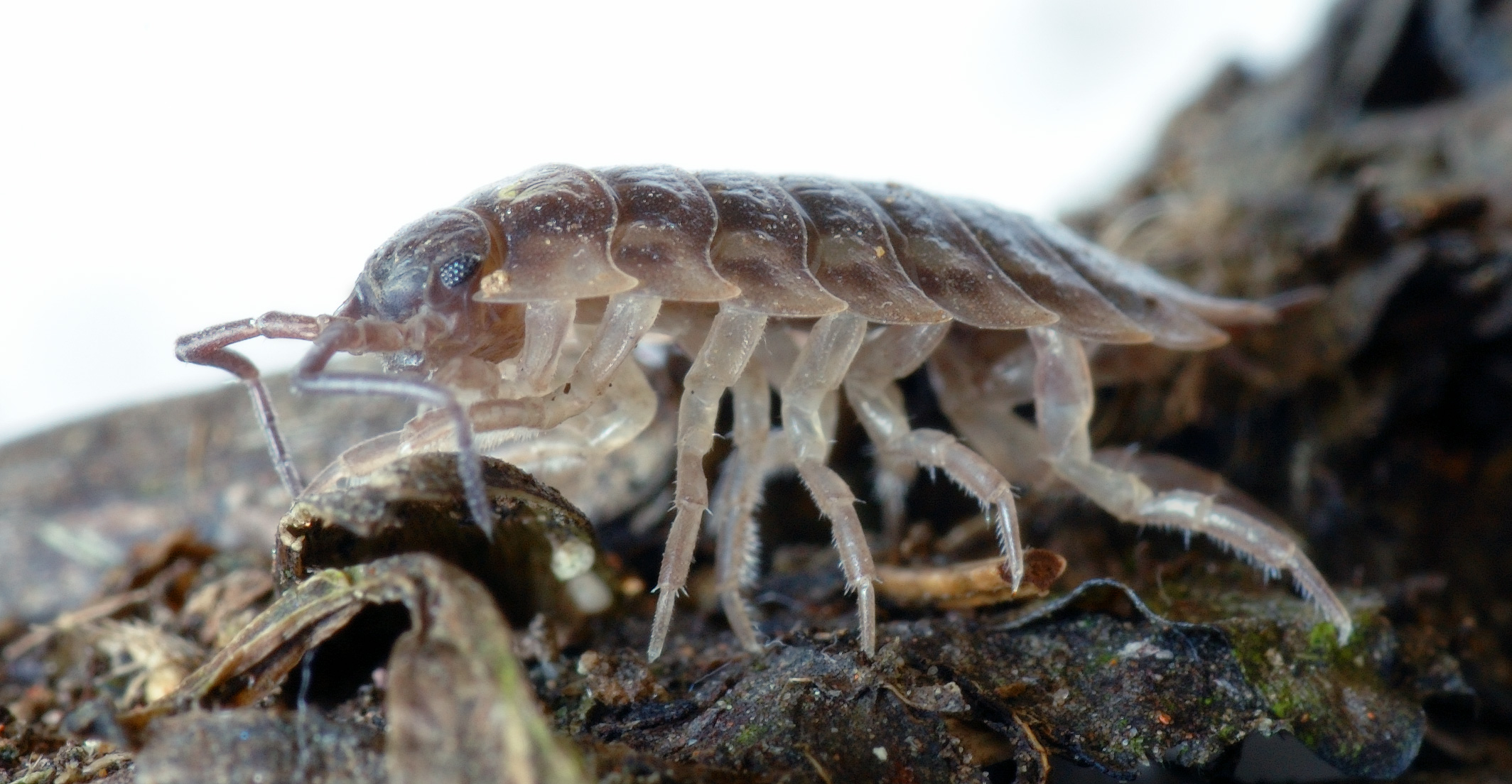
The supposed "gill tracts" of eurypterids have been compared to the air-breathing pseudotracheae present in the posterior legs of modern isopods, such as Oniscus (pictured).

In eurypterids, the respiratory organs were located on the ventral body wall (the underside of the opisthosoma). Blattfüsse, evolved from opisthosomal appendages, covered the underside and created a gill chamber where the "gill tracts" were located. Depending on the species, the eurypterid gill tract was either triangular or oval in shape and was possibly raised into a cushion-like state. The surface of this gill tract bore several spinules (small spines), which resulted in an enlarged surface area. It was composed of spongy tissue due to many invaginations in the structure.

Though the Kiemenplatte is referred to as a "gill tract", it may not necessarily have functioned as actual gills. In other animals, gills are used for oxygen uptake from water and are outgrowths of the body wall. Despite eurypterids clearly being primarily aquatic animals that almost certainly evolved underwater (some eurypterids, such as the pterygotids, would even have been physically unable to walk on land), it is unlikely the "gill tract" contained functional gills when comparing the organ to gills in other invertebrates and even fish. Previous interpretations often identified the eurypterid "gills" as homologous with those of other groups (hence the terminology), with gas exchange occurring within the spongy tract and a pattern of branchio-cardiac and dendritic veins (as in related groups) carrying oxygenated blood into the body. The primary analogy used in previous studies has been horseshoe crabs, though their gill structure and that of eurypterids are remarkably different. In horseshoe crabs, the gills are more complex and composed of many lamellae (plates) which give a larger surface area used for gas exchange. In addition, the gill tract of eurypterids is proportionally much too small to support them if it is analogous to the gills of other groups. To be functional gills, they would have to have been highly efficient and would have required a highly efficient circulatory system. It is considered unlikely, however, that these factors would be enough to explain the large discrepancy between gill tract size and body size.

It has been suggested instead that the "gill tract" was an organ for breathing air, perhaps actually being a lung, plastron or a pseudotrachea. Plastrons are organs that some arthropods evolved secondarily to breathe air underwater. This is considered an unlikely explanation since eurypterids had evolved in water from the start and they would not have organs evolved from air-breathing organs present. In addition, plastrons are generally exposed on outer parts of the body while the eurypterid gill tract is located behind the Blattfüssen. Instead, among arthropod respiratory organs, the eurypterid gill tracts most closely resemble the pseudotracheae found in modern isopods. These organs, called pseudotracheae, because of some resemblance to the tracheae (windpipes) of air-breathing organisms, are lung-like and present within the pleopods (back legs) of isopods. The structure of the pseudotracheae has been compared to the spongy structure of the eurypterid gill tracts. It is possible the two organs functioned in the same way.

Some researchers have suggested that eurypterids may have been adapted to an amphibious lifestyle, using the full gill tract structure as gills and the invaginations within it as pseudotrachea. This mode of life may not have been physiologically possible, however, since water pressure would have forced water into the invaginations leading to asphyxiation. Furthermore, most eurypterids would have been aquatic their entire lives. No matter how much time was spent on land, organs for respiration in underwater environments must have been present. True gills, expected to have been located within the branchial chamber within the Blattfüssen, remain unknown in eurypterids.

=== Ontogeny ===
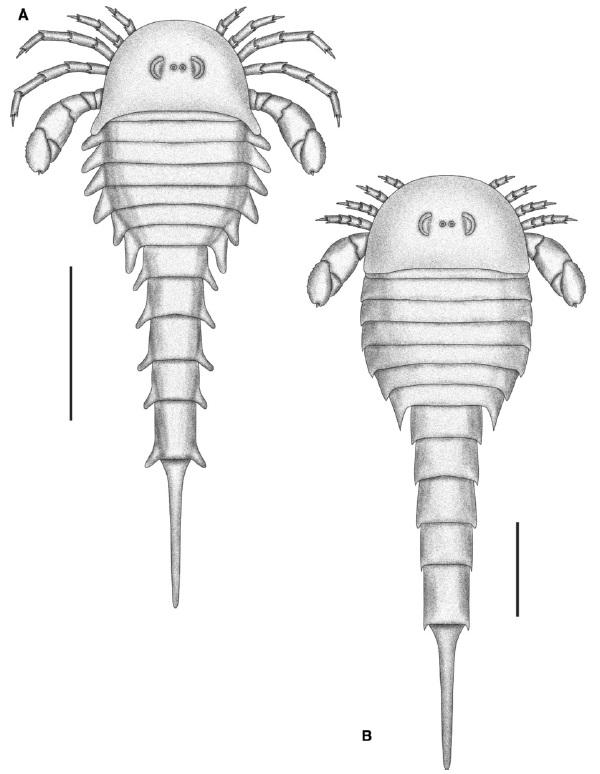
Larval (left) and juvenile (right) instars of Strobilopterus (not to scale)

Like all arthropods, eurypterids matured and grew through static developmental stages referred to as instars. These instars were punctuated by periods during which eurypterids went through ecdysis (molting of the cuticle) after which they underwent rapid and immediate growth. Some arthropods, such as insects and many crustaceans, undergo extreme changes over the course of maturing. Chelicerates, including eurypterids, are in general considered to be direct developers, undergoing no extreme changes after hatching (though extra body segments and extra limbs may be gained over the course of ontogeny in some lineages, such as xiphosurans and sea spiders). Whether eurypterids were true direct developers (with hatchlings more or less being identical to adults) or hemianamorphic direct developers (with extra segments and limbs potentially being added during ontogeny) has been controversial in the past.

Hemianamorphic direct development has been observed in many arthropod groups, such as trilobites, megacheirans, basal crustaceans and basal myriapods. True direct development has on occasion been referred to as a trait unique to arachnids. There have been few studies on eurypterid ontogeny as there is a general lack of specimens in the fossil record that can confidently be stated to represent juveniles. It is possible that many eurypterid species thought to be distinct actually represent juvenile specimens of other species, with paleontologists rarely considering the influence of ontogeny when describing new species.

Studies on a well-preserved fossil assemblage of eurypterids from the Pragian-aged Beartooth Butte Formation in Cottonwood Canyon, Wyoming, composed of multiple specimens of various developmental stages of eurypterids Jaekelopterus and Strobilopterus, revealed that eurypterid ontogeny was more or less parallel and similar to that of extinct and extant xiphosurans, with the largest exception being that eurypterids hatched with a full set of appendages and opisthosomal segments. Eurypterids were thus not hemianamorphic direct developers, but true direct developers like modern arachnids.

The most frequently observed change occurring through ontogeny (except for some genera, such as Eurypterus, which appear to have been static) is the metastoma becoming proportionally less wide. This ontogenetic change has been observed in members of several superfamilies, such as the Eurypteroidea, the Pterygotioidea and the Moselopteroidea.

=== Feeding ===
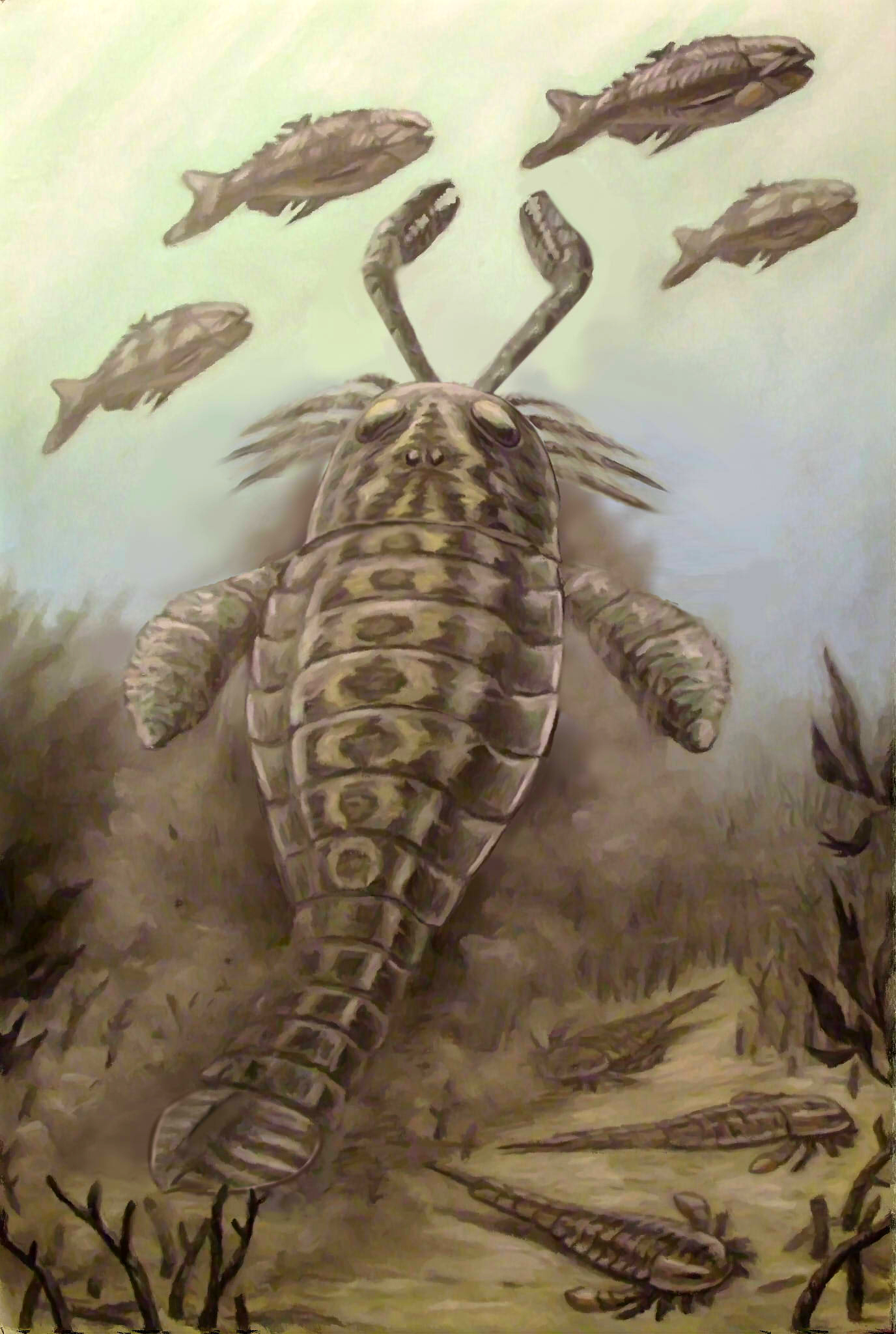
Pterygotus depicted hunting Birkenia

No fossil gut contents from eurypterids are known, so direct evidence of their diet is lacking. The eurypterid biology is particularly suggestive of a carnivorous lifestyle. Not only were many large (in general, most predators tend to be larger than their prey), but they had stereoscopic vision (the ability to perceive depth). The legs of many eurypterids were covered in thin spines, used both for locomotion and the gathering of food. In some groups, these spiny appendages became heavily specialized. In some eurypterids in the Carcinosomatoidea, forward-facing appendages were large and possessed enormously elongated spines (as in Mixopterus and Megalograptus). In derived members of the Pterygotioidea, the appendages were completely without spines, but had specialized claws instead. Other eurypterids, lacking these specialized appendages, likely fed in a manner similar to modern horseshoe crabs, by grabbing and shredding food with their appendages before pushing it into their mouth using their chelicerae.

Fossils preserving digestive tracts have been reported from fossils of various eurypterids, among them Carcinosoma, Acutiramus and Eurypterus. Though a potential anal opening has been reported from the telson of a specimen of Buffalopterus, it is more likely that the anus was opened through the thin cuticle between the last segment before the telson and the telson itself, as in modern horseshoe crabs.

Eurypterid coprolites discovered in deposits of Ordovician age in Ohio containing fragments of a trilobite and eurypterid Megalograptus ohioensis in association with full specimens of the same eurypterid species have been suggested to represent evidence of cannibalism. Similar coprolites referred to the species Lanarkopterus dolichoschelus from the Ordovician of Ohio contain fragments of jawless fish and fragments of smaller specimens of Lanarkopterus itself.

Though apex predatory roles would have been limited to the very largest eurypterids, smaller eurypterids were likely formidable predators in their own right just like their larger relatives.

=== Reproductive biology ===
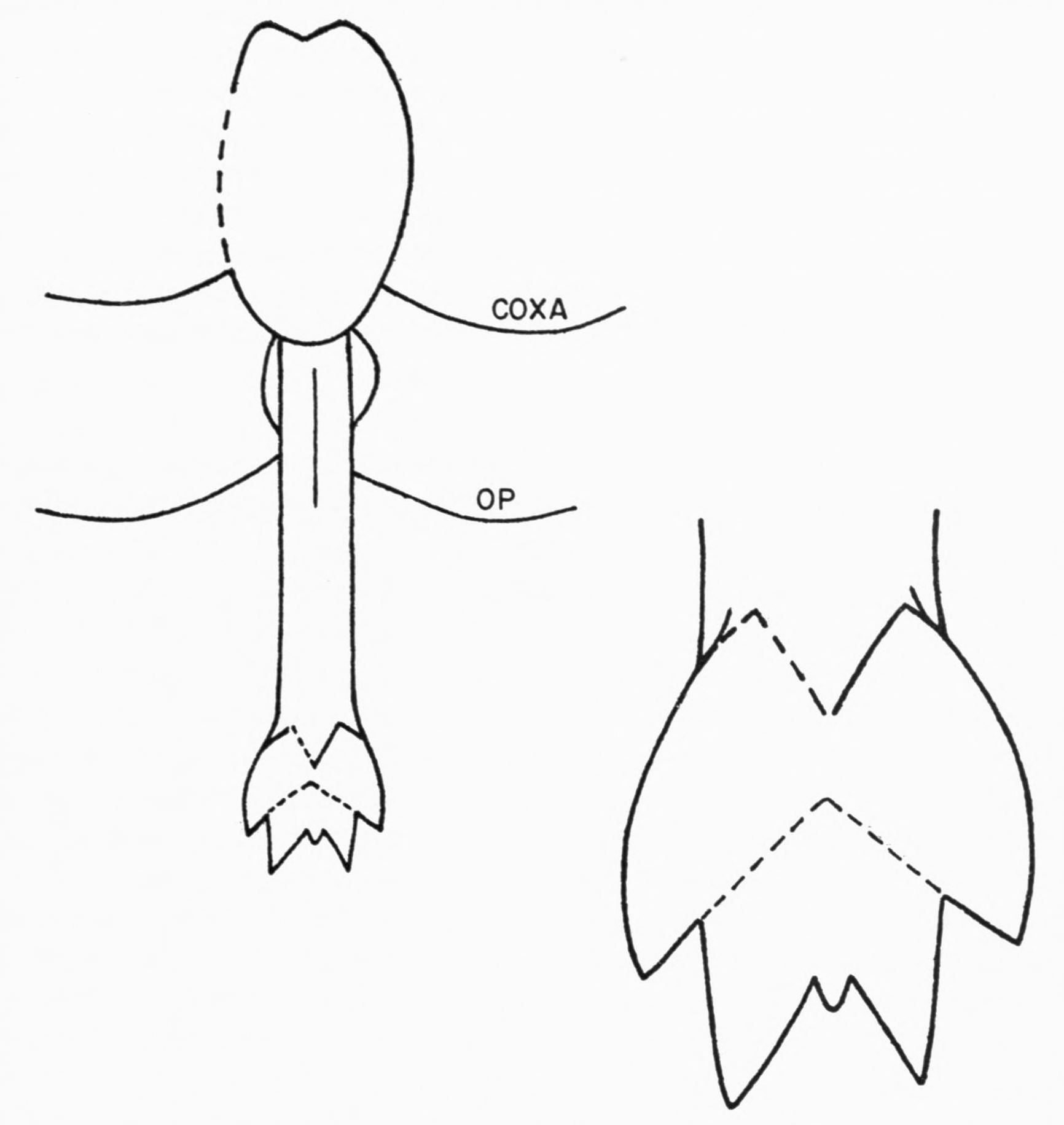
Type A genital appendage of Adelophthalmus mansfieldi

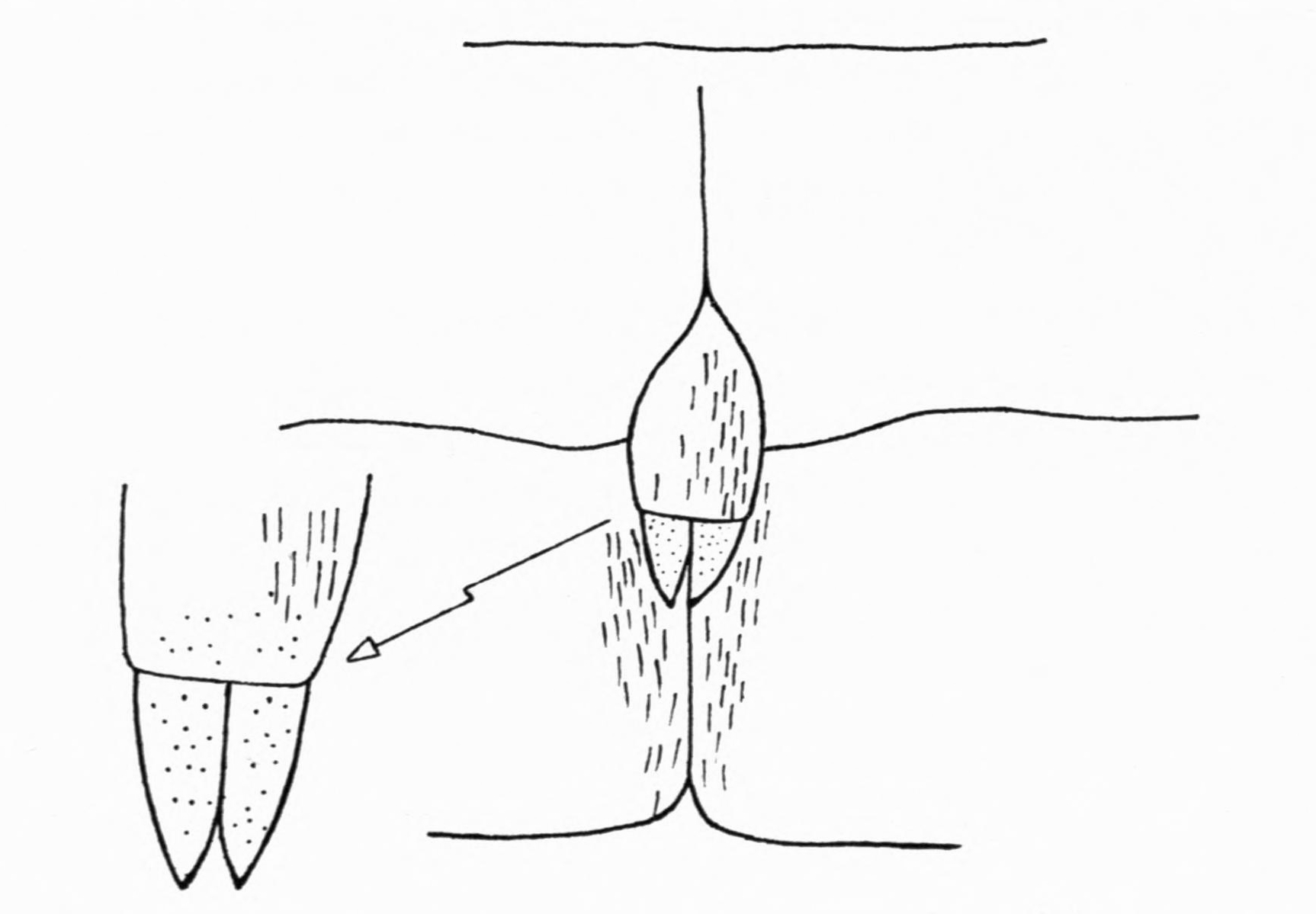
Type B genital appendage of Kokomopterus longicaudatus

As in many other entirely extinct groups, understanding and researching the reproduction and sexual dimorphism of eurypterids is difficult, as they are only known from fossilized shells and carapaces. In some cases, there might not be enough apparent differences to separate the sexes based on morphology alone. Sometimes two sexes of the same species have been interpreted as two different species, as was the case with two species of Drepanopterus (D. bembycoides and D. lobatus).

The eurypterid prosoma is made up of the first six exoskeleton segments fused together into a larger structure. The seventh segment (thus the first opisthosomal segment) is referred to as the metastoma and the eighth segment (distinctly plate-like) is called the operculum and contains the genital aperature. The underside of this segment is occupied by the genital operculum, a structure originally evolved from ancestral seventh and eighth pair of appendages. In its center, as in modern horseshoe crabs, is a genital appendage. This appendage, an elongated rod with an internal duct, is found in two distinct morphs, generally referred to as "type A" and "type B". These genital appendages are often preserved prominently in fossils and have been the subject of various interpretations of eurypterid reproduction and sexual dimorphism.

Type A appendages are generally longer than those of type B. In some genera they are divided into different numbers of sections, such as in Eurypterus where the type A appendage is divided into three but the type B appendage into only two. Such division of the genital appendage is common in eurypterids, but the number is not universal; for instance, the appendages of both types in the family Pterygotidae are undivided. The type A appendage is also armed with two curved spines called furca (lit. 'fork' in Latin). The presence of furca in the type B appendage is also possible and the structure may represent the unfused tips of the appendages. Located between the dorsal and ventral surfaces of the Blattfüsse associated with the type A appendages is a set of organs traditionally described as either "tubular organs" or "horn organs". These organs are most often interpreted as spermathecae (organs for storing sperm), though this function is yet to be proven conclusively. In arthropods, spermathecae are used to store the spermatophore received from males. This would imply that the type A appendage is the female morph and the type B appendage is the male. Further evidence for the type A appendages representing the female morph of genital appendages comes in their more complex construction (a general trend for female arthropod genitalia). It is possible that the greater length of the type A appendage means that it was used as an ovipositor (used to deposit eggs). The different types of genital appendages are not necessarily the only feature that distinguishes between the sexes of eurypterids. Depending on the genus and species in question, other features such as size, the amount of ornamentation, and the proportional width of the body can be the result of sexual dimorphism. In general, eurypterids with type B appendages (males) appear to have been proportionally wider than eurypterids with type A appendages (females) of the same genera.

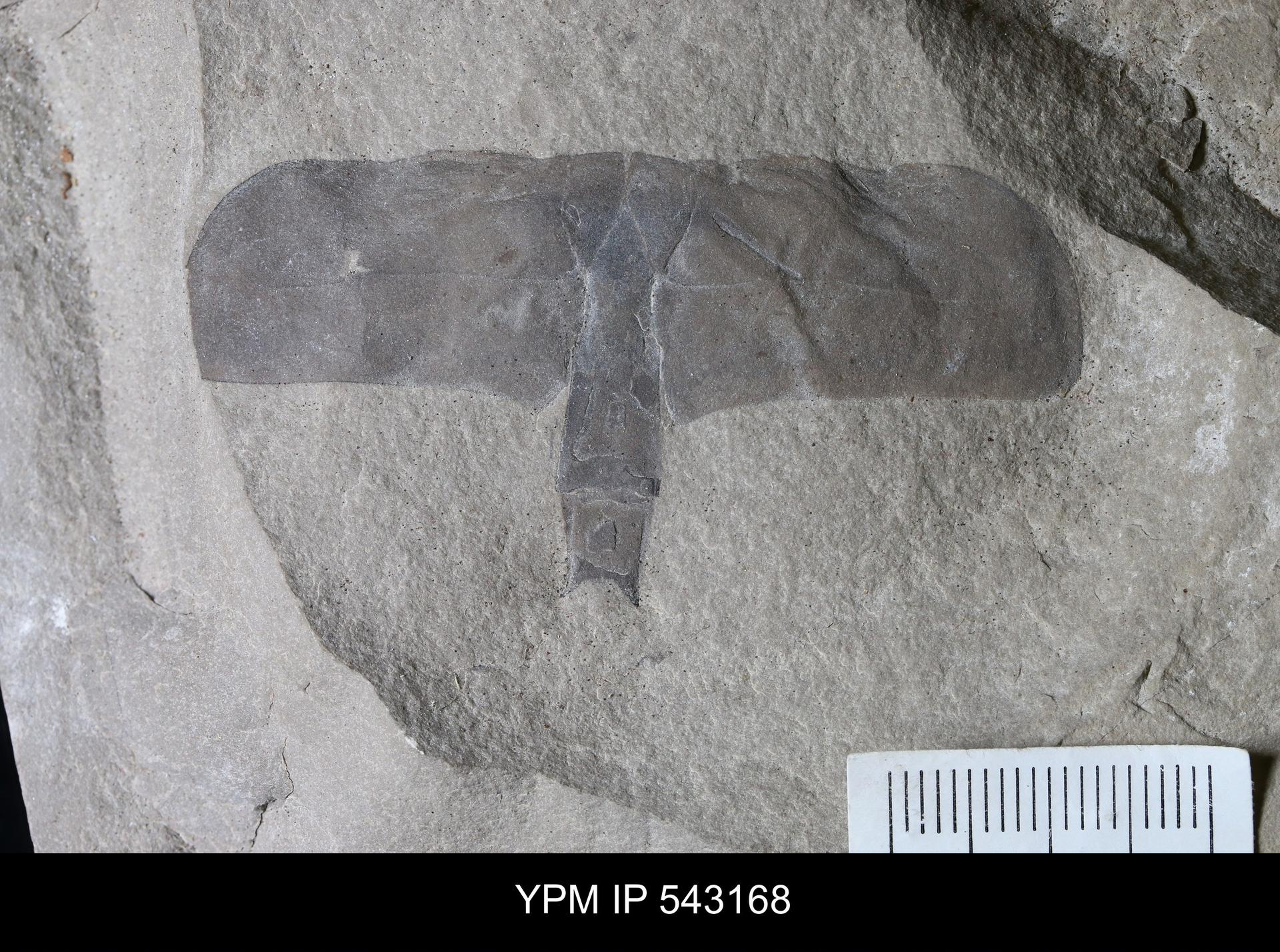
Type A genital appendage of Eurypterus sp.

The primary function of the long, assumed female, type A appendages was likely to take up spermatophore from the substrate into the reproductive tract rather than to serve as an ovipositor, as arthropod ovipositors are generally longer than eurypterid type A appendages. By rotating the sides of the operculum, it would have been possible to lower the appendage from the body. Due to the way different plates overlay at its location, the appendage would have been impossible to move without muscular contractions moving around the operculum. It would have been kept in place when not it use. The furca on the type A appendages may have aided in breaking open the spermatophore to release the free sperm inside for uptake. The "horn organs," possibly spermathecae, are thought to have been connected directly to the appendage via tracts, but these supposed tracts remain unpreserved in available fossil material.

Type B appendages, assumed male, would have produced, stored and perhaps shaped spermatophore in a heart-shaped structure on the dorsal surface of the appendage. A broad genital opening would have allowed large amounts of spermatophore to be released at once. The long furca associated with type B appendages, perhaps capable of being lowered like the type A appendage, could have been used to detect whether a substrate was suitable for spermatophore deposition.

== Evolutionary history ==
=== Origins ===
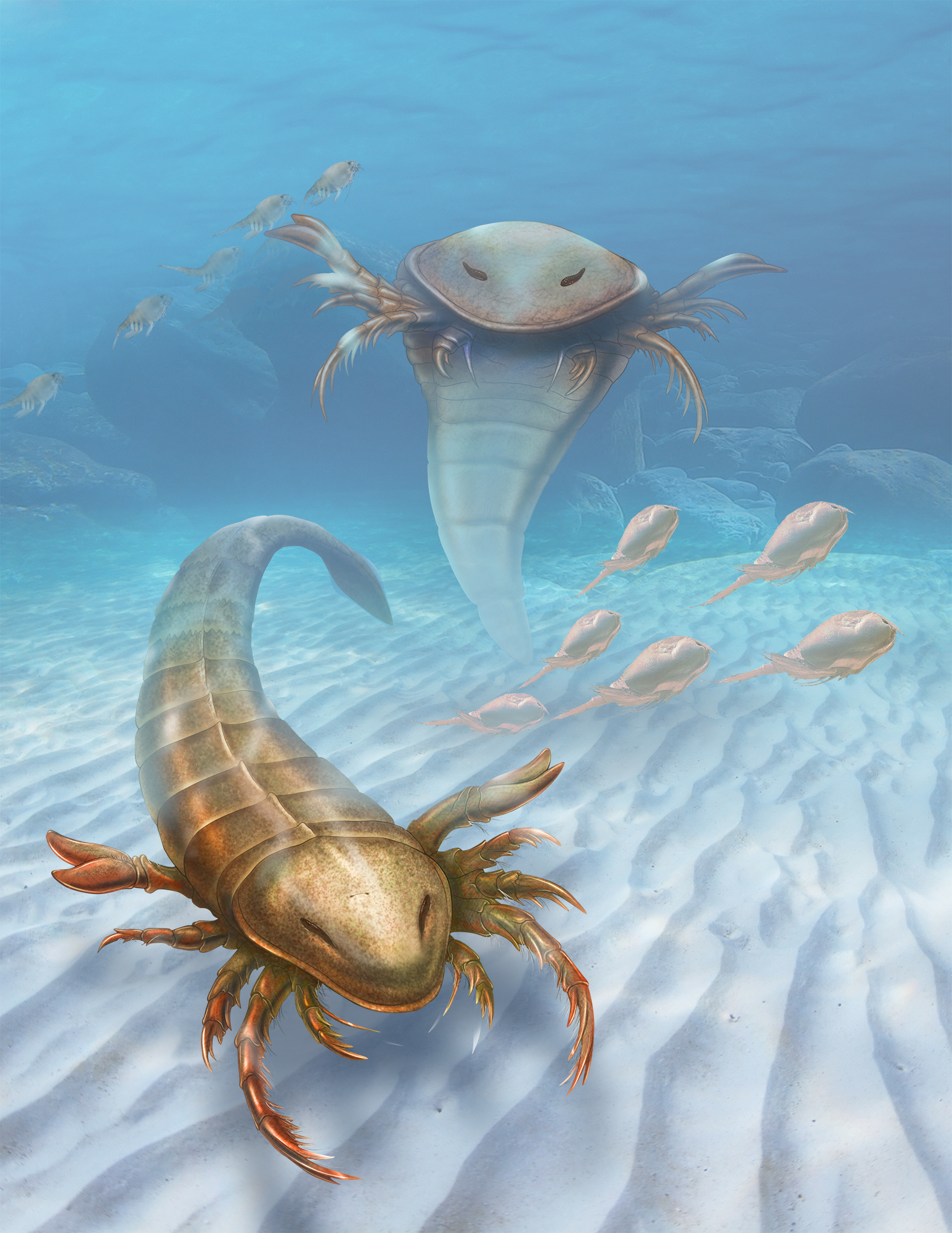
A reconstruction of Pentecopterus, one of the earliest known eurypterids. The family to which Pentecopterus belongs, the Megalograptidae, was the first truly successful eurypterid group.

Until 1882 no eurypterids were known from before the Silurian. Contemporary discoveries since the 1880s have expanded the knowledge of early eurypterids from the Ordovician period. The (formerly) earliest eurypterid known today, the megalograptid Pentecopterus, dates from the Darriwilian stage of the Middle Ordovician, 467.3 million years ago. However, appendages from the even earlier Fezouata Formation have been described as the species ?Carcinosoma aurorae, providing the first incontrovertible evidence of Tremadocian eurypterids.

Pentecopterus was a relatively derived eurypterid, part of the megalograptid family within the carcinosomatoid superfamily, alongside the carcinosomatid Carcinosoma aurora. Their derived position suggests that most eurypterid clades, at least within the eurypterine suborder, had already been established at this point during the Early Ordovician. The earliest known stylonurine eurypterid, Brachyopterus, is also Middle Ordovician in age. The presence of members of both suborders indicates that primitive stem-eurypterids would have preceded them, though these are so far unknown in the fossil record. The presence of several eurypterid clades during the Middle Ordovician suggests that eurypterid originated during the Cambrian period.

As such, the exact eurypterid time of origin remains unknown. Though fossils referred to as "primitive eurypterids" have occasionally been described from deposits of Cambrian or even Precambrian age, they are not recognized as eurypterids, and sometimes not even as related forms, today. Some animals previously seen as primitive eurypterids, such as the genus Strabops from the Cambrian of Missouri, are now classified as aglaspidids or strabopids. The aglaspidids, once seen as primitive chelicerates, are now seen as a group more closely related to trilobites.

The fossil record of Ordovician eurypterids is quite poor. The majority of eurypterids once reportedly known from the Ordovician have since proven to be misidentifications or pseudofossils. Today only 11 species can be confidently identified as representing Ordovician eurypterids. These taxa fall into two distinct ecological categories; large and active predators from the ancient continent of Laurentia, and demersal (living on the seafloor) and basal animals from the continents Avalonia and Gondwana. The Laurentian predators, classified in the family Megalograptidae (comprising the genera Echinognathus, Megalograptus and Pentecopterus), are likely to represent the first truly successful eurypterid group, experiencing a small radiation during the Late Ordovician.

=== Silurian ===
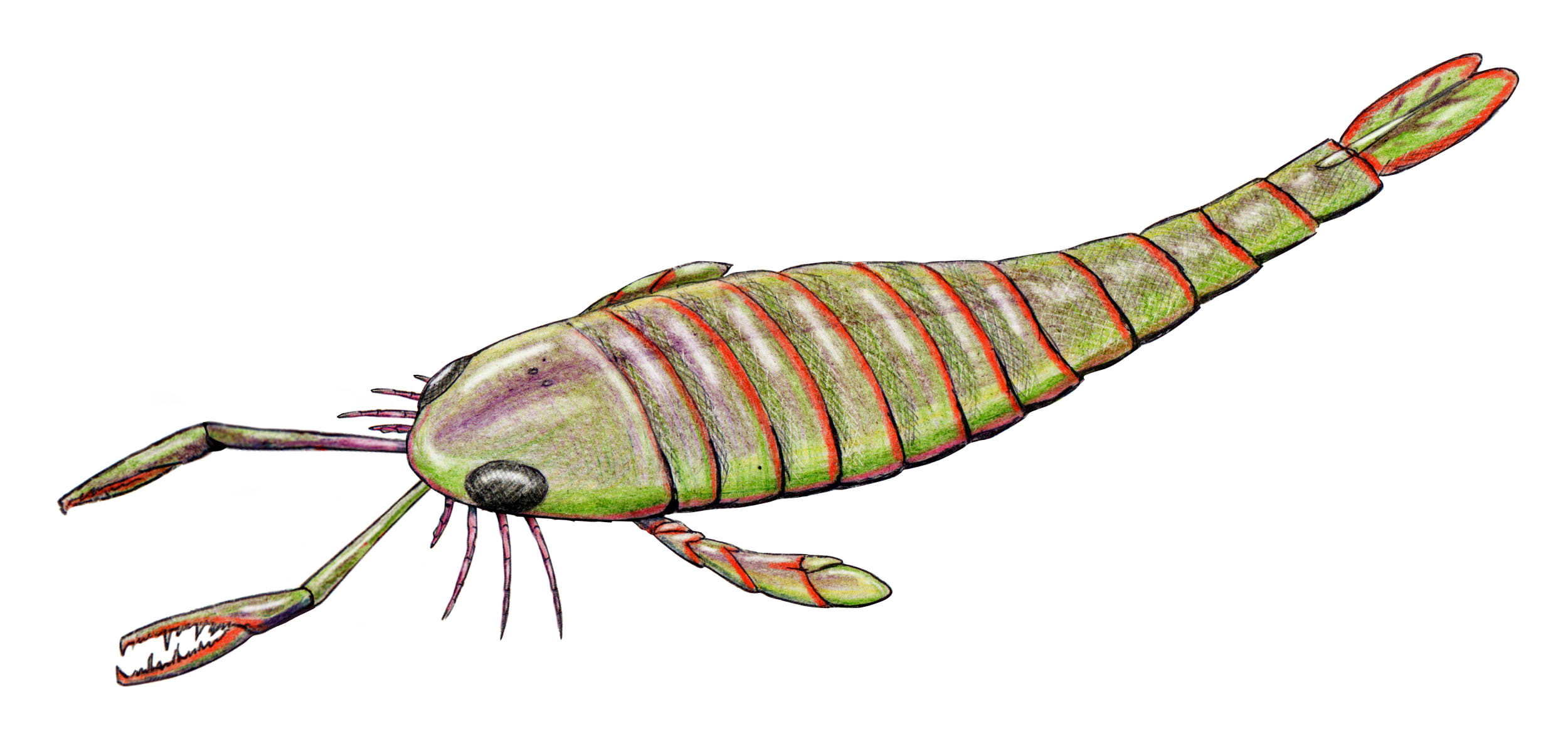
Reconstruction of Erettopterus, a member of the highly successful Silurian and Devonian eurypterid family Pterygotidae

Eurypterids were most diverse and abundant between the Middle Silurian and the Early Devonian, with an absolute peak in diversity during the Pridoli epoch, 423 to 419.2 million years ago, of the very latest Silurian. This peak in diversity has been recognized since the early twentieth century; of the approximately 150 species of eurypterids known in 1916, more than half were from the Silurian and a third were from the Late Silurian alone.

Though stylonurine eurypterids generally remained rare and low in number, as had been the case during the preceding Ordovician, eurypterine eurypterids experienced a rapid rise in diversity and number. In most Silurian fossil beds, eurypterine eurypterids account for 90% of all eurypterids present. Though some were likely already present by the Late Ordovician (simply missing from the fossil record so far), a vast majority of eurypterid groups are first recorded in strata of Silurian age. These include both stylonurine groups such as the Stylonuroidea, Kokomopteroidea and Mycteropoidea as well as eurypterine groups such as the Pterygotioidea, Eurypteroidea and Waeringopteroidea.

The most successful eurypterid by far was the Middle to Late Silurian Eurypterus, a generalist, equally likely to have engaged in predation or scavenging. Thought to have hunted mainly small and soft-bodied invertebrates, such as worms, species of the genus (of which the most common is the type species, E. remipes) account for more than 90% (perhaps as many as 95%) of all known fossil eurypterid specimens. Despite their vast number, Eurypterus are only known from a relatively short temporal range, first appearing during the Late Llandovery epoch (around 432 million years ago) and being extinct by the end of the Pridoli epoch. Eurypterus was also restricted to the continent Euramerica (composed of the equatorial continents Avalonia, Baltica and Laurentia), which had been completely colonized by the genus during its merging and was unable to cross the vast expanses of ocean separating this continent from other parts of the world, such as the southern supercontinent Gondwana. As such, Eurypterus was limited geographically to the coastlines and shallow inland seas of Euramerica.

During the Late Silurian the pterygotid eurypterids, large and specialized forms with several new adaptations, such as large and flattened telsons capable of being used as rudders, and large and specialized chelicerae with enlarged pincers for handling (and potentially in some cases killing) prey appeared. Though the largest members of the family appeared in the Devonian, large two meter (6.5+ ft) pterygotids such as Acutiramus were already present during the Late Silurian. Their ecology ranged from generalized predatory behavior to ambush predation and some, such as Pterygotus itself, were active apex predators in Late Silurian marine ecosystems. The pterygotids were also evidently capable of crossing oceans, becoming one of only two eurypterid groups to achieve a cosmopolitan distribution.

=== Devonian ===
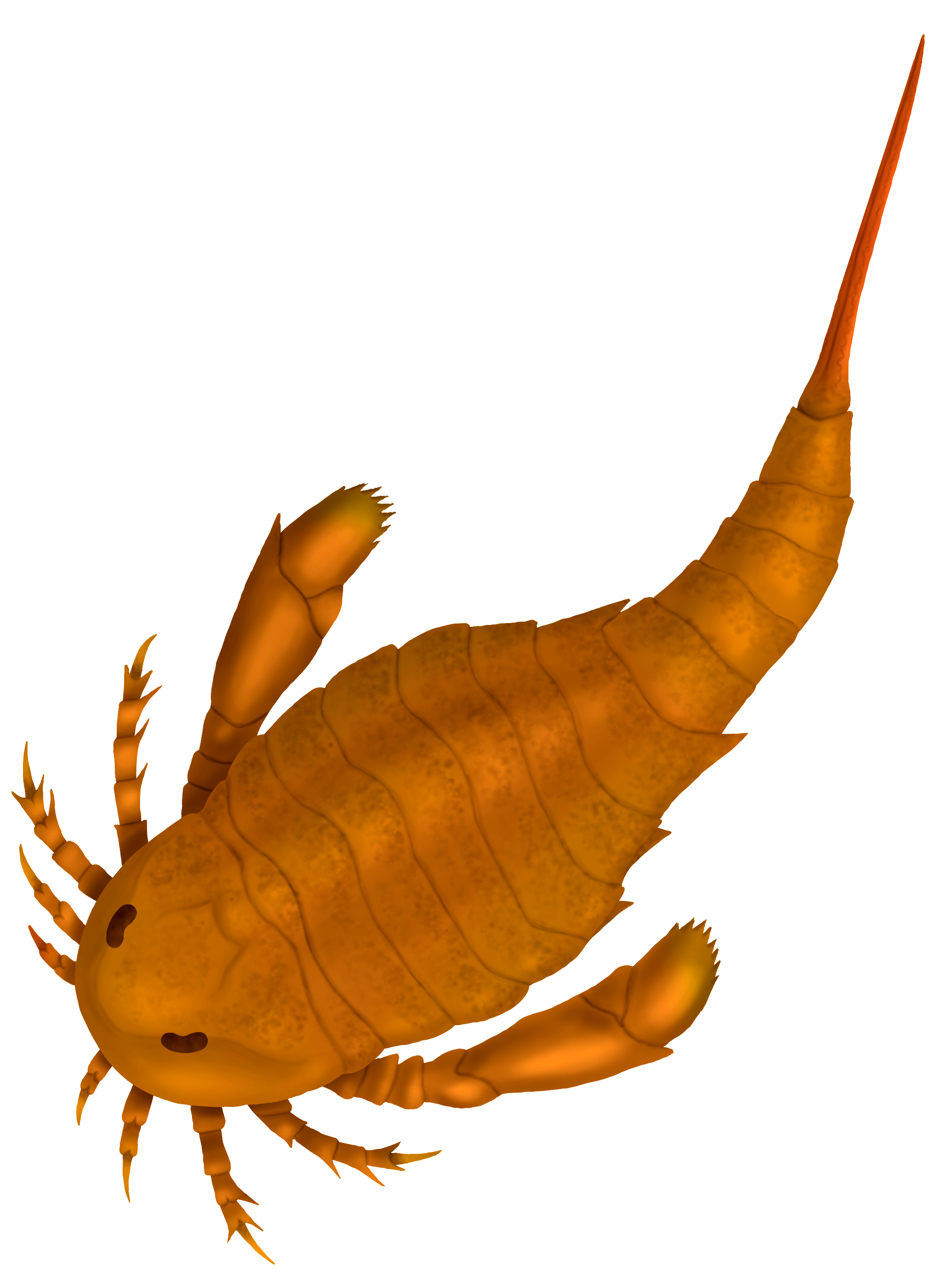
Reconstruction of Adelophthalmus, the only eurypterine (with swimming paddles) eurypterid to survive the Late Devonian extinction and persist into the subsequent Carboniferous and Permian periods.

Though the eurypterids continued to be abundant and diversify during the Early Devonian (for instance leading to the evolution of the pterygotid Jaekelopterus, the largest of all arthropods), the group was one of many heavily affected by the Late Devonian extinction. The extinction event, only known to affect marine life (particularly trilobites, brachiopods and reef-building organisms) effectively crippled the abundance and diversity previously seen within the eurypterids.

A major decline in diversity had already begun during the Early Devonian and eurypterids were rare in marine environments by the Late Devonian. During the Frasnian stage four families went extinct, and the later Famennian saw an additional five families going extinct. As marine groups were the most affected, the eurypterids were primarily impacted within the eurypterine suborder. Only one group of stylonurines (the family Parastylonuridae) went extinct in the Early Devonian. Only two families of eurypterines survived into the Late Devonian at all (Adelophthalmidae and Waeringopteridae). The eurypterines experienced their most major declines in the Early Devonian, during which over 50% of their diversity was lost in just 10 million years. Stylonurines, on the other hand, persisted through the period with more or less consistent diversity and abundance but were affected during the Late Devonian, when many of the older groups were replaced by new forms in the families Mycteroptidae and Hibbertopteridae.

It is possible that the catastrophic extinction patterns seen in the eurypterine suborder were related to the emergence of more derived fish. Eurypterine decline began at the point when jawless fish first became more developed and coincides with the emergence of placoderms (armored fish) in both North America and Europe.

Stylonurines of the surviving hibbertopterid and mycteroptid families completely avoided competition with fish by evolving towards a new and distinct ecological niche. These families experienced a radiation and diversification through the Late Devonian and Early Carboniferous, the last ever radiation within the eurypterids, which gave rise to several new forms capable of "sweep-feeding" (raking through the substrate in search of prey).

=== Carboniferous and Permian ===
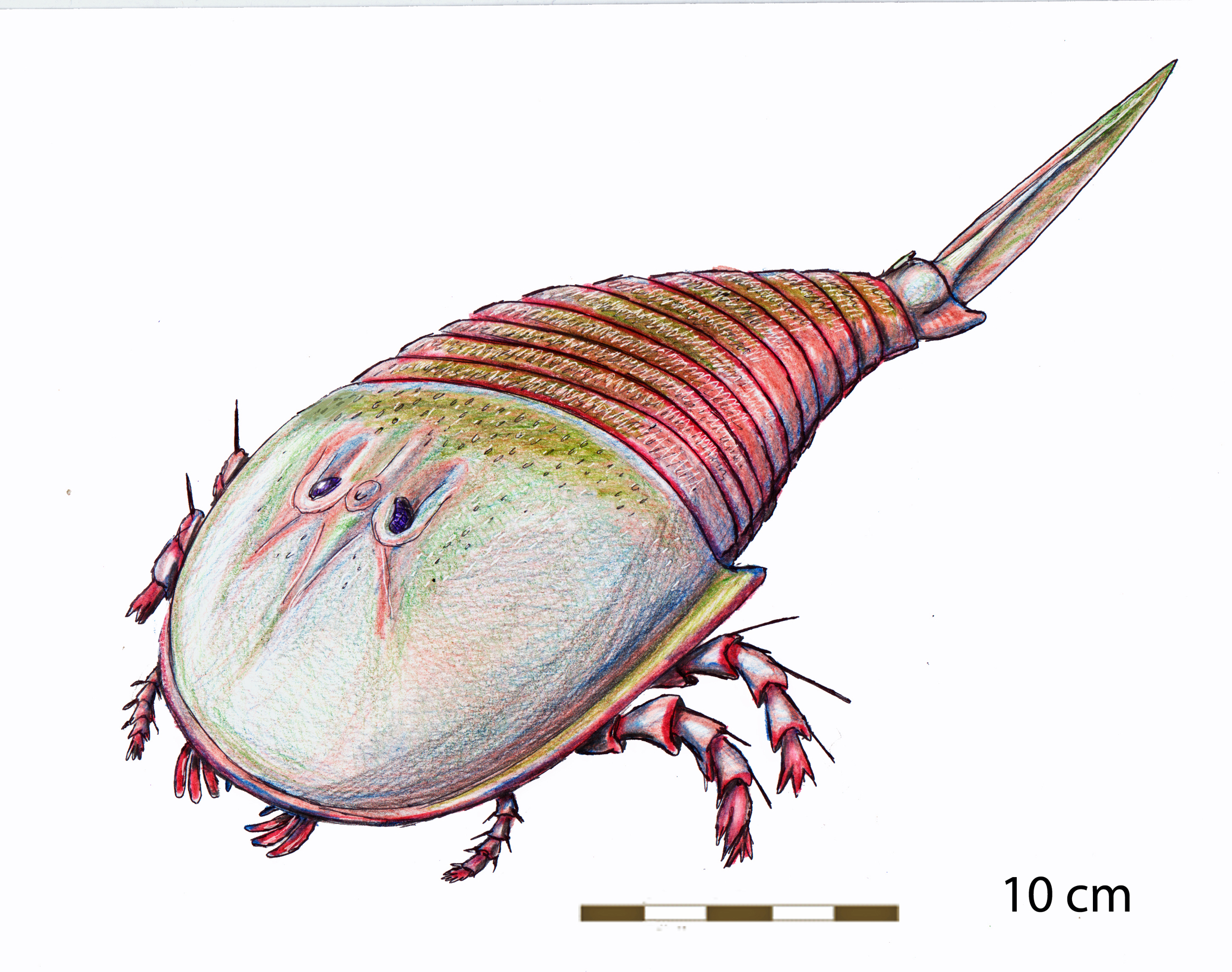
Reconstruction of the hibbertopterid Campylocephalus, the last known surviving eurypterid. Campylocephalus went extinct during the Permian-Triassic extinction event or sometime shortly before.

Only three eurypterid families—Adelophthalmidae, Hibbertopteridae and Mycteroptidae—survived the extinction event in its entirety. It was assumed that these were all freshwater animals, which would have rendered the eurypterids extinct in marine environments, and with marine eurypterid predators gone, sarcopterygians, such as the rhizodonts, were the new apex predators in marine environments. However, various recent findings raise doubts about this, and suggest that these eurypterids were euryhaline forms that lived in marginal marine environments, such as estuaries, deltas, lagoons, and coastal ponds. One argument is paleobiogeographical; pterygotoid distribution seems to require oceanic dispersal. A recent review of Adelophthalmoidea admitted that "There is much more of a marine influence in many of the sections yielding Adelophthalmus than has previously been acknowledged." Similarly, a study of the eurypterid Hibbertopterus from the Carboniferous of New Mexico concluded that the habitat of some eurypterids "may need to be re-evaluated". The sole surviving eurypterine family, Adelophthalmidae, was represented by only a single genus, Adelophthalmus. The hibbertopterids, mycteroptids and Adelophthalmus survived into the Permian.

Adelophthalmus became the most common of all late Paleozoic eurypterids, existing in greater number and diversity than surviving stylonurines, and diversified in the absence of other eurypterines. Out of the 33 species referred to Adelophthalmus, 23 (69%) are from the Carboniferous alone. The genus reached its peak diversity in the Late Carboniferous. Though Adelophthalmus had already been relatively widespread and represented around all major landmasses in the Late Devonian, the amalgamation of Pangaea into a global supercontinent over the course of the last two periods of the Paleozoic allowed Adelophthalmus to gain an almost worldwide distribution.

During the Late Carboniferous and Early Permian Adelophthalmus was widespread, living primarily in brackish and freshwater environments adjacent to coastal plains. These environments were maintained by favorable climate conditions. They did not persist as climate changes owing to Pangaea's formation altered depositional and vegetational patterns across the world. With their habitat gone, Adelophthalmus dwindled in number and had already gone extinct by the Leonardian stage of the Early Permian.

Mycteroptids and hibbertopterids continued to survive for some time, with one genus of each group known from Permian strata: Hastimima and Campylocephalus respectively. Hastimima went extinct during the Early Permian, as Adelophthalmus had, while Campylocephalus persisted longer. A massive incomplete carapace from Permian deposits in Russia represents the sole fossil remains of the species C. permianus, which might have reached 1.4 meters (4.6 ft) in length; while originally considered to be Late Permian in age, other sources suggest a Kungurian-Roadian age (~283-267 million years ago) for the specimen. A fragment of arthropod cuticle from the terminal Permian (approximately 254-252 million years ago) of Australia, given the species name Woodwardopterus freemanorum, was initially suggested as the youngest known eurypterid; James Lamsdell later suggested in 2025 that its morphology was unusual for a eurypterid and that it may represent a true scorpion instead, though he also suggested that it was impossible to confidently place it in either group given the fragmentary nature of currently known remains. No eurypterids are known from fossil beds higher than the Permian. This indicates that the last eurypterids died either in the catastrophic extinction event at its end or at some point shortly before it. This extinction event, the Permian–Triassic extinction event (which occurred around 251.9 million years ago), is the most devastating mass extinction recorded, and rendered many other successful Paleozoic groups, such as the trilobites, extinct.

== History of study ==
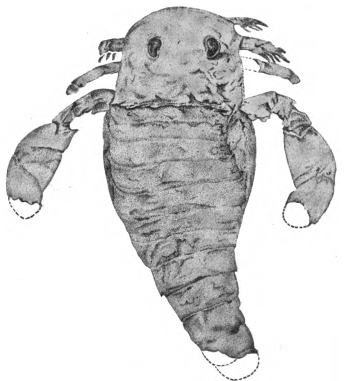
Figure of Eurypterus remipes by James E. De Kay (1825).

The first known eurypterid specimen was discovered in the Silurian-aged rocks of New York, to this day one of the richest eurypterid fossil locations. Samuel L. Mitchill described the specimen, discovered near Westmoreland in Oneida county in 1818. He erroneously identified the fossil as an example of the fish Silurus, likely due to the strange, catfish-like appearance of the carapace. Seven years later, in 1825, James E. DeKay examined the fossil and recognized it as clearly belonging to an arthropod. He thought the fossil, which he named Eurypterus remipes, represented a crustacean of the order Branchiopoda, and suggested it might represent a missing link between the trilobites and more derived branchiopods. The name Eurypterus derives from Greek eurús (εὐρύς 'broad, wide') and pteron (πτερόν 'wing').

In 1843, Hermann Burmeister published his view on trilobite taxonomy and how the group related to other organisms, living and extinct, in the work Die Organisation der Trilobiten aus ihren lebenden Verwandten entwickelt. He considered the trilobites to be crustaceans, as previous authors had, and classified them together with what he assumed to be their closest relatives, Eurypterus and the genus Cytherina, within a clade he named "Palaeadae". Within Palaeadae, Burmeister erected three families; the "Trilobitae" (composed of all trilobites), the "Cytherinidae" (composed only of Cytherina, an animal today seen as an ostracod) and the Eurypteridae (composed of Eurypterus, then including three species).

The fourth eurypterid genus to be described (following Hibbertopterus in 1836 and Campylocephalus in 1838, not identified as eurypterids until later), out of those still seen as taxonomically valid in modern times, was Pterygotus (lit. 'winged one'), described by Louis Agassiz in 1839. Pterygotus was considerably larger in size than Eurypterus and when the first fossils were discovered by quarrymen in Scotland they were referred to as "Seraphims" by the workers. Agassiz first thought the fossils represented remains of fish, only recognizing their nature as arthropod remains five years later in 1844.

In 1849, Frederick M'Coy classified Pterygotus together with Eurypterus and Belinurus (a genus today seen as a xiphosuran) within Burmeister's Eurypteridae. M'Coy considered the Eurypteridae to be a group of crustaceans within the order Entomostraca, closely related to horseshoe crabs. A fourth genus, Slimonia, based on fossil remains previously assigned to a new species of Pterygotus, was referred to the Eurypteridae in 1856 by David Page.

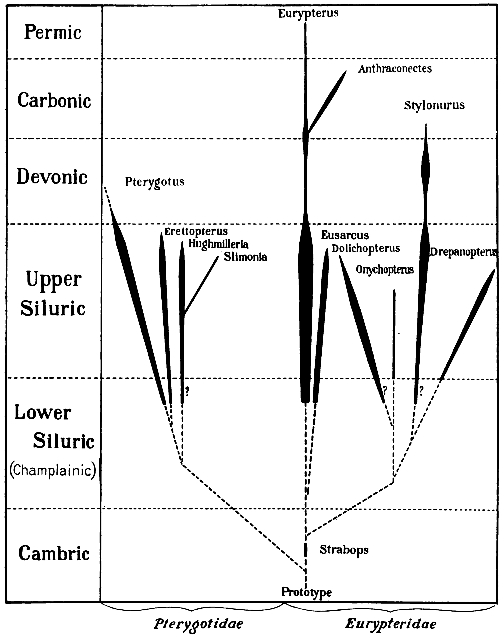
Evolutionary tree of eurypterids as imagined by John Mason Clarke and Rudolf Ruedemann in 1912.

Jan Nieszkowski's De Euryptero Remipede (1858) featured an extensive description of Eurypterus fischeri (now seen as synonymous with another species of Eurypterus, E. tetragonophthalmus), which, along with the monograph On the Genus Pterygotus by Thomas Henry Huxley and John William Salter, and an exhaustive description of the various eurypterids of New York in Volume 3 of the Palaeontology of New York (1859) by James Hall, contributed massively to the understanding of eurypterid diversity and biology. These publications were the first to fully describe the whole anatomy of eurypterids, recognizing the full number of prosomal appendages and the number of preabdominal and postabdominal segments. Both Nieszkowski and Hall recognized that the eurypterids were closely related to modern chelicerates, such as horseshoe crabs.

In 1865, Henry Woodward described the genus Stylonurus (named and figured, but not thoroughly described, by David Page in 1856) and raised the rank of the Eurypteridae to that of order, effectively creating the Eurypterida as the taxonomic unit it is seen as today. In the work Anatomy and Relations of the Eurypterida (1893), Malcolm Laurie added considerably to the knowledge and discussion of eurypterid anatomy and relations. He focused on how the eurypterids related to each other and to trilobites, crustaceans, scorpions, other arachnids and horseshoe crabs. The description of Eurypterus fischeri by Gerhard Holm in 1896 was so elaborate that the species became one of the most completely known of all extinct animals, so much so that the knowledge of E. fischeri was comparable with the knowledge of its modern relatives (such as the Atlantic horseshoe crab). The description also helped solidify the close relationship between the eurypterids and other chelicerates by showcasing numerous homologies between the two groups.

In 1912, John Mason Clarke and Rudolf Ruedemann published The Eurypterida of New York in which all eurypterid species thus far recovered from fossil deposits there were discussed. Clarke and Ruedemann created one of the first phylogenetic trees of eurypterids, dividing the order into two families; Eurypteridae (distinguished by smooth eyes and including Eurypterus, Anthraconectes, Stylonurus, Eusarcus, Dolichopterus, Onychopterus and Drepanopterus) and Pterygotidae (distinguished by faceted eyes and including Pterygotus, Erettopterus, Slimonia and Hughmilleria). Both families were considered to be descended from a common ancestor, Strabops. In line with earlier authors, Clarke and Ruedemann also supported a close relationship between the eurypterids and the horseshoe crabs (united under the class Merostomata) but also discussed alternative hypotheses such as a closer relation to arachnids.

== Classification ==
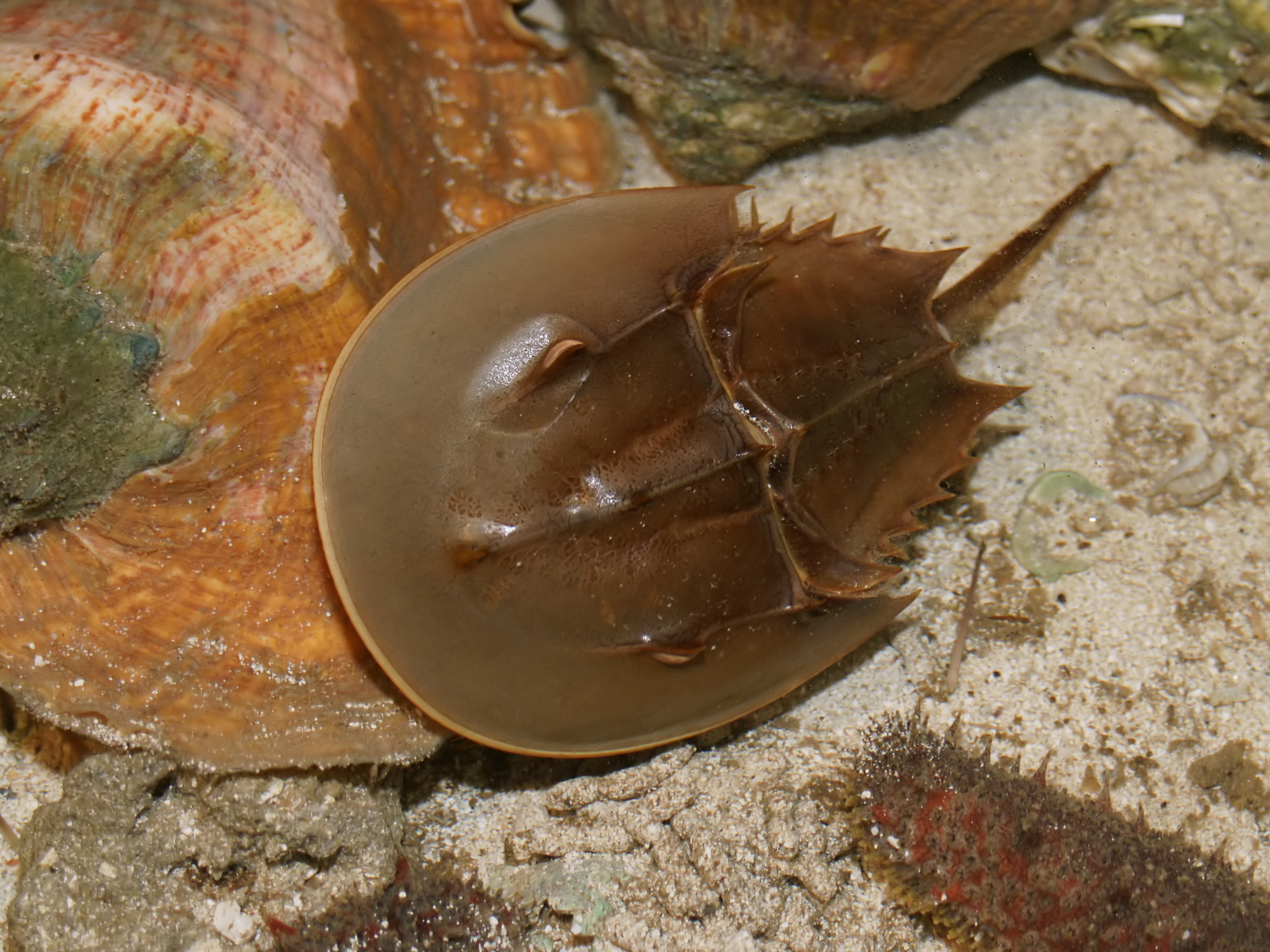
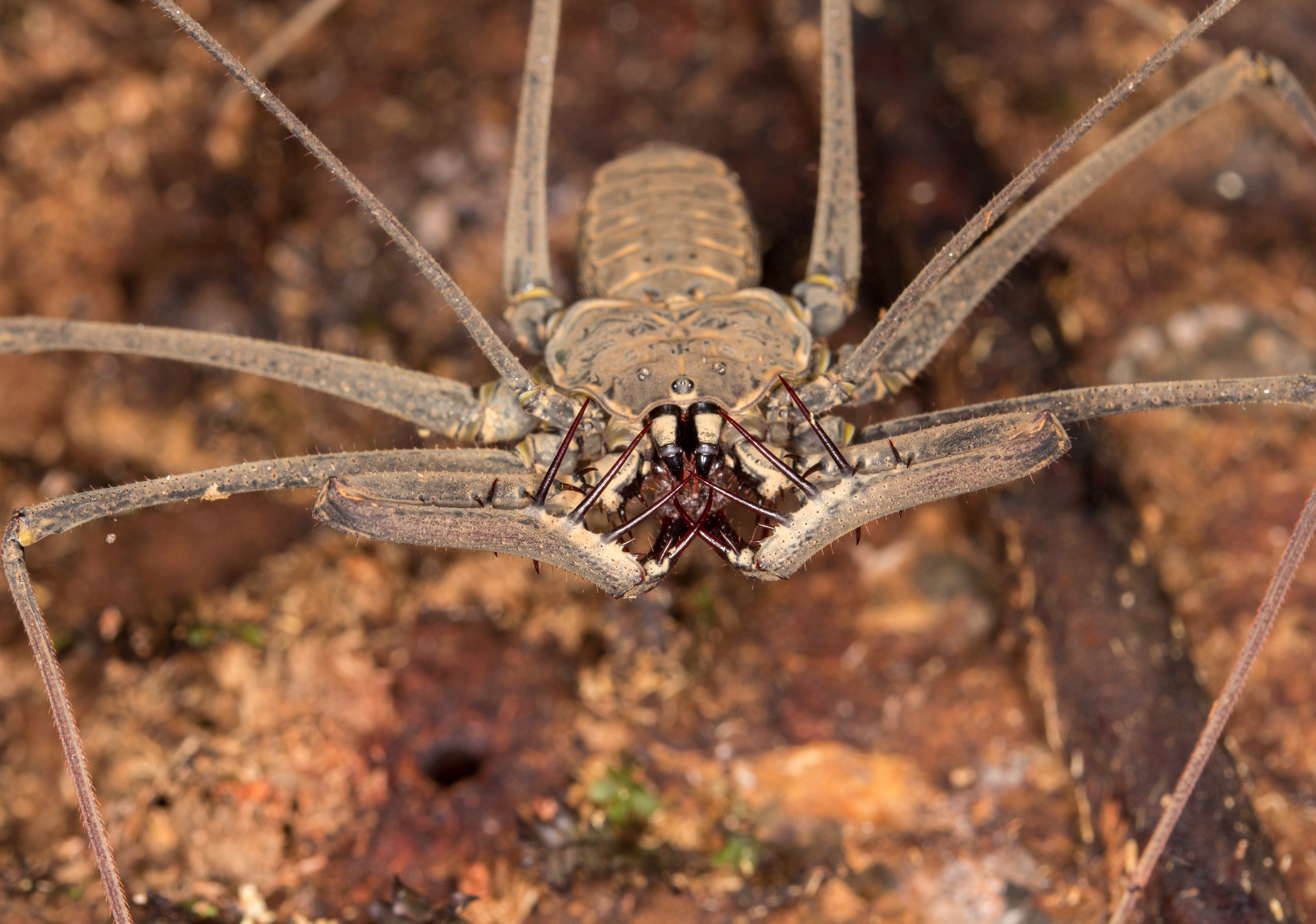
Eurypterids have historically been seen as closely related to xiphosurans such as the Atlantic horseshoe crab (top), united in the class Merostomata. Recent studies are in favor of a closer relationship to arachnids such as Heterophrynus (bottom), united under the clade Sclerophorata.

Historically, a close relationship between eurypterids and xiphosurans (such as the modern Atlantic horseshoe crab) has been assumed by most researchers. Several homologies encourage this view, such as correlating segments of the appendages and the prosoma. Additionally, the presence of plate-like appendages bearing the "gill tracts" on appendages of the opisthosoma (the Blattfüssen) was cited early as an important homology. In the last few decades of the nineteenth century, further homologies were established, such as the similar structures of the compound eyes of Pterygotus and horseshoe crabs (seen as especially decisive as the eye of the horseshoe crab was seen as possessing an almost unique structure) and similarities in the ontogeny within both groups. These ontogenetical similarities were seen as most apparent when studying the nepionic stages (the developmental stage immediately following the embryonic stage) in both groups, during which both xiphosurans and eurypterids have a proportionally larger carapace than adults, are generally broader, possess a distinct ridge down the middle, have a lesser number of segments which lack differentiation and have an underdeveloped telson.

Due to these similarities, the xiphosurans and eurypterids have often been united under a single class or subclass called Merostomata (erected to house both groups by Henry Woodward in 1866). Though xiphosurans (like the eurypterids) were historically seen as crustaceans due to their respiratory system and their aquatic lifestyle, this hypothesis was discredited after numerous similarities were discovered between the horseshoe crabs and the arachnids. Some authors, such as John Sterling Kingsley in 1894, classified the Merostomata as a sister group to the Arachnida under the class "Acerata" within a subphylum "Branchiata". Others, such as Ray Lankester in 1909, went further and classified the Merostomata as a subclass within the Arachnida, raised to the rank of class.

In 1866, Ernst Haeckel classified the Merostomata (containing virtually only the Eurypterida) and Xiphosura within a group he named Gigantostraca within the crustaceans. Though Haeckel did not designate any taxonomic rank for this clade, it was interpreted as equivalent to the rank of subclass, such as the Malacostraca and Entomostraca, by later researchers such as John Sterling Kinsgsley. In subsequent research, Gigantostraca has been treated as synonymous with Merostomata (rarely) and Eurypterida itself (more commonly). A phylogenetic analysis (the results presented in a cladogram below) conducted by James Lamsdell in 2013 on the relationships within the Xiphosura and the relations to other closely related groups (including the eurypterids, which were represented in the analysis by genera Eurypterus, Parastylonurus, Rhenopterus and Stoermeropterus) concluded that the Xiphosura, as presently understood, was paraphyletic (a group sharing a last common ancestor but not including all descendants of this ancestor) and thus not a valid phylogenetic group. Eurypterids were recovered as closely related to arachnids instead of xiphosurans, forming the group Sclerophorata within the clade Dekatriata (composed of sclerophorates and chasmataspidids). Lamsdell noted that it is possible that Dekatriata is synonymous with Sclerophorata as the reproductive system, the primary defining feature of sclerophorates, has not been thoroughly studied in chasmataspidids. Dekatriata is, in turn, part of the Prosomapoda, a group including the Xiphosurida (the only monophyletic xiphosuran group) and other stem-genera.

- Arthropoda
  - †Fuxianhuia
  - - †Antennulata
      - †Emeraldella
      - †Trilobitomorpha
      - †Sidneyia
    - - †Megacheira
        - †Yohoia
        - - †Alalcomenaeus
          - †Leanchoilia
      - Chelicerata
        - Pycnogonida
          - †Palaeoisopus
          - - Pycnogonum
            - †Haliestes
        - Euchelicerata
          - †Offacolus
          - Prosomapoda
            - †Weinbergina
            - - - †Venustulus
                - †Camanchia
              - - †Legrandella
                - - Xiphosura
                    - †Kasibelinurus
                    - - †Willwerathia
                      - Xiphosurida
                        - †Lunataspis
                        - - †Belinurina
                          - Limulidae
                  - Planaterga
                    - - †Pseudoniscus
                      - †Cyamocephalus
                    - †Pasternakevia
                    - - †Bunodes
                      - †Limuloides
                    - †Bembicosoma
                    - Dekatriata
                      - †Chasmataspidida
                      - Sclerophorata
                        - Arachnida
                        - †Eurypterida

=== Internal relationships ===
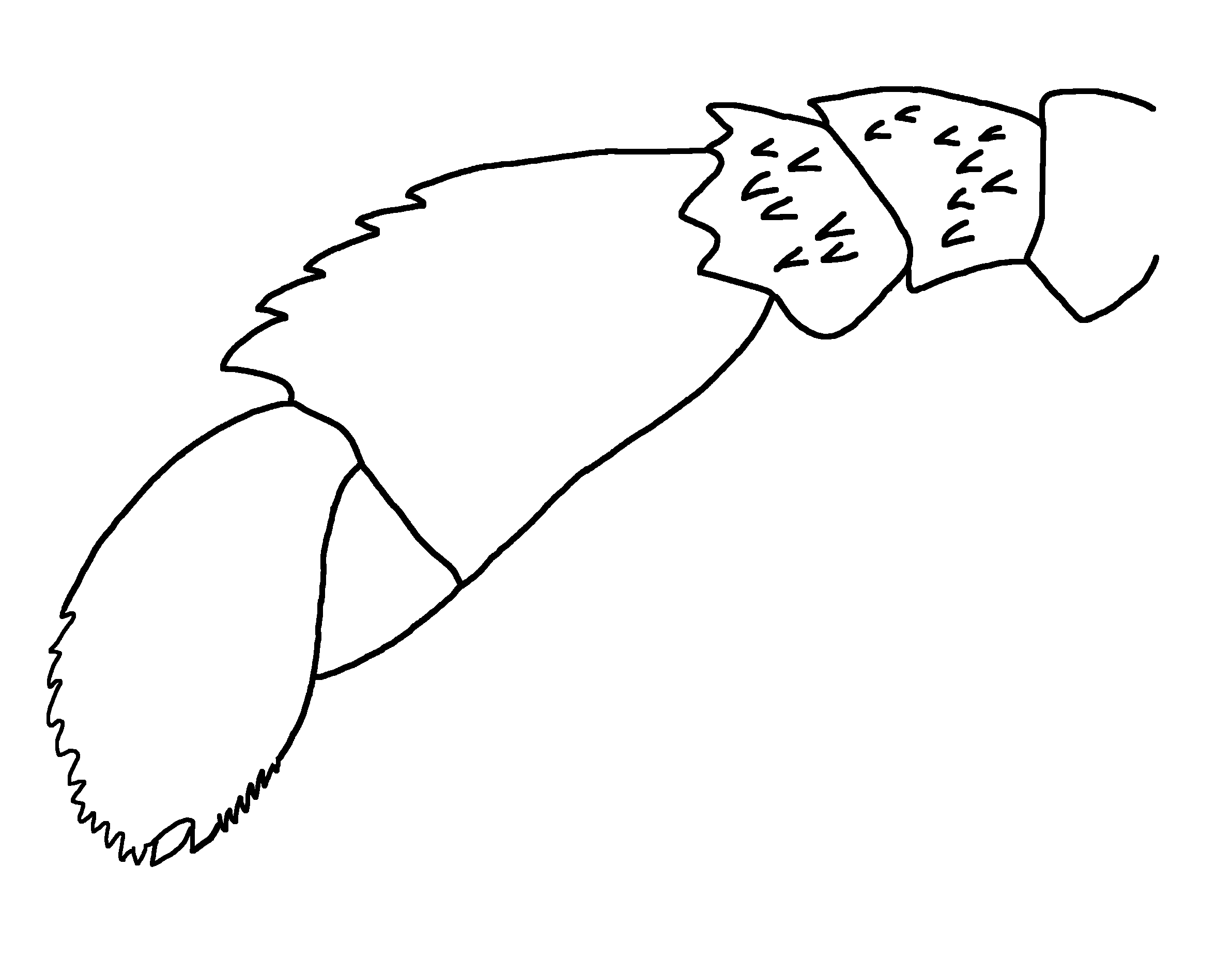
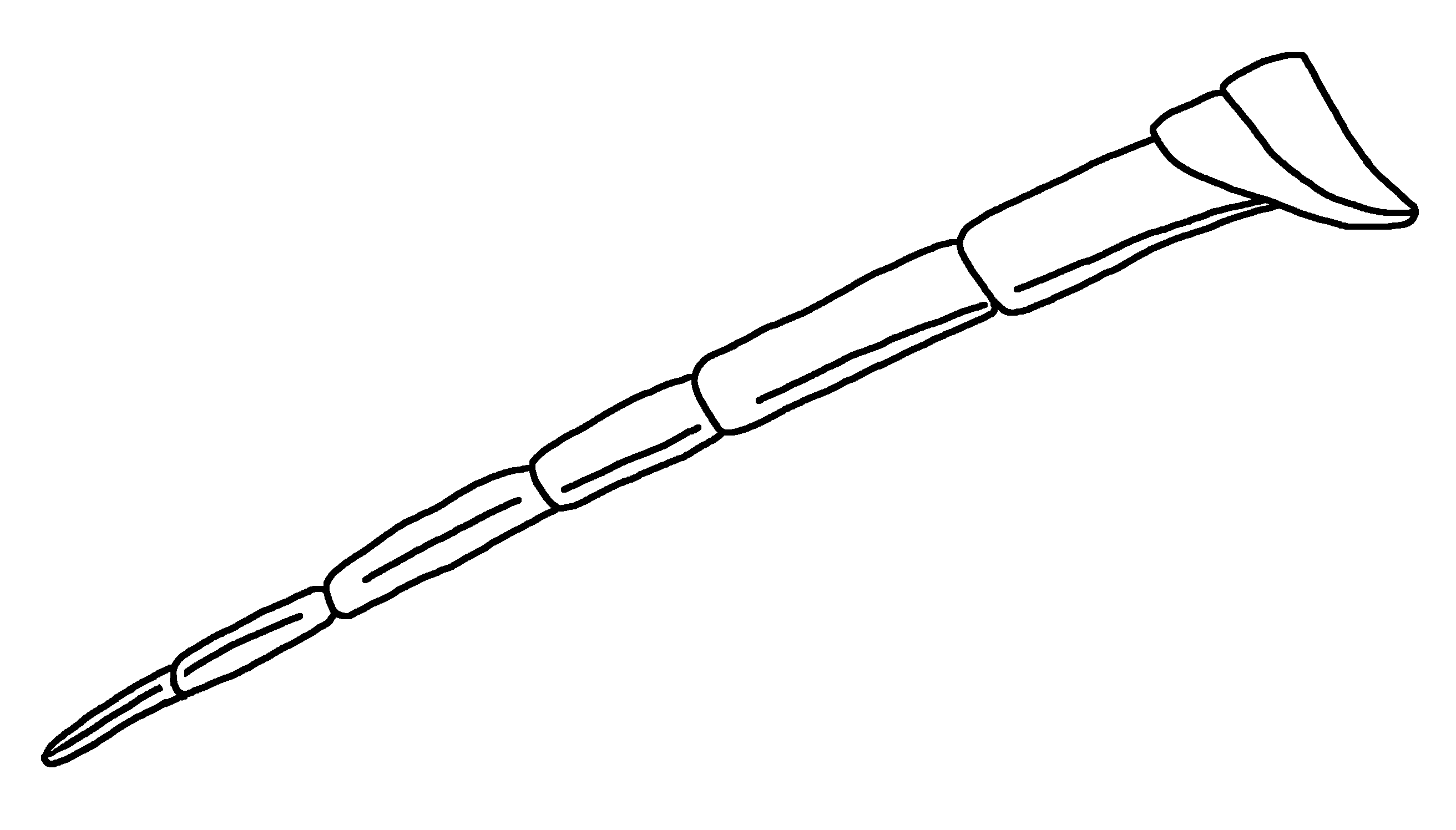
The most important taxonomic character in eurypterids is the morphology of the sixth pair of appendages. In most eurypterids of the suborder Eurypterina, such as Bassipterus (top), this leg is modified into a swimming paddle. In eurypterids of the suborder Stylonurina, such as Parastylonurus (bottom), it is not.

The internal classification of eurypterids within the Eurypterida is based mainly on eleven established characters. These have been used throughout the history of eurypterid research to establish clades and genera. These characters include: the shape of the prosoma, the shape of the metastoma, the shape and position of the eyes, the types of prosomal appendages, the types of swimming leg paddles, the structure of the doublure (the fringe of the dorsal exoskeleton), the structure of the opisthosoma, the structure of the genital appendages, the shape of the telson and the type of ornamentation present. It is worth noting that not all of these characters are of equal taxonomic importance. They are not applicable to all eurypterids either; stylonurine eurypterids lack swimming leg paddles entirely. Some characters, including the prosoma and metastoma shapes and the position and shapes of the eyes, are seen as important only for the distinction between different genera. Most superfamilies and families are defined based on the morphology of the appendages.

The most important character used in eurypterid taxonomy is the type of prosomal appendages as this character is used to define entire suborders. General leg anatomy can also be used to define superfamilies and families. Historically, the chelicerae were considered the most important appendages from a taxonomical standpoint since they only occurred in two general types: a eurypterid type with small and toothless pincers and a pterygotid type with large pincers and teeth. This distinction has historically been used to divide the Eurypterida into the two suborders Eurypterina (small chelicerae) and "Pterygotina" (large and powerful chelicerae). This classification scheme is not without problems. In Victor Tollerton's 1989 taxonomic revision of the Eurypterida, with suborders Eurypterina and Pterygotina recognized, several clades of eurypterids today recognized as stylonurines (including hibbertopterids and mycteroptids) were reclassified as non-eurypterids in the new separate order "Cyrtoctenida" on the grounds of perceived inconsistencies in the prosomal appendages.

Modern research favors a classification into suborders Eurypterina and Stylonurina instead, supported by phylogenetic analyses. In particular, pterygotid eurypterids share a number of homologies with derived eurypterine eurypterids such as the adelophthalmids, and are thus best classified as derived members of the same suborder. In the Stylonurina, the sixth pair of appendages is represented by long and slender walking legs and lack a modified spine (referred to as the podomere 7a). In most eurypterids in the Eurypterina, the sixth pair of appendages is broadened into swimming paddles and always has a podomere 7a. 75% of eurypterid species are eurypterines and they represent 99% of all fossil eurypterid specimens. Of all eurypterid clades, the Pterygotioidea is the most species-rich, with over 50 species. The second most species-rich clade is the Adelophthalmoidea, with over 40 species.

A complete analysis of the taxonomy and phylogenetics of eurypterids was published in 2025 by Lamsdell based on all his research on the group, recognizing similar relationships to previous studies but also adding one new superfamily, ten new families, six new genera, and one new species. Every described species was evaluated, though not all were included in the analysis, with Dorfopterus and Marsupipterus removed from Eurypterida as indeterminate arthropods. The resultant interrelationships of Eurypterida can be seen below, showing orders, superfamilies, and families.

- Eurypterida
  - Stylonurina
    - - Rhenopteroidea
        - Brachyopteridae
        - - Brachyopterellidae
          - Rhenopteridae
    - - - Stylonuroidea
          - Parastylonuridae
          - - Stylonurellidae
            - Stylonuridae
      - - Kokomopteroidea
          - Hardieopteridae
          - Kokomopteridae
        - Mycteropoidea
          - Drepanopteridae
          - - Hibbertopteridae
            - Mycteropidae
  - Eurypterina
    - - Moselopteroidea
        Moselopteridae
    - - - Alkenopteroidea
          Alkenopteridae
      - - - Onychopterelloidea
            Onychopterellidae
        - - - Dolichopteroidea
              - Dolichopteridae
              - - Erieopteridae
                - Strobilopteridae
          - - Eurypteroidea
              Eurypteridae
            - Diploperculata
              - - Carcinosomatoidea
                  - Megalograptidae
                  - - Carcinosomatidae
                    - - Mixopteridae
                      - Lanarkopteridae
              - - - Waeringopteroidea
                    Waeringopteridae
                - - Pterygotoidea
                    - Hunanopteridae
                    - - Hughmilleriidae
                      - - Herefordopteridae
                        - - Slimoniidae
                          - - Ciurcopteridae
                            - Pterygotidae
                  - Adelophthalmoidea
                    - Nanahughmilleriidae
                    - - Parahughmilleriidae
                      - - Pittsfordipteridae
                        - Adelophthalmidae

== See also ==
- List of eurypterid genera
- Nepidae—an unrelated family of insects, commonly known as "water scorpions".
- Cottidae—family of fishes in which some members contain "sea scorpion" in their common name.
- History of life
