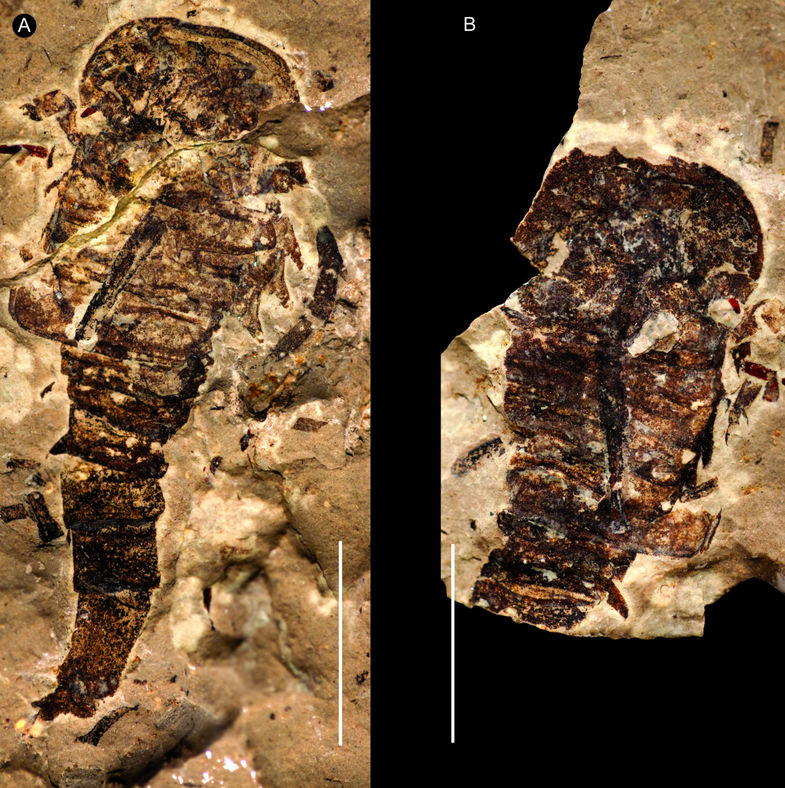
- Fossil of S. proteus (left) with its counterpart (right)
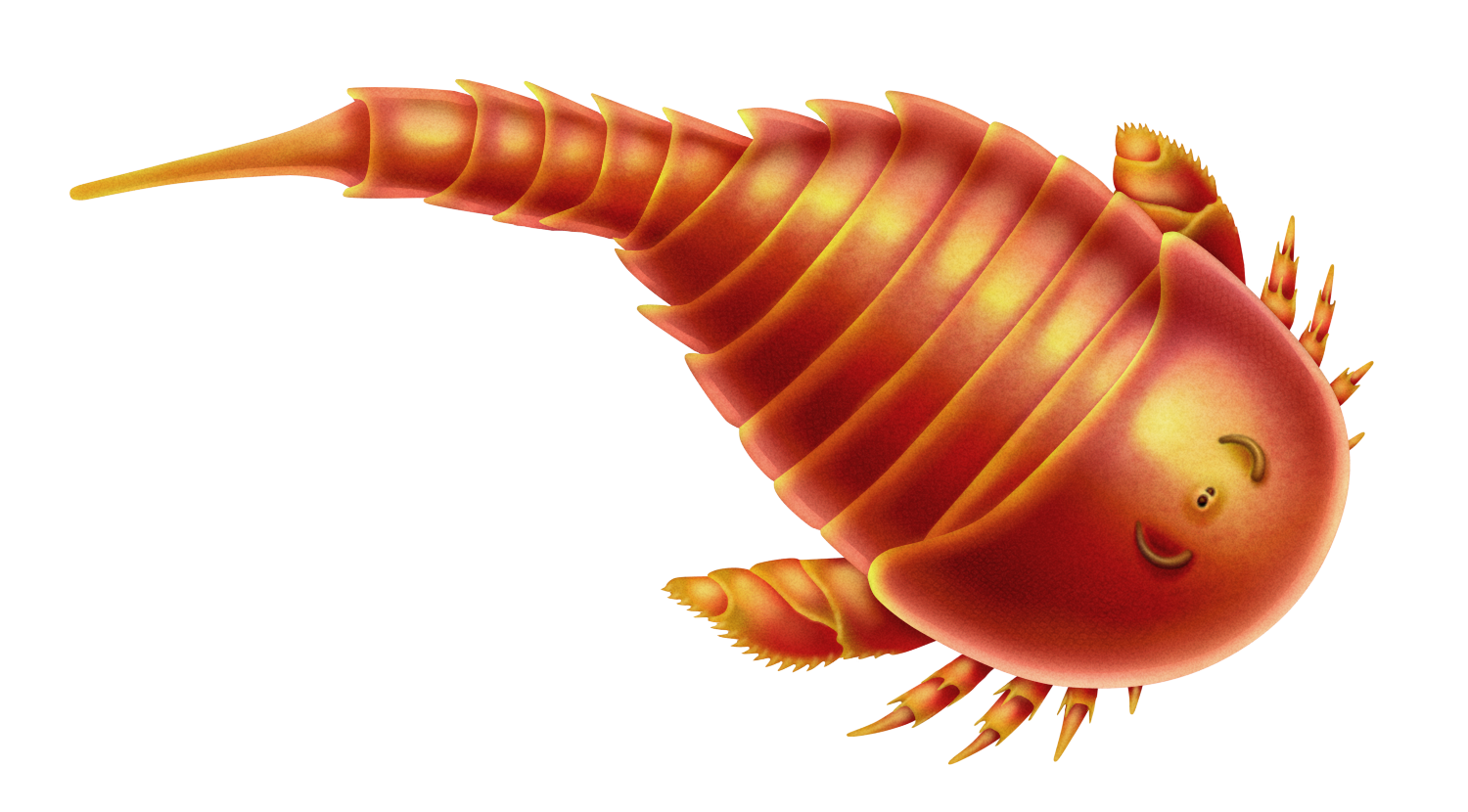
- Life restoration of S. proteus

Scientific classification
- Kingdom: Animalia
- Phylum: Arthropoda
- Subphylum: Chelicerata
- Order: †Eurypterida
- Family: †Strobilopteridae
- Genus: †Strobilopterus; Ruedemann, 1935

Type species
- Strobilopterus princetonii Ruedemann, 1934

Other species
- S. laticeps Schmidt, 1883; S. proteus Lamsdell, 2025; S. richardsoni Kjellesvig-Waering, 1961

Synonyms
- Syntomopterella Tetlie, 2007

= Strobilopterus =

Strobilopterus Temporal range: Silurian–Devonian

Extinct genus of Devonian organisms

Strobilopterus is a genus of prehistoric eurypterid of the family Strobilopteridae. The genus contains four species, two from the Devonian of Wyoming, United States (S. princetonii and S. proteus), one from the Devonian of Ohio, United States (S. richardsoni) and one from the Silurian of Estonia (S. laticeps).

== Description ==
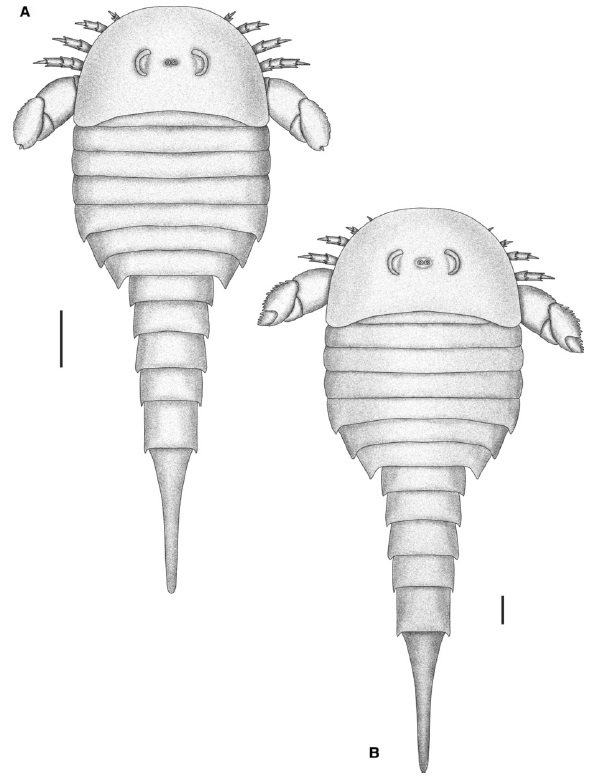
Subadult and adult instars of S. proteus. A: Juvenile/subadult instar, B: Subadult/adult instar.

Strobilopterus was a large strobilopterid eurypterid, with adults of the species S. proteus measuring approximately 15 to 20 centimetres in length. The carapace of Strobilopterus was wide and semicircular in shape, with the lateral eyes lunate to crescentic with the palpebral lobe between the central and centrimesial sectors. The first pair of appendages were small, lacking denticles, and the subsequent four pairs of appendages were likewise also small, but with fixed spines and serrated distal podomere margins. The sixth and last pair of appendages were short but were powerfully serrated on the anterior margins of the podomeres. The type A genital appendage was long and undivided, the type B appendage was more oval in shape.
