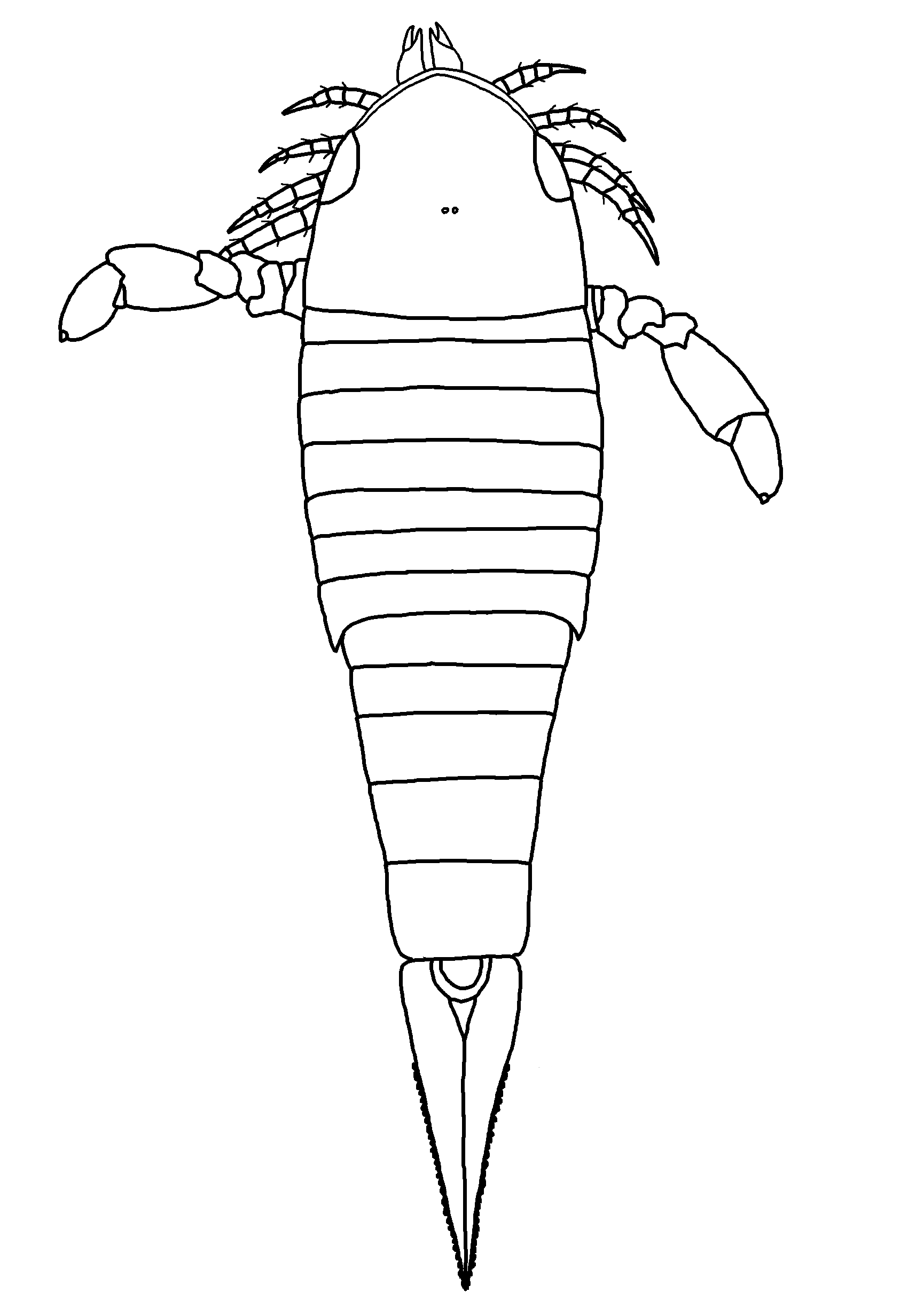
- Restoration of H. banksii

Scientific classification
- Kingdom: Animalia
- Phylum: Arthropoda
- Subphylum: Chelicerata
- Order: †Eurypterida
- Superfamily: †Pterygotioidea
- Family: †Herefordopteridae; Lamsdell, 2025
- Genus: †Herefordopterus; Tetlie, 2006

Type species
- †Herefordopterus banksii Salter, 1856

Synonyms
- Hughmilleria acuminata Salter, 1859

= Herefordopterus =

Herefordopterus Temporal range: Pridoli, 421–419 Ma

Extinct genus of arthropods

Herefordopterus is a genus of eurypterid, an extinct group of aquatic arthropods. Herefordopterus is classified as the only genus in the family Herefordopteridae, a basal family in the highly derived Pterygotioidea superfamily of eurypterids. Fossils of the single and type species, H. banksii, have been discovered in deposits of Silurian age in Herefordshire and Shropshire, England. The genus is named after Herefordshire, where most of the Herefordopterus fossils have been found. The specific epithet honors Richard Banks, who found several well-preserved specimens, including the first Herefordopterus fossils.

Herefordopterus was previously classified in Hughmilleriidae, a pterygotioid family that is differentiated by their streamlined bodies, the enlargement of its medium-sized chelicerae and the presence of paired spines on the walking appendages. It was distinguished for combining characteristics of Hughmilleria with those of the derived pterygotioids, showing a more advanced morphology than that of Hughmilleria. With the biggest specimen measuring 12 centimetres (5 inches) in length, Herefordopterus is considered a eurypterid of small size.

== Description ==
Size comparison of H. banksii with a human hand

Herefordopterus was a small-sized eurypterid with only 12 cm (5 in) in length, being surpassed in size by other pterygotioids such as Slimonia acuminata with 100 cm (39 in) or Jaekelopterus rhenaniae and (potentially) Erettopterus grandis with 2.5 m (8.2 ft). This size makes it the smallest genus and one of the smallest species of the entire Pterygotioidea superfamily, the related Hunanopterus wangi at 6 cm (3 in) being the smallest one.

It had a parabolic (approximately U-shaped) to campanulate (bell-shaped) carapace (head plate) with an angular anterior margin that narrows toward the eyes, the second to fifth pair of prosomal appendages with a single pair of short spines on each podomere (leg segments) and large oval and marginal eyes. The ocelli (light-sensitive simple eyes) were relatively large and placed between the posterior part of the eyes. The postabdominal segments (segments 8 to 12) were longer than the preabdominal segments (segments 1 to 7) and lacking of ornamentation. It had 12-13 gnathobasic (of the gnathobase, a lower appendage used in feeding) teeth in the sixth appendage, as in pterygotids. The genital operculum (a plate-like segment which contains the genital aperture) of Herefordopterus was composed by two fused opercular segments posterior to the deltoid plates (two small plates above the genital appendage), which are more clearly expressed in the type B specimens (assumed to be males). It was ornamented with prominent scales. The telson (the most posterior segment of the body) was wide anteriorly posteriorly tapering to a lanceolate shape with a keel. It presents a marginal ornamentation of crenulated (slightly notched) margins composed of dark scales.

Herefordopterus stands out for its great resemblance to Hughmilleria with derived (more "advanced") elements reminiscent of Slimonidae and Pterygotidae, such as its number of gnathobasic teeth or the ornamentation of the telson.

== History of research ==
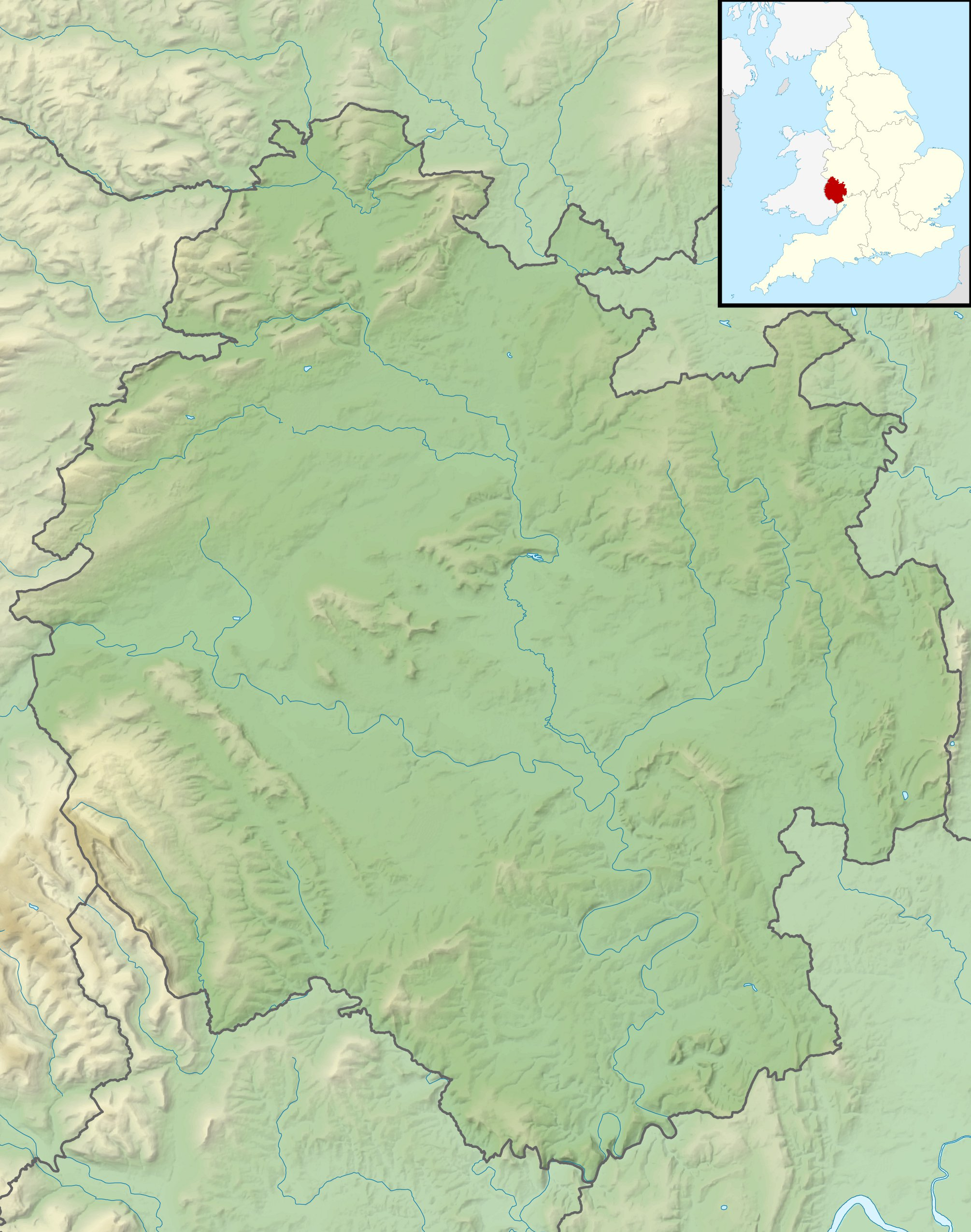
Ubication of the three locations where fossils of Herefordopterus have been found. Type locality in italics.

Herefordopterus banksii was first considered a species of Himantopterus (a preoccupied name, now Erettopterus), H. banksii, by John William Salter in 1856, making it one of the oldest eurypterid species. The first fossils, discovered in Kington, include the prosoma (head) and fragmentary remains of the nine first segments. Salter noted a scale-like sculpturing on its forward margin and related the species to H. lanceolatus (now tentatively placed in the genus Nanahughmilleria). He decided to dedicate the specific name banksii to Richard Banks of Kington, who found several well-preserved specimens of Himantopterus and sent them to Salter. Three years later, Salter erroneously assigned H. banksii to Pterygotus (Erettopterus) based on bilobed telsons of Erettopterus spatulatus that he misidentified as belonging to H. banksii. In turn, the telsons of H. banksii were referred to Stylonurus megalops (now in the genus Hardieopterus). It would not be until 1934 when Størmer classified P. (E.) banksii in Hughmilleria. H. banksii was described in more detail in 1951 by Kjellesvig-Waering, who agreed that specimens assigned to S. megalops should be assigned to H. banksii. However, he was also wrong in assigning a walking leg of Salteropterus abbreviatus to the hughmilleriid species. Currently, all descriptions prior to 2006 of H. banksii are considered inadequate or of little use.

The separation of H. banksii as an independent genus was predicted by Størmer in 1973, when he noticed that the morphology of the type B genital appendage was more similar to that of Parahughmilleria. In 2006, O. Erik Tetlie redescribed the species based on the majority of available material. The new study helped to redistribute erroneously assigned material, to reinterpret the morphology of H. banksii and to question the basality and phylogenetic position of Hughmilleria with respect to Slimonidae and Pterygotidae. Tetlie erected a new genus due to the obvious similarity with Hughmilleria with several derived characteristics shared with the slimonids and pterygotids. The name Herefordopterus derives from Herefordshire, where the vast majority of its fossils have been found. In addition, the poorly known species Hughmilleria acuminata, previously known only by two telsons, was synonymized with Herefordopterus due to being anteriorly wide. However, these telsons had a wider portion than usual than in the rest of the telsons of H. banksii, in addition to being completely flattened, although this may be due to the different degree of compression and preservation.

== Classification ==
Herefordopterus is classified within the family Herefordopteridae in the superfamily Pterygotioidea. Originally, Herefordopterus was considered a species of Himantopterus, later it would be classified under Hughmilleria until it was reclassified in its own genus in 2006 by O. Erik Tetlie. Herefordopterus was previously classified as part of the Hughmilleriidae, but was reclassified in its own family by James Lamsdell in 2025. Lamsdell motivated the creation of a new family through both the unique ornamentation of the telson in Herefordopterus, and due to Herefordopterus not resolving in a monophyletic clade with Hughmilleria in phylogenetic analyses.

Herefordopterus and Hughmilleria shared a subtriangular carapace outline with the pterygotids and the wide telson and genital appendages of all three taxa were similar, although the genital appendages of Herefordopterus and Hughmilleria were more similar to those of Slimonia by the division of these into three segments, in contrast to the undivided morphology in the pterygotids. Still, Herefordopterus and Hughmilleria differ from pterygotids and slimonids by the presence of paired spines on the walking appendages, that along with the characteristics that Slimonia and Ciurcopterus share, suggest that the hughmilleriids are more distant from the pterygotids than Slimonia is. Within Hughmilleriidae, both genera possessed a marginal rim much broader anteriorly than posteriorly and spiniferous appendages, but Hughmilleria had 18-20 gnathobasic teeth on appendage VI, unlike Herefordopterus and the pterygotids, which had 12-13. Therefore, Herefordopterus is placed as the sister taxon (closest relative) of the clade of Slimonidae and Pterygotidae and a more derived form than Hughmilleria.

The cladogram presented below, derived from a 2007 study by researcher O. Erik Tetlie, showcases the interrelationships between the pterygotioid eurypterids.

- Pterygotioidea
  - Hughmilleria wangi
  - - Hughmilleria socialis
    - Hughmilleria shawangunk
  - - Herefordopterus banksii
    - - Slimonia acuminata
      - Pterygotidae
        - Ciurcopterus ventricosus
        - - - Pterygotus anglicus
            - - Jaekelopterus rhenaniae
              - - Acutiramus macrophthalmus
                - Acutiramus bohemicus
          - - Erettopterus bilobus
            - - Erettopterus serricaudatus
              - - Erettopterus osiliensis
                - Erettopterus waylandsmithi

== Paleoecology ==
The Late Silurian of Herefordshire was home to a wide array of different eurypterids, including species of Erettopterus, Eurypterus, Nanahughmilleria, Marsupipterus, Salteropterus and potentially Slimonia (depending on the identity of S. stylops). This eurypterid fauna coexisted with lingulids, ostracods and cephalaspidimorph fish, such as Hemicyclaspis and Thelodus. Herefordopterus lived in a benthic (at the lowest level of water) environment near an intertidal sandy shore and intertidal sandy mudflat environments. The lithology of the site was of green mudstone and sandstone, with mud cracks and pedogenic carbonate (calcrete).

== See also ==
- List of eurypterid genera
- Timeline of eurypterid research
- Hughmilleria
- Salteropterus
- Pterygotidae
