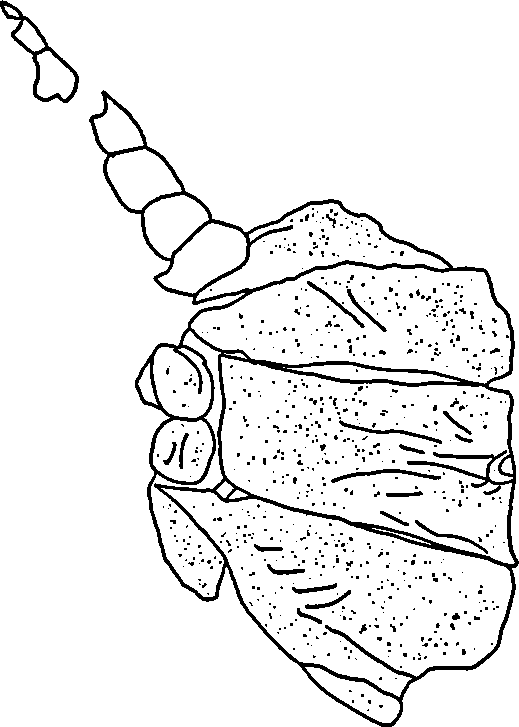
- Illustration of In.43786, the holotype (and only known) specimen of N. salweyi.

Scientific classification
- Kingdom: Animalia
- Phylum: Arthropoda
- Subphylum: Chelicerata
- Order: †Eurypterida
- Superfamily: †Pterygotioidea
- Family: †Pterygotidae
- Genus: †Necrogammarus; Woodward, 1870
- Species: †N. salweyi

Binomial name
- †Necrogammarus salweyi Woodward, 1870

= Necrogammarus =

Necrogammarus Temporal range: Late Silurian, 422.9–418.7 Ma

Extinct genus of arthropods

Necrogammarus salweyi is the binomial name applied to an arthropod fossil discovered in Herefordshire, England. The fossil represents a fragmentary section of the underside and an appendage of a pterygotid eurypterid, a group of large and predatory aquatic arthropods that lived from the late Silurian to the late Devonian. The Necrogammarus fossil is Late Silurian in age and its generic name means "dead lobster", deriving from Ancient Greek νεκρός (nekrós, “dead body”) and Latin gammarus ("lobster").

Historically classified as either a millipede or a crustacean (hence the name) and once considered to potentially represent the oldest myriapod in the fossil record, Necrogammarus was first revealed to represent a fragmentary section of a large pterygotid eurypterid in 1986 by the researcher Paul Selden. As two large pterygotids are already known from the same locality and same timespan as Necrogammarus, Erettopterus and Pterygotus, it is possible that the Necrogammarus remains, in reality, belong to one of these genera. As both genera are only diagnosed and differentiated from each other by features in body parts absent in the Necrogammarus fossil, such as the chelicerae (frontal appendages) and coxae (leg segments), it is impossible to assign Necrogammarus to either of them for the time being.

Pterygotids are differentiated from other eurypterids by their flattened telsons (the most posterior segment of the body) and their modified chelicerae (frontal appendages), ending in well-developed chelae (claws). Regardless of its potential identity as either Pterygotus or Erettopterus, these features are likely to have been present in Necrogammarus as well, as all other members of the family possess them.

== History of research ==
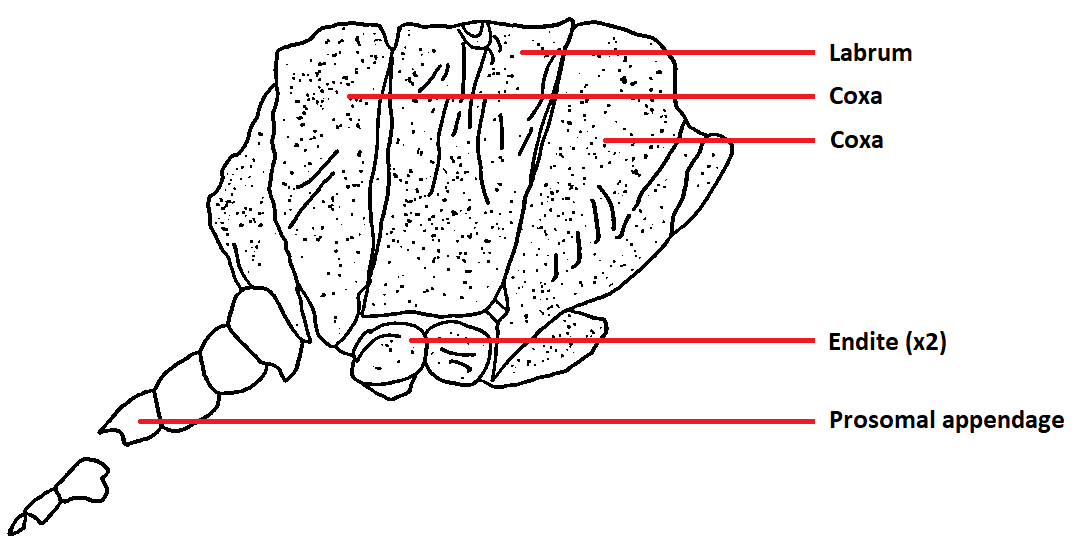
The Necrogammarus holotype labelled as per Paul Selden's interpretation of it as a eurypterid.

The Necrogammarus fossil was collected by Humphrey Salwey at Church Hill quarry in Leintwardine, a village in Herefordshire, England. The specific deposits from which the fossil were uncovered are part of the Lower Leintwardine Beds or the Middle Elton Beds, both Ludlow (Late Silurian) in age.

The specimen, designated with the specimen number In.43786 and housed at the British Museum of Natural History, was first described by the prominent eurypterid researchers John William Salter and Thomas Henry Huxley in 1859. Though the two researchers must have thought it represented a eurypterid at first, as its fossils were included in a plate otherwise only featuring fossils of Pterygotus, they dismissed the idea in the explanatory text of the specimens by saying that the specimen had been "accidentally introduced into this plate". Instead, the two researchers considered the fossil to likely represent the remains of some sort of crustacean.

In 1870, the specimen was fully described with the new genus name Necrogammarus by Henry Woodward. The generic name means "dead lobster", deriving from Ancient Greek νεκρός (nekrós, “dead body”) and Latin gammarus ("lobster"), and the species was designated as N. salweyi, the name honoring Humphrey Salwey, who had originally discovered the fossil. Woodward agreed with Huxley's and Salter's view of the specimen as a crustacean, referring it to the order Amphipoda.

Based on the fact that the fossil appeared to preserve diplosegments (fused pairs of arthropod segments) and a uniramous limb (a limb composed of a single series of segments attached end-to-end), the geologist Ben Peach concluded that the fossil could not be of a crustacean (as their limbs are often not uniramous) and instead referred it to the class Diplopoda in 1899, classifying it as a millipede. Peach had however never examined the holotype in person (basing his diagnosis on images alone) and some researchers, such as Henry Woods in 1909, noted that its classification was still uncertain.

In 1985, John E. Almond re-examined the Necrogammarus fossil, noting that it was a fragment of a large arthropod trunk that preserved three articulated segments, the middle one being the segment that Peach had interpreted as a diplosegment. One of the segments possess a structure identified by Peach as a uniramous limb, an identification agreed upon by Almond. As the outer segments do not appear to be double nor possess any overlap of segments in addition to the complete lack of evidence of any terrestrial habits, Almond considered the genus to tentatively represent an early aquatic relative of the Uniramia subphylum of arthropods (a group that includes myriapods, hexapods and velvet worms).

Following further examination of the fossil in 1986, Paul Selden could determine that Necrogammarus actually represented the fossil remains of a pterygotid eurypterid, the specimen representing the infracapitulum (a discrete plate formed by the fusion of the palpal coxae and the labrum) and its attached palp (the second pair of appendages).

== Description and classification ==
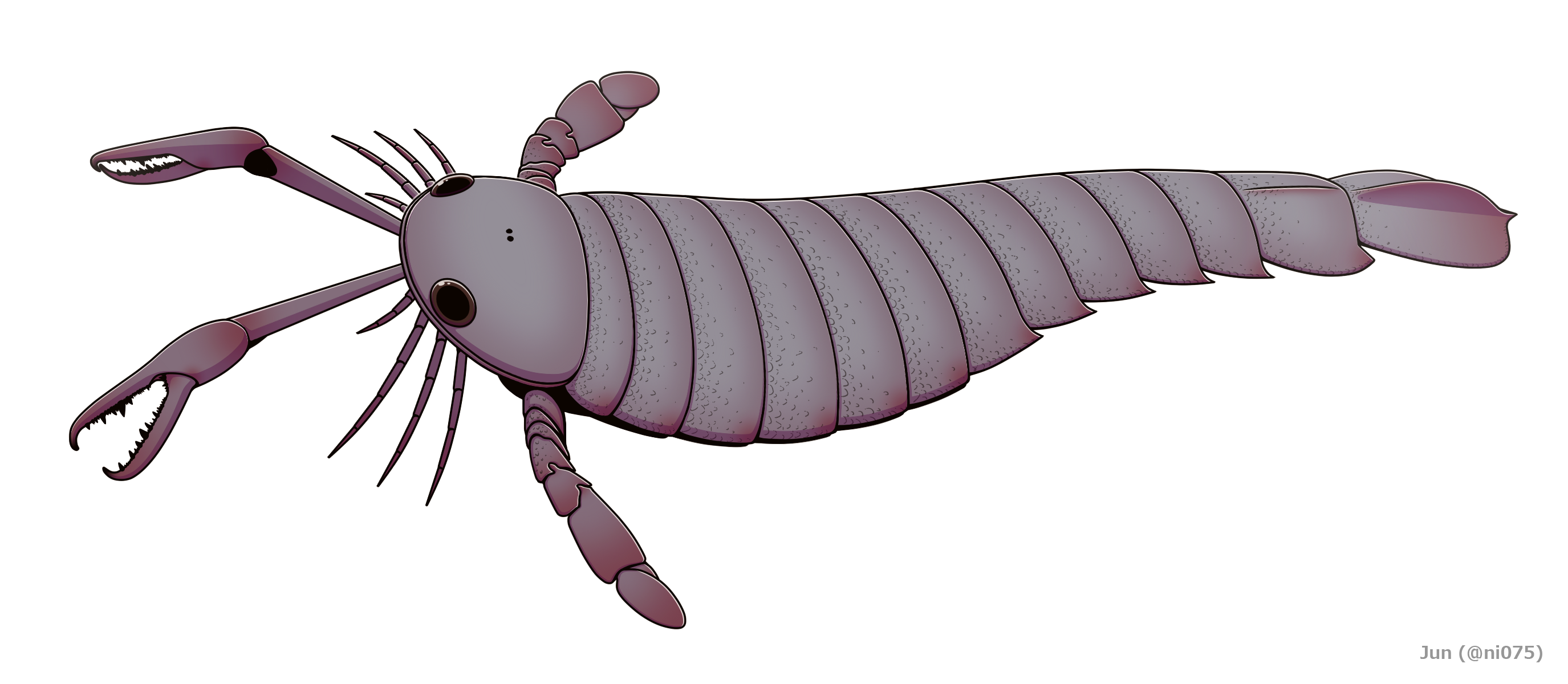
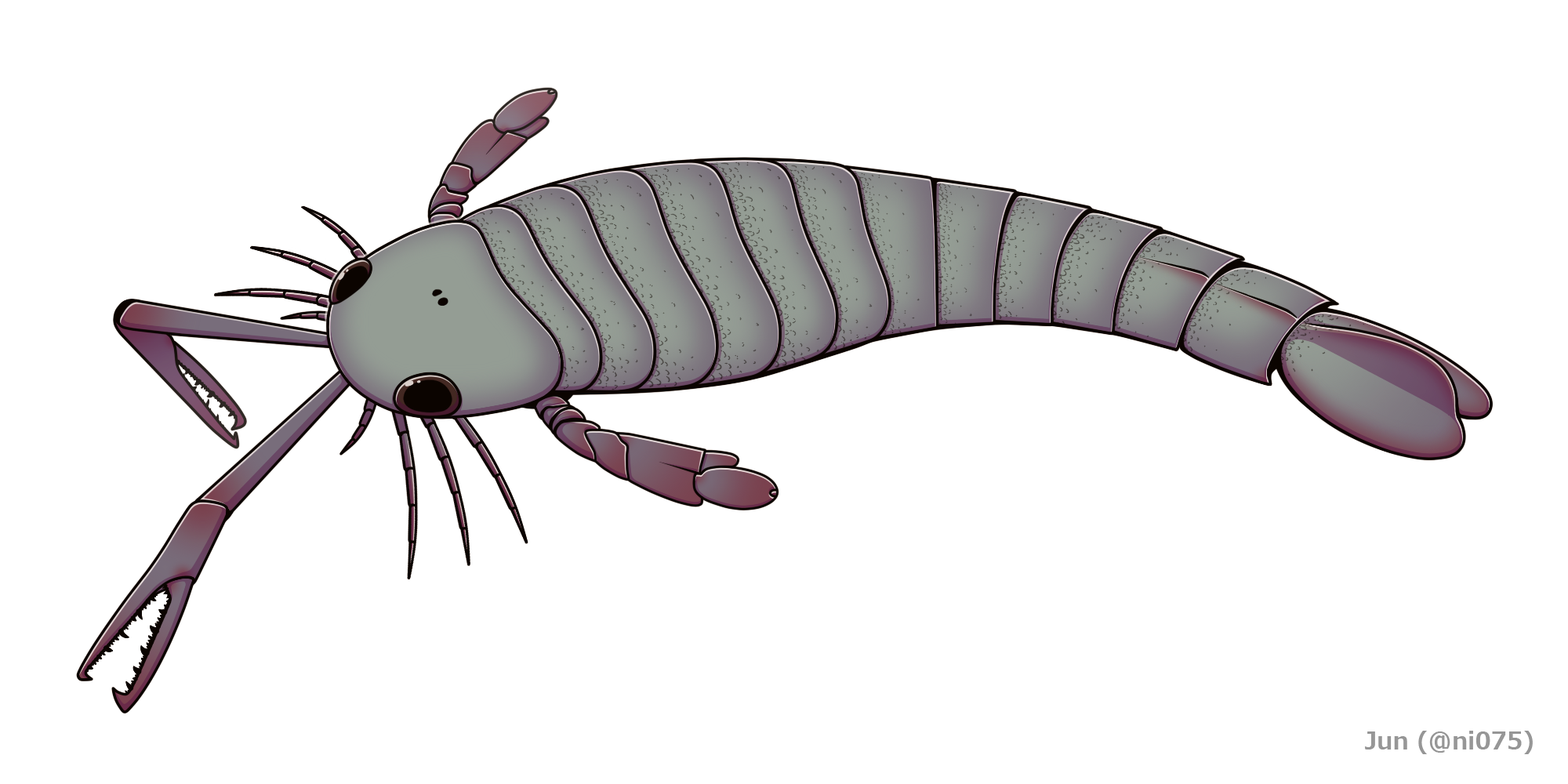
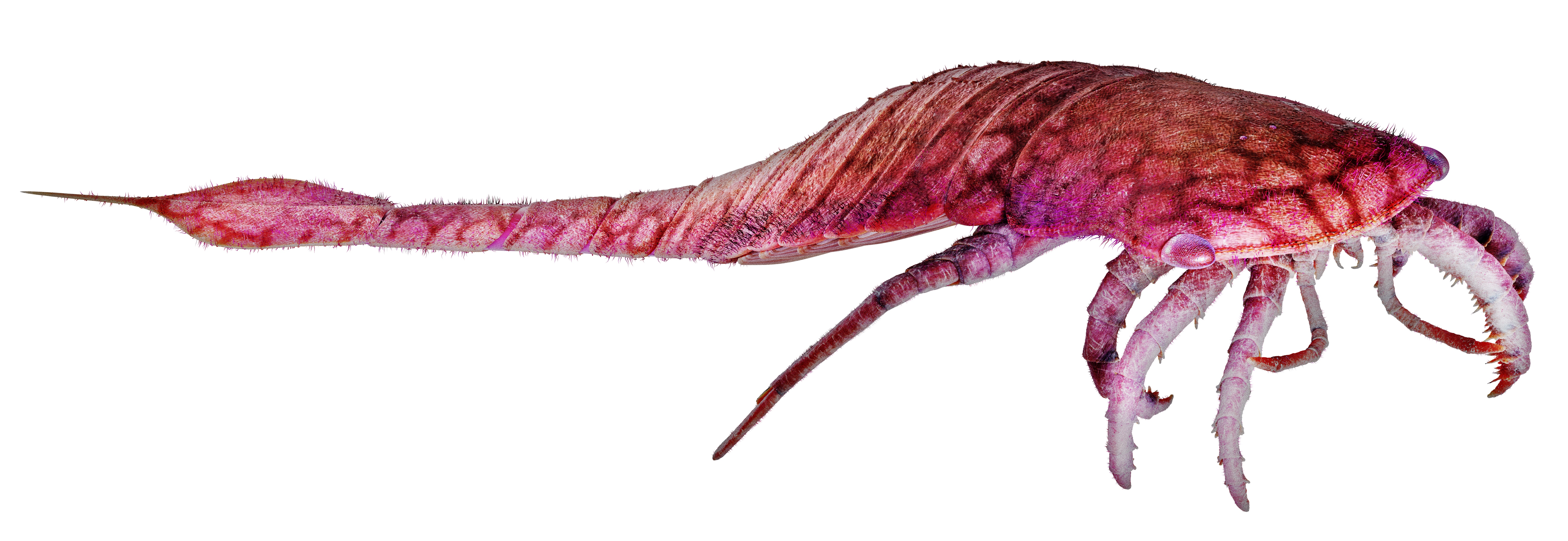
The fragmentary Necrogammarus could possibly represent a fossil of either Pterygotus (top) or Erettopterus (center). Synonymy with the non-pterygotid Slimonia (bottom) has also been suggested.

Very little can confidently be stated about Necrogammarus due to its highly fragmentary nature. Selden had immediately recognized the fossil as belonging to a pterygotid eurypterid due to recently having studied the feeding mechanism of the pterygotid Erettopterus bilobus. Erettopterus possessed only three pairs of slender walking legs (typically, eurypterids with swimming legs possess four), the first pair of walking legs being reduced to a small palp. The coxae and labrum of this palp are fused into a structure that is known as the infracapitulum. Comparison between Necrogammarus and specimens of Erettopterus reveals that Necrogammarus represents the infracapitulum and palp of a large pterygotid. The entire specimen excluding the palp measures about 70 millimetres (2.8 in) across from side to side, with the palp measuring about 45 millimetres (1.8 in). In 2023, the E. bilobus specimen that had been used for comparison with Necrogammarus was identified as specimen of Slimonia instead, which was used to suggest that Necrogammarus may be a synonym of that genus. In 2025, James Lamsdell considered Necrogammarus to be a synonym of Erettopterus, citing the Necrogammarus fossil as a closer match to Erettopterus than Pterygotus, such as preserving short individual podomeres. Lamsdell rejected the idea of synonymy with Slimonia, since the Necrogammarus fossil preserves structures unknown in that genus, and since no other Slimonia fossils are known from the site.

Two other pterygotids (and numerous unidentifiable fragments referred to the group) are known from the same locality as Necrogammarus, Pterygotus arcuatus and Erettopterus marstoni. Both of these species are moderately-sized animals, P. arcuatus reaching lengths of 60 centimetres (24 in) and E. marstoni reaching lengths of 70 centimetres (28 in). As both of these species and the genera they are assigned to are diagnosed based on features of the telson (the posteriormost segment of the body), chelicerae (frontal appendages), coxae and the metastoma (a large plate that is part of the abdomen), it is impossible to assign Necrogammarus to either since the Necrogammarus specimen lacks said body parts. It is possible that it represents a fragment of either of them or a distinct genus.

There are several features that are shared between all pterygotids and thus very likely were present in Necrogammarus as well. The outer surface of their exoskeletons was covered in an ornamentation of semilunar scales unseen in other eurypterid groups and their appendages lacked spines (unlike many other groups, particularly primitive pterygotioids). The telson was expanded and flattened and possessed a small median keel. In Pterygotus the telson ended in a short spine whilst in Erettopterus, it was indented giving a bilobed appearance. The chelicerae (the first pair of appendages), typically small and used to aid in feeding in other eurypterid groups, were robust and gigantic in pterygotids, with strong developed teeth on specialized claws. These claws are thought to have been used in prey capture.

== Paleoecology ==
Aside from Pterygotus arcuatus and Erettopterus marstoni, the Ludlow-aged sediments of the Welsh Borderland in England have also yielded other eurypterids indicative of an established eurypterid fauna, including representatives of the genera Salteropterus and Carcinosoma. Other than eurypterids, the Ludlow-aged deposits at Leintwardine have also yielded remains of several genera of extinct microplankton, as well as a diverse fauna of asterozoans (the group that includes starfish and brittle stars) compromising at least 16 distinct species. Other local fauna includes xiphosurans, phyllocarids, crinoids, echinoids and ophiocistioids. The environment appears to have mainly been sub-marine, with deposits indicating that the local fauna lived in channels connected to a larger body of water.

== See also ==
- List of eurypterid genera
- Timeline of eurypterid research
- Pterygotidae
- Pterygotus
- Erettopterus
