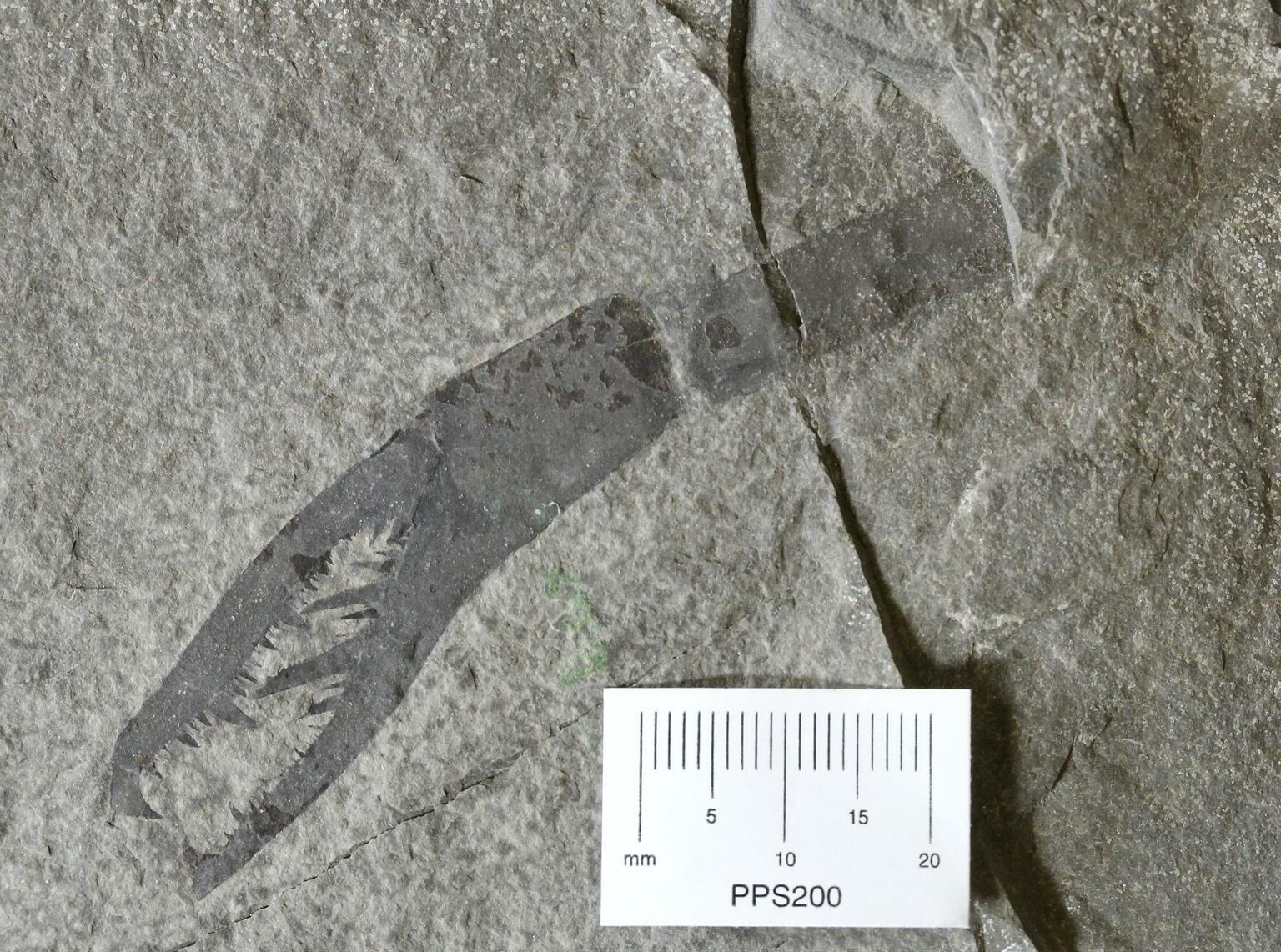
- Fossil chelicera of Acutiramus cummingsi. The massive chelicerae of the pterygotids were their primary distinguishing feature.
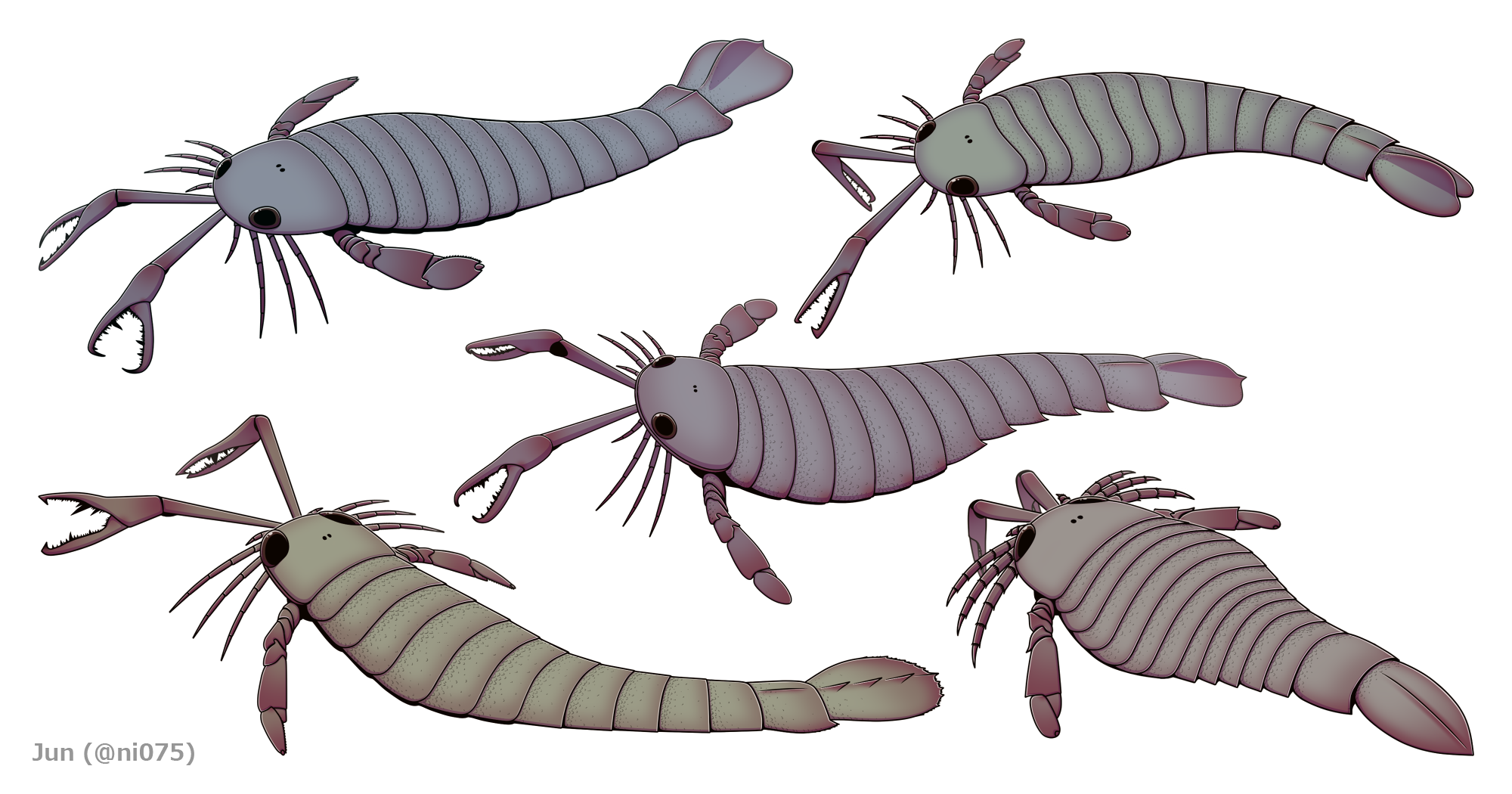
- Left to right, top to bottom: Jaekelopterus rhenaniae, Erettopterus bilobus, Pterygotus anglicus, Acutiramus macrophthalmus, and the ciurcopterid Ciurcopterus ventricosus.

Scientific classification
- Kingdom: Animalia
- Phylum: Arthropoda
- Subphylum: Chelicerata
- Order: †Eurypterida
- Infraorder: †Diploperculata
- Superfamily: †Pterygotioidea
- Family: †Pterygotidae; Clarke & Ruedemann, 1912

Type species
- †Pterygotus anglicus Agassiz, 1844

Genera
- †Acutiramus; †Erettopterus; †Jaekelopterus; †Pterygotus; Nomina dubia: †Necrogammarus

Synonyms
- Jaekelopteridae Størmer, 1974

= Pterygotidae =

Pterygotidae Temporal range: Late Silurian – Late Devonian, 428.2–372.2 Ma

Extinct family of eurypterids

Pterygotidae (the name deriving from the type genus Pterygotus, meaning "winged one") is a family of eurypterids, an extinct group of aquatic arthropods. They were members of the superfamily Pterygotioidea. Pterygotids were the largest known arthropods to have ever lived with some members of the family, such as Jaekelopterus and Acutiramus, exceeding 2 metres (6.6 ft) in length. Their fossilized remains have been recovered in deposits ranging in age from 428 to 372 million years old (Late Silurian to Late Devonian).

One of the most successful groups of eurypterids, the pterygotids were the only eurypterid family to achieve a truly worldwide distribution. Several evolutionary innovations made the pterygotids unique among the eurypterids, with large and flattened telsons (the posteriormost division of the body) likely used as rudders to provide additional agility and enlarged chelicerae (frontal appendages) with claws. These claws were robust and possessed teeth which would have made many members of the group formidable predators. The strange proportions and large size of the pterygotid eurypterids led to the quarrymen who discovered the first fossil remains of the group to give them the common name "Seraphims".

Studies on the cheliceral morphology and compound eyes of the pterygotids have revealed that the members of the group, despite overall morphological similarities, were highly divergent in their ecological roles. Pterygotid ecology ranged from generalized predatory behaviour in basal members of the group, such as Erettopterus, to active apex predators, such as Jaekelopterus and Pterygotus, and ambush predators and scavengers, such as Acutiramus.

Some researchers have suggested that the pterygotid eurypterids evolved in something akin to an "arms race" with early vertebrates, that the evolution of heavy armor in the ostracoderms could be attributed to pressure from pterygotid predation and that later pterygotid decline could be attributed to subsequent evolutionary trends in fish. This hypothesis is mostly considered as far too simplistic of an explanation by modern researchers. Detailed analyses have failed to find any correlation between the extinction of the pterygotids and the diversification of the vertebrates.

== Description ==
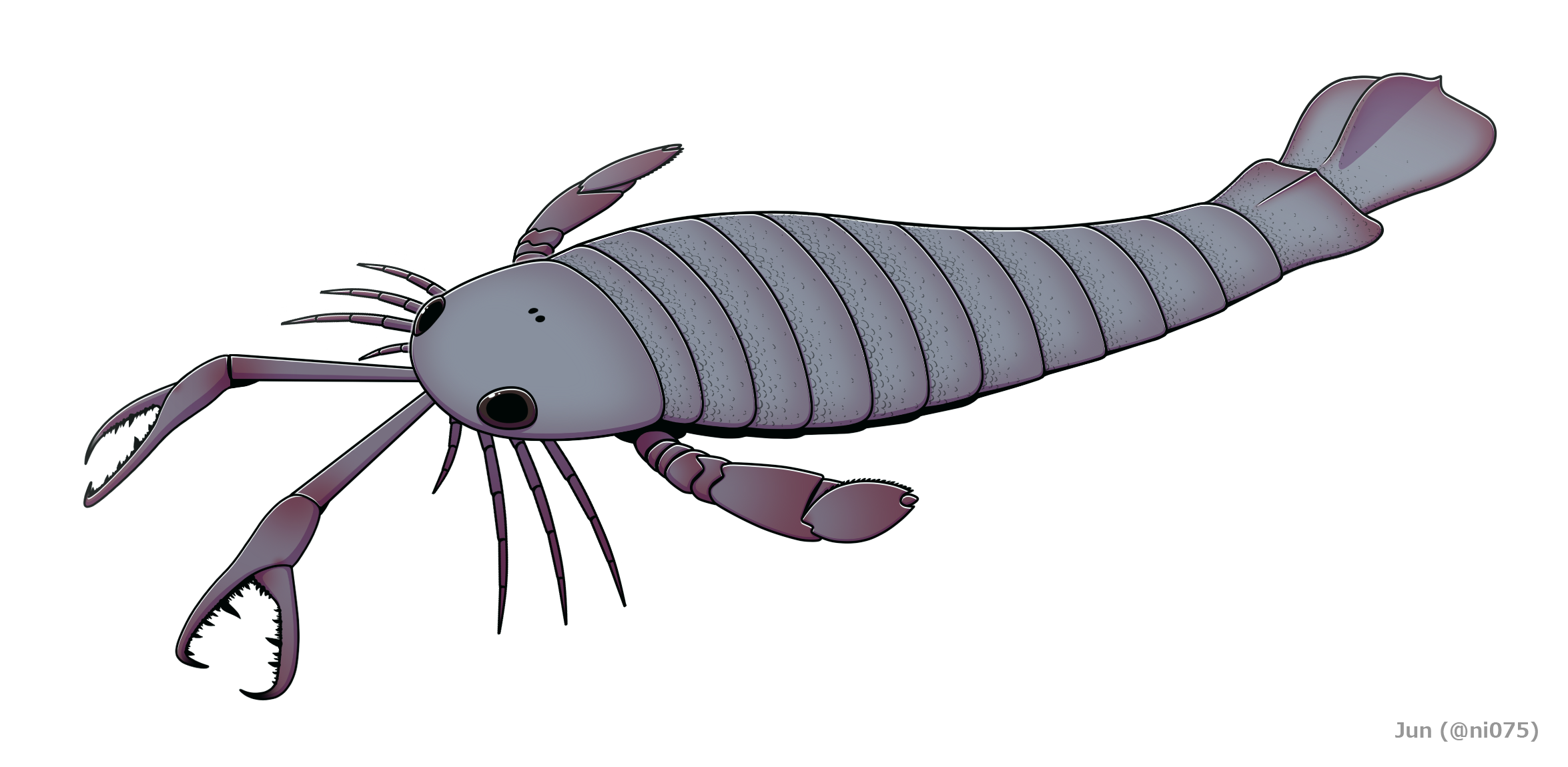
Reconstruction of Jaekelopterus.

Pterygotid eurypterids, which occur in strata ranging from Late Silurian to Late Devonian in age, ranged in size from quite small animals, such as Acutiramus floweri at 20 cm (7.9 in), to the largest known arthropods to have ever lived. Several species reached and exceeded 2 metres in length, the largest known species including Jaekelopterus rhenaniae at 2.5 metres and Acutiramus bohemicus at 2.1 metres.

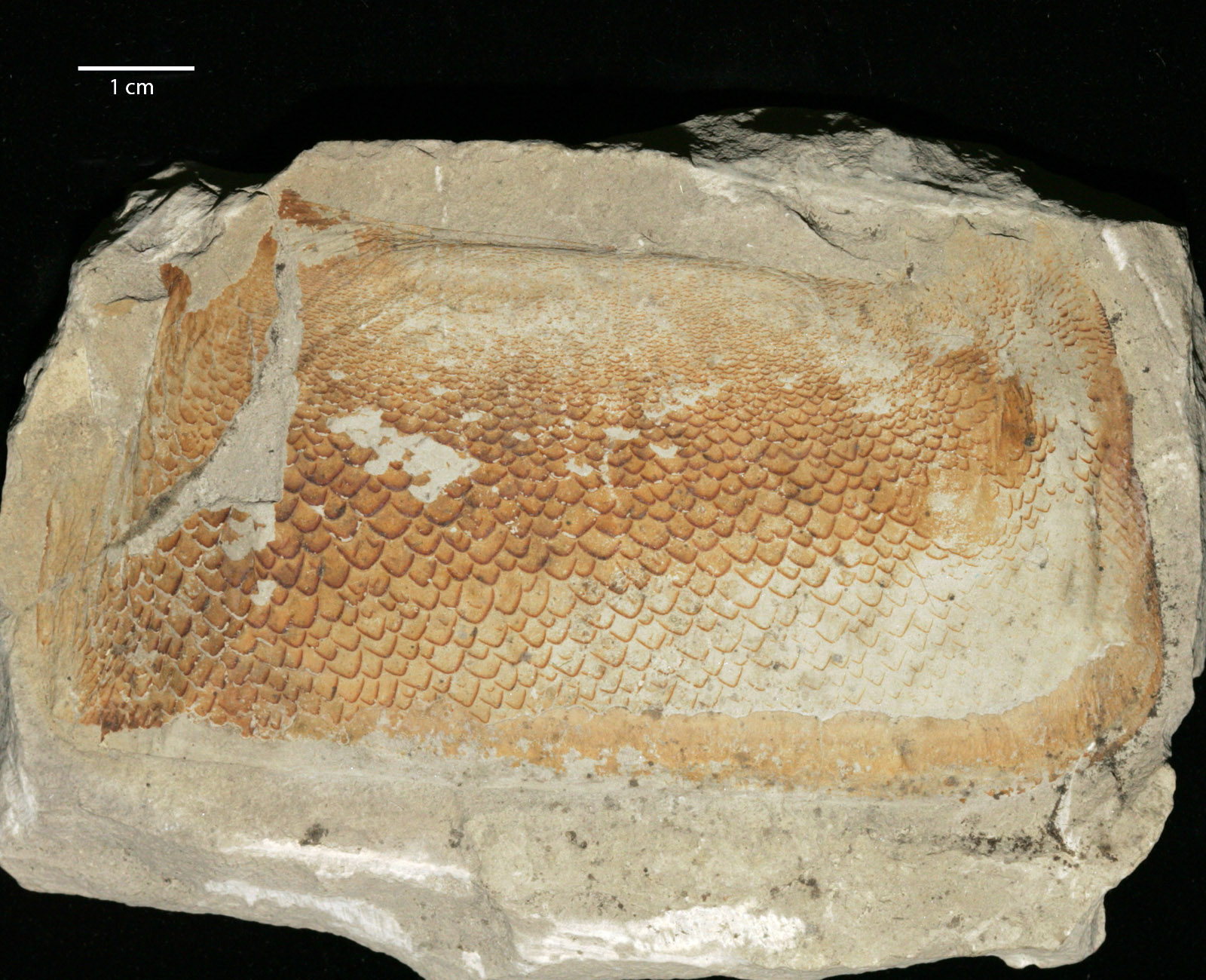
Fossil segment of Erettopterus osiliensis, showcasing the distinct scale-like ornamentation of the pterygotids.

Like all other chelicerates, and other arthropods in general, pterygotid eurypterids possessed segmented bodies and jointed appendages (limbs) covered in a cuticle composed of proteins and chitin. In pterygotids, the outer surface of the exoskeletons, ranging in size from small to gigantic, was composed of semilunar scales. The chelicerate body is divided into two tagmata (sections); the frontal prosoma (head) and posterior opisthosoma (abdomen). The appendages were attached to the prosoma, and were characterized in pterygotids by being small and slender and lacking spines. The telson (the posteriormost division of the body) was expanded and flattened with a small median keel. The posterior margin (tip) of the telson forms a short spine in some genera (Pterygotus and Acutiramus) and is indented (giving a bilobed appearance) in others (Erettopterus).

Like other chelicerates, pterygotids possessed chelicerae. These appendages are the only ones that appear before the mouth and take the form of small pincers used to feed in all other eurypterid groups. In the pterygotids, the chelicerae were large and long, with strong well developed teeth on specialised chelae (claws). These specialised chelicerae, likely used for prey capture but differing in the exact role from genus to genus, are also the primary feature that distinguishes members of the group from eurypterids of the other pterygotioid families, Slimonidae and Hughmilleriidae, and other eurypterids in general.

== History of research ==
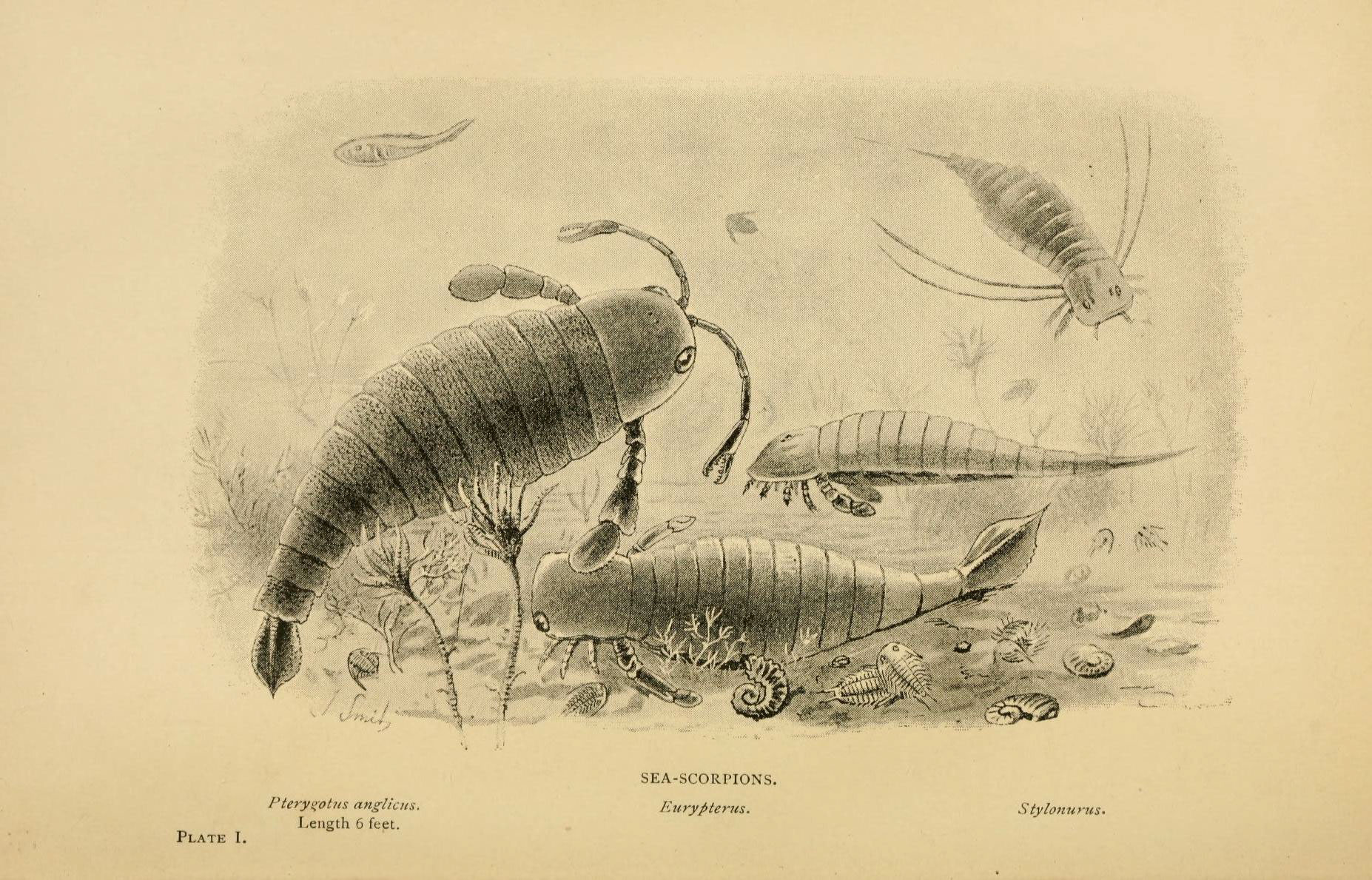
Pterygotus and other eurypterids illustrated by Joseph Smit in 1896.

Due to their unique features within the Eurypterida, Pterygotidae has attracted a lot of attention ever since their discovery. The first fossils found, discovered by quarrymen in Scotland, were referred to as "Seraphims" by the quarrymen. When describing Pterygotus itself in 1839, Louis Agassiz first thought the fossils represented remains of fish, with the name meaning "winged one", and only recognized their nature as arthropod remains five years later in 1844.

By 1859, 10 species (many of which would later be reassigned) had been assigned to Pterygotus. John William Salter recognized that it was possible to divide Pterygotus based on the morphology of the telsons of the species that had been assigned to it. He divided Pterygotus into subgenera, erecting Pterygotus (Erettopterus) for species with a bilobed telson.

The family Pterygotidae was erected in 1912 by John Mason Clarke & Rudolf Ruedemann to constitute a group for the genera Pterygotus, Slimonia, Hastimima and Hughmilleria. Pterygotus would also designated as containing two "subgenera", Pterygotus (Curviramus) and Pterygotus (Acutiramus) in 1935, differentiated by the curvature of the denticles (teeth) of the chelicerae. The same year (1935), Leif Størmer named a new pterygotid genus, Grossopterus, and split Pterygotus into two other subgenera, Pterygotus (Pterygotus) and Pterygotus (Erettopterus), designating Pterygotus (Curviramus) as a junior synonym of Pterygotus (Pterygotus) and not recognizing Pterygotus (Acutiramus). A division into three subgenera of Pterygotus was proposed by Ferdinand Prantl and Alois Přibyl in 1948, retaining P. (Erettopterus) and P. (Pterygotus) but also restoring P. (Acutiramus) to subgenus level.

Erik N. Kjellesvig-Waering emended the family in 1951, when the genera Hastimima, Hughmilleria, Grossopterus and Slimonia were referred to their own family, the Hughmilleriidae, which left Pterygotus as the only genus within the Pterygotidae. In 1961, Kjellesvig-Waering raised Erettopterus to the level of its own genus, recognizing two subgenera of Pterygotus; P. (Pterygotus) and P. (Acutiramus), as well as two subgenera of Erettopterus; E. (Erettopterus) and E. (Truncatiramus). Kjellesvig-Waering placed the primary taxonomical value on the morphology of the telson, considering potential differences in the chelicerae and metastoma (a large plate that is part of the abdomen) to be secondary in importance.

Jaekelopterus, previously designated as a species of Pterygotus, was separated into a distinct genus in 1964 based on the supposed different segmentation of the genital appendage. These supposed differences would later turn out to be false, but briefly prompted Jaekelopterus to be classified within a family of its own, the "Jaekelopteridae". The error with the genital appendage was later discovered and rectified, making Jaekelopterus a member of the Pterygotidae once more. In 1974, Størmer raised the Pterygotus subgenera Acutiramus and Truncatiramus to the level of separate genera. Truncatiramus has later been recognized as representing a synonym of Erettopterus.

In 1986, Paul Selden examined the fossil material of the enigmatic arthropod Necrogammarus and concluded that the specimen represents the infracapitulum and attached palp of a large pterygotid. The fossil likely belongs to either Erettopterus marstoni or Pterygotus arcuatus, both found in the same locality, but the lack of key diagnostic features in the Necrogammarus remains makes assignment to either impossible, and therefore, Necrogammarus is considered an unspecified pterygotid.

In 2009, Pterygotus ventricosus was recognized as being distinct from, and far more basal than, other species in its genus and was thus named as the type species of a new genus, Ciurcopterus. Studies of specimens referred to this genus resolved long-standing contentiousness about the precise phylogenetic position of the Pterygotidae, providing evidence in the form of shared characteristics that Slimonia, not Herefordopterus or Hughmilleria as previously thought, was the closest sister taxon of the group. However, in a 2025 paper Ciurcopterus was separated out from Pterygotidae and placed in a new family, Ciurcopteridae, recovered as the sister taxon of Pterygotidae.

== Evolutionary history ==
The pterygotids were one of the most successful eurypterid groups, with fossilised remains having been discovered on all continents except Antarctica. They are the only eurypterid group with a cosmopolitan distribution. Their remains range in age from 428 to 372 million years old (for a total temporal range of approximately 56 million years), reaching their greatest diversity during the Late Silurian, a period in time when other eurypterid groups became increasingly diverse as well. The enlargement and specialisation of the chelicerae within the Pterygotidae has been recognised as one of the two most striking evolutionary innovations within the Eurypterida, besides the transformation of the most posterior prosomal appendage into a swimming paddle (a trait seen in all eurypterids in the Eurypterina suborder).

=== Potential influence in vertebrate evolution ===
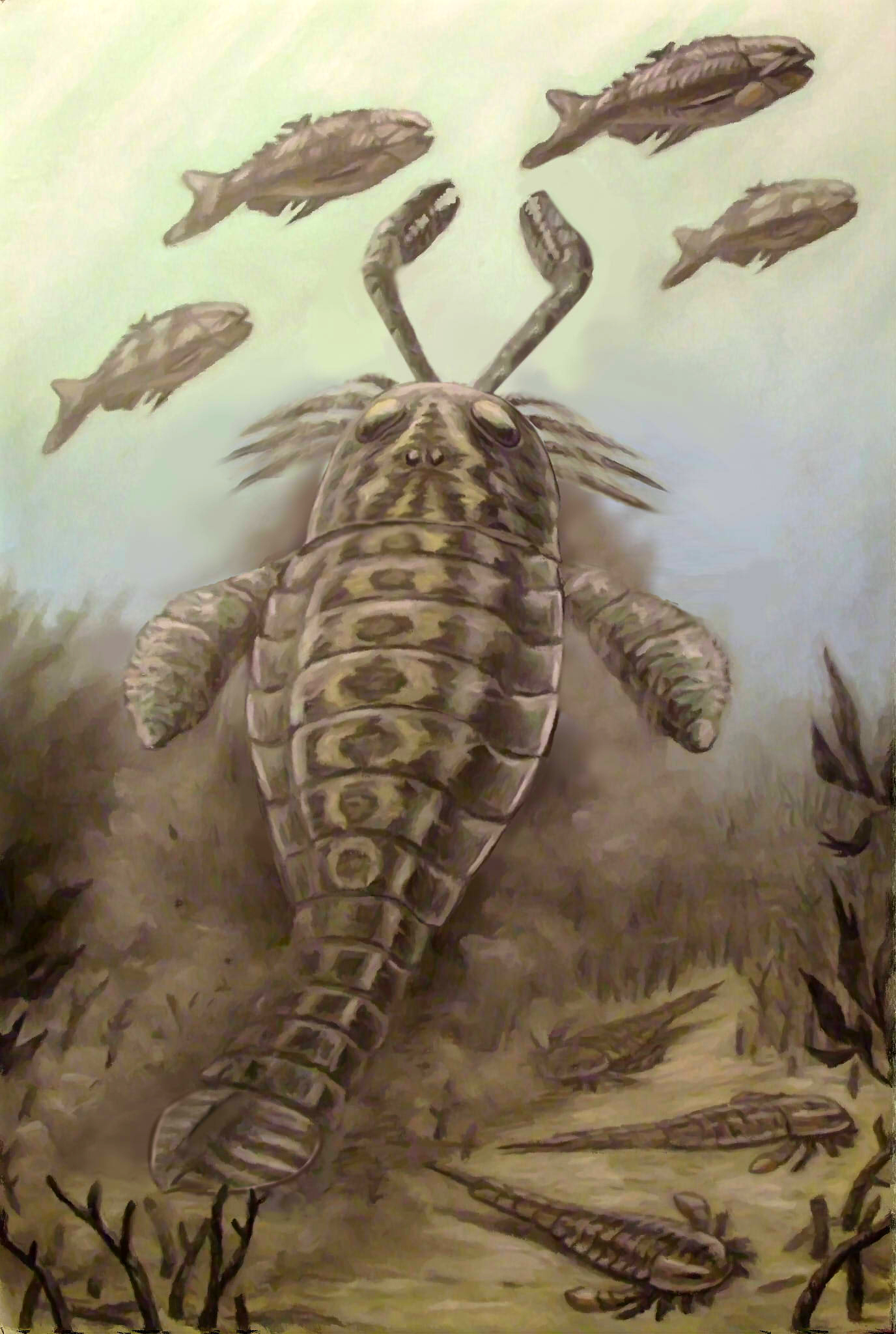
Restoration of Pterygotus hunting Birkenia.

Alfred S. Romer suggested in 1933 that early vertebrate evolution might have been heavily influenced by pterygotid predation. Early vertebrates of the Late Silurian and Devonian are often heavily armored, and it is likely that this represents an ancestral vertebrate trait that was later lost or reduced, rather than something that evolved separately in several groups at the same time. Some researchers have suggested that the armor was to protect against hitting rocky surfaces in fast flowing streams, but Romer pointed out that there is no such armor protection in modern fish that live in that type of environment. Instead, Romer stated that the only reasonable explanation for the armor was as "a protection against living enemies".

With most of the early vertebrates of the Silurian being just a few decimetres in length and often occurring together with pterygotid eurypterids in freshwater environments, they would seem to represent appropriate prey for the pterygotids, which were large predators with grasping claws. There are few other animals that would present appropriate prey and there are virtually no other predators than the pterygotids that would warrant the evolution of armored protection in their prey. The pterygotids reached their maximum size and number in the Late Silurian and Early Devonian, after which they saw rapid decline during the Devonian. This decline occurred at around the same time as there was an increase in unarmored vertebrates as well as a growth in fish size and the increased migration of fish into marine environments. The Devonian would also see the evolution of significantly faster-moving fish and the evolution of proper jaws. These adaptations, potentially a result of pterygotid predation, would have significantly affected the likelihood of fish representing pterygotid prey and larger predatory fish may even have begun preying on pterygotids and other eurypterids, contributing to their decline and extinction.

The arguments of Romer were based on evolutionary trends in both groups and the fossil co-occurrences of both groups but he did not present a detailed analysis. The groups do frequently occur together, with pterygotids present at more than two-thirds of fossil localities where eurypterids and fish are recorded together. There is also a recorded increase in fish diversity at the same time as the eurypterids began to decline in the early Devonian, but available data does not support any direct competitive replacement. Though the pterygotids would be extinct at that point, both fish and eurypterids would decline in the Middle Devonian only to peak again in the late Devonian and to begin another decline in the Permian. Detailed analyses have failed to find any correlation between the extinction of the pterygotids and the diversification of the vertebrates.

== Paleobiology ==
=== Cheliceral claws ===
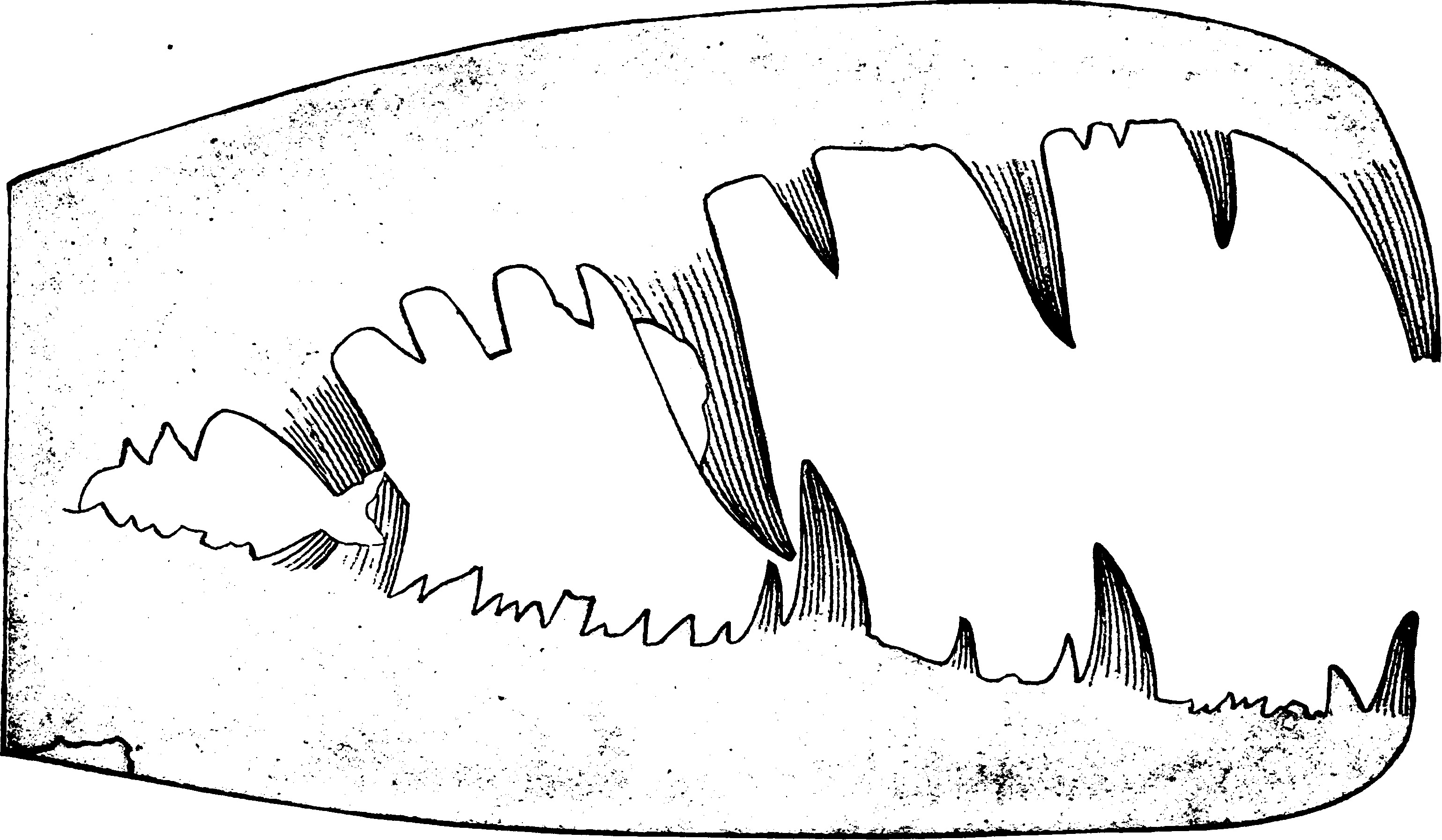
Chela (cheliceral claw) of Pterygotus.

The function of pterygotid chelicerae was likely the same as the chelicerae of other eurypterids as well as those of other arthropods, such as crustaceans and xiphosurans; the capture and cutting of food into smaller pieces and transport of food into the mouth as well as defense. Though most other eurypterid families had simple pincers, the Pterygotidae is the only eurypterid family to possess enlarged and robust chelicerae with claws and teeth, showing unique adaptations to defense and/or prey capture. The chelicerae were composed of several joints, though the exact number is somewhat controversial with some researchers stating three, others four and some claiming that the number of joints varies between three and five depending on the species and genus in question (Pterygotus would have three joints and Erettopterus five). The most common interpretation historically was that the number of joints were three, with a long basal joint followed by two smaller distal joints with teeth. More modern research on very complete specimens of Acutiramus and Erettopterus has revealed that the actual count appears to be four joints. Additionally, a three-joint anatomy would have placed the claws at the end of appendages that would essentially have been rigid stalks, rendering their function useless. To have the necessary mobility, the pterygotid chelicerae would have had to have been composed of four joints.

The first joint of the chelicerae, where it connects to the epistoma (a plate located on the prosoma, or "head"), would have been capable of turning the entire appendage in a twisting way, which has led researchers to conclude that the function of the chelicerae would not have been only, or even primarily, for defense but rather to capture and convey food to the mouth. When captured, prey would need to be broken into smaller pieces to be able to fit into the mouth; eurypterid mouths were even less adapted to devour large pieces than mouths of modern crabs are. The eurypterid walking appendages could not cut, transport or grasp anything, and as such this would also be done with the chelicerae. In crabs, the claws tear food apart and then transport the smaller pieces to the mouth. Based on the feeding process seen in modern arthropods with chelicerae, one of the claws would hold the prey while the other would cut off pieces and transport it to the mouth with continuous and simple movements.

=== Telson ===
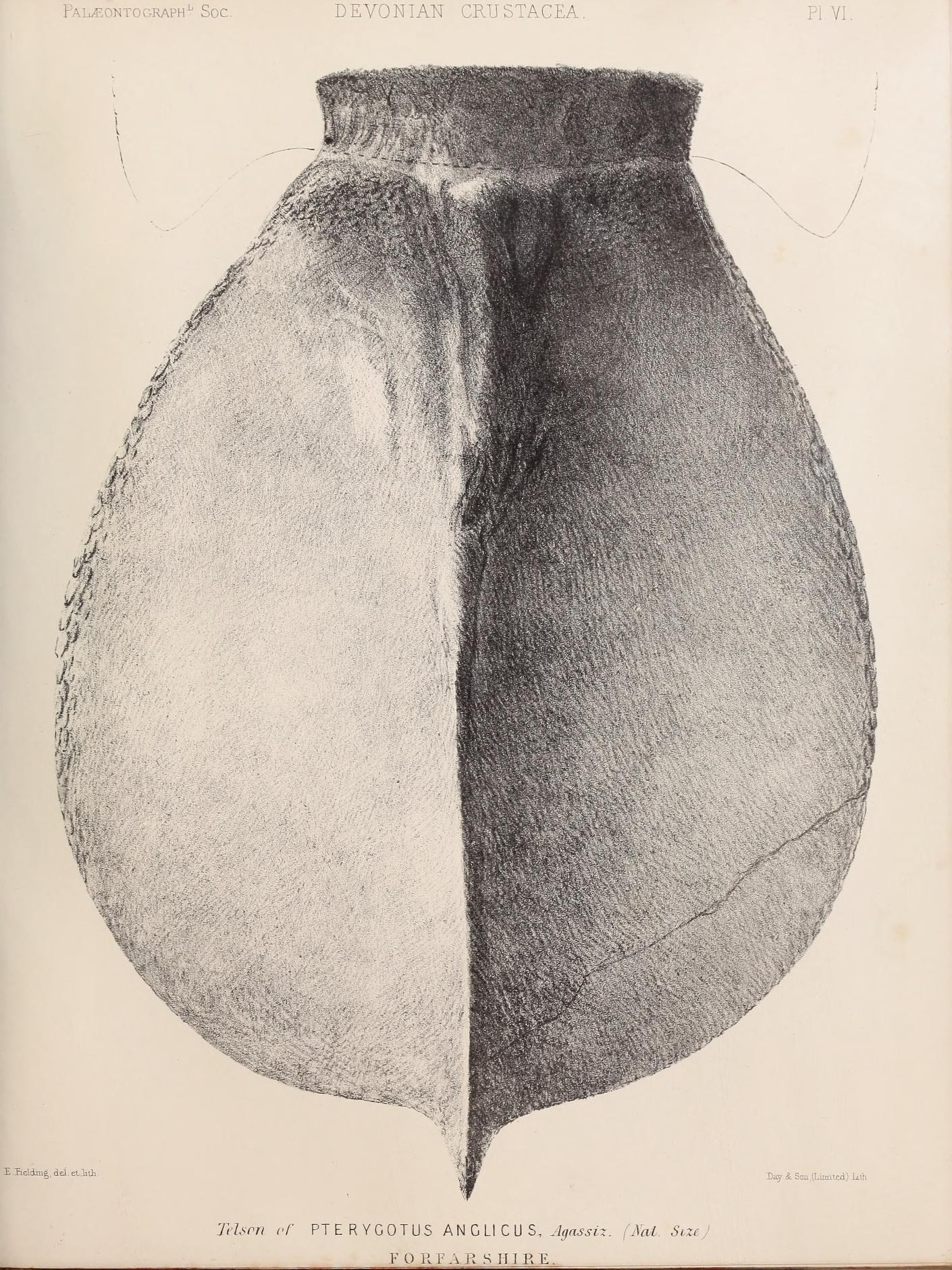
Telson of Pterygotus.

The large and flattened pterygotid telson is a distinctive feature of the group that is only shared by the closely related Slimonia and by the derived hibbertopterid Hibbertopterus and mycteroptid Hastimima, where a flattened telson had convergently evolved. The telson is in general flat but with a raised thin median keel. The posterior margin (tip) of the telson form a short spine in some genera, such as Pterygotus and Acutiramus, and is indented (giving a bilobed appearance) in Erettopterus. The function of these specialised telsons has historically been controversial and disputed. Erik N. Kjellesvig-Waering compared the pterygotid telson to the large tail fluke of whales in 1964. The pterygotids were hypothesized to have moved by undulating the entire opisthosoma (the large posterior section of the body) by moving the abdominal plates, as such undulations of the opisthosoma and telson would have acted as the propulsive method of the animal, rendering the swimming legs used by other eurypterid groups useless. What is known of eurypterid anatomy contradicts the undulation hypothesis simply because eurypterid bodies were likely very stiff. The body segments were nearly equal in width and thickness with little difference in size between segments directly adjoining to each other, while there is no evidence for any sort of tapering or other mechanism that would have increased flexibility. Any flexing of the body would require muscular contractions, but no major apodemes (internal ridges of the exoskeleton that supports muscular attachments) or any muscle scars indicative of large opisthosomal muscles have been found. Instead, pterygotids were most likely propelled by the enlarged and flattened paddlelike sixth pair of prosomal appendages, like other swimming eurypterids.

An alternate hypothesis first proposed by C. D. Waterston in 1979 postulates that the median keel and the telson at large was used to steer the body, working more like a vertical and horizontal rudder than a tail fluke. Calculations and the creation of models of plaster allowed Plotnick et al. (1988) to determine that the design of the pterygotid telson could functionally work as a rudder, which would have enabled the pterygotids to be agile animals capable of quick turns when chasing after prey.

=== Gigantism ===
Size comparison of the largest recognized species of each pterygotid genus (and Ciurcopterus) known from reasonably extensive fossil material.

The Pterygotidae includes the largest known arthropods to have ever lived, with several species surpassing two metres in length (such as Jaekelopterus rhenaniae at 2.5 metres and Acutiramus bohemicus at 2.1 metres). There are several known factors that restrict the size arthropods are able to grow to. These factors include respiration, the energy it costs to moult, locomotion and the properties of the exoskeleton. Except the cheliceral claws, which are robust and heavily sclerotized, a majority of fossilized large pterygotid body segments are unmineralized and thin. Even the plates that form the surface of the abdominal segments, the stergites and sternites, are preserved as paper-thin compressions which suggests that pterygotids were very light-weight in construction. Similar adaptations have been observed in other prehistoric giant arthropods, such as Arthropleura, and may be vital to the evolution of arthropod gigantism as a light-weight build decreases the influence of size-restricting factors.

Though they were the largest arthropods known to have ever existed, the light-weight build of the pterygotids means that they are unlikely to have been the heaviest. Giant eurypterids of other lineages, notably the deep-bodied walking forms of the Hibbertopteridae, such as the almost 2 metre long Hibbertopterus, might have rivalled the pterygotids in weight, if not surpassed them.

== Classification ==
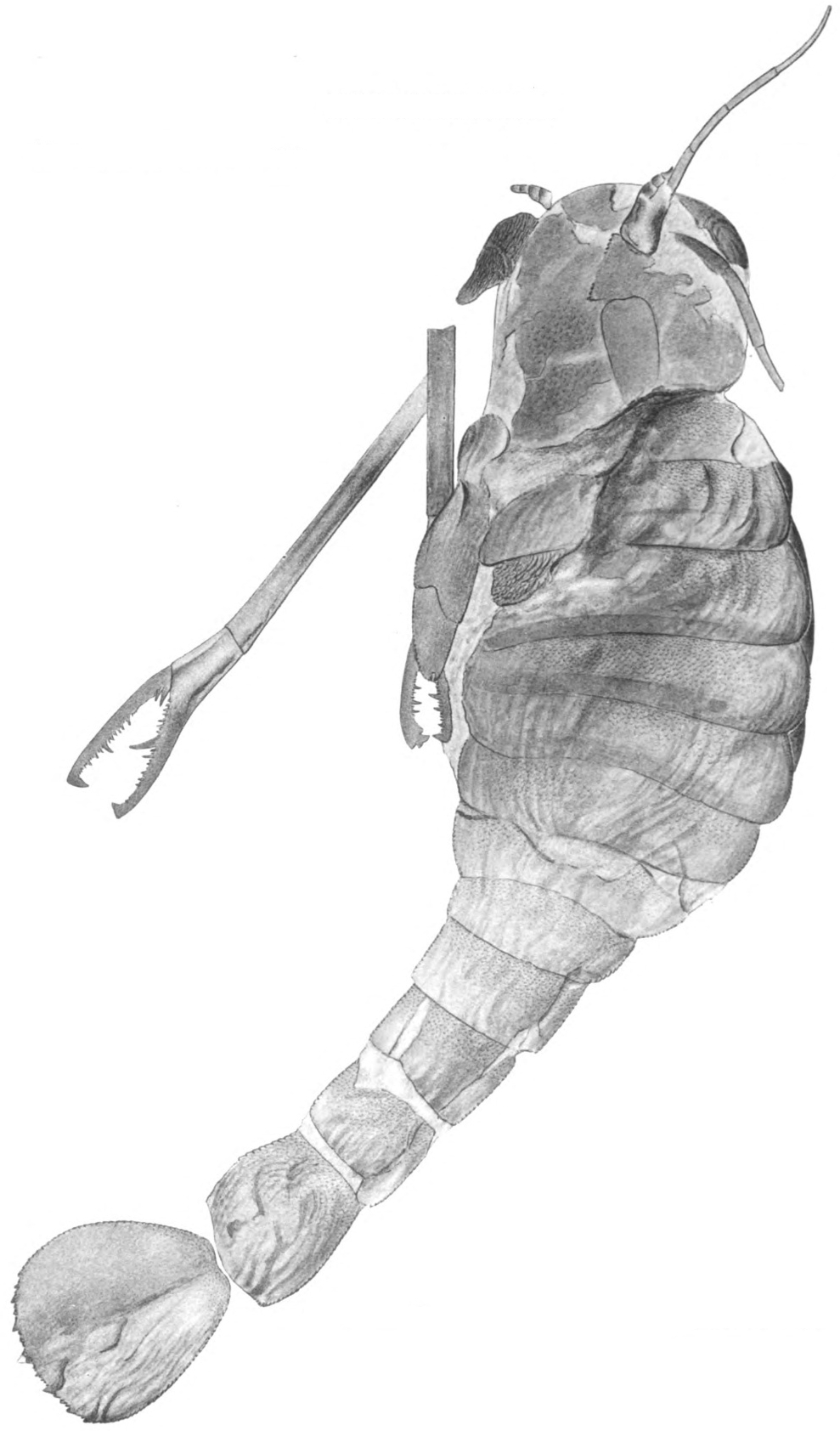
Illustration of a fossilized Acutiramus.

=== Taxonomy ===
Since its creation by John Mason Clarke & Rudolf Ruedemann in 1912, the phylogenetic status of the Pterygotidae has changed several times. Leif Størmer considered the group to represent a family within the eurypterid superfamily Eurypteracea. In 1962, Nestor Ivanovich Novojilov raised the groups in question to subordinal and superfamily status, Eurypteracea becoming the suborder Eurypterina and creating the superfamily Pterygotioidea.

Both Størmer (in 1974) and Erik N. Kjellesvig-Waering (in 1964) would come to consider the pterygotids as distinctive enough, due to their uniquely enlarged chelicerae, to warrant the status of a separate suborder, which was dubbed the "Pterygotina". More modern cladistics and phylogenetic analyses does not support the classification of the pterygotids as a suborder, but classifies them within the superfamily Pterygotioidea as the most derived members of the suborder Eurypterina.

The cladogram below is simplified from a study by Tetlie (2007), showcasing the derived position of the pterygotids within Eurypterina.

- Eurypterida
  - - Stylonurina
  - Eurypterina
    - Megalograptoidea
    - - Eurypteroidea
      - - Carcinosomatoidea
        - - Waeringopteroidea
          - - Adelophthalmoidea
            - Pterygotioidea
              - Hughmilleria
              - - Herefordopterus
                - - Slimonia
                  - - Pterygotidae

=== Internal phylogeny ===
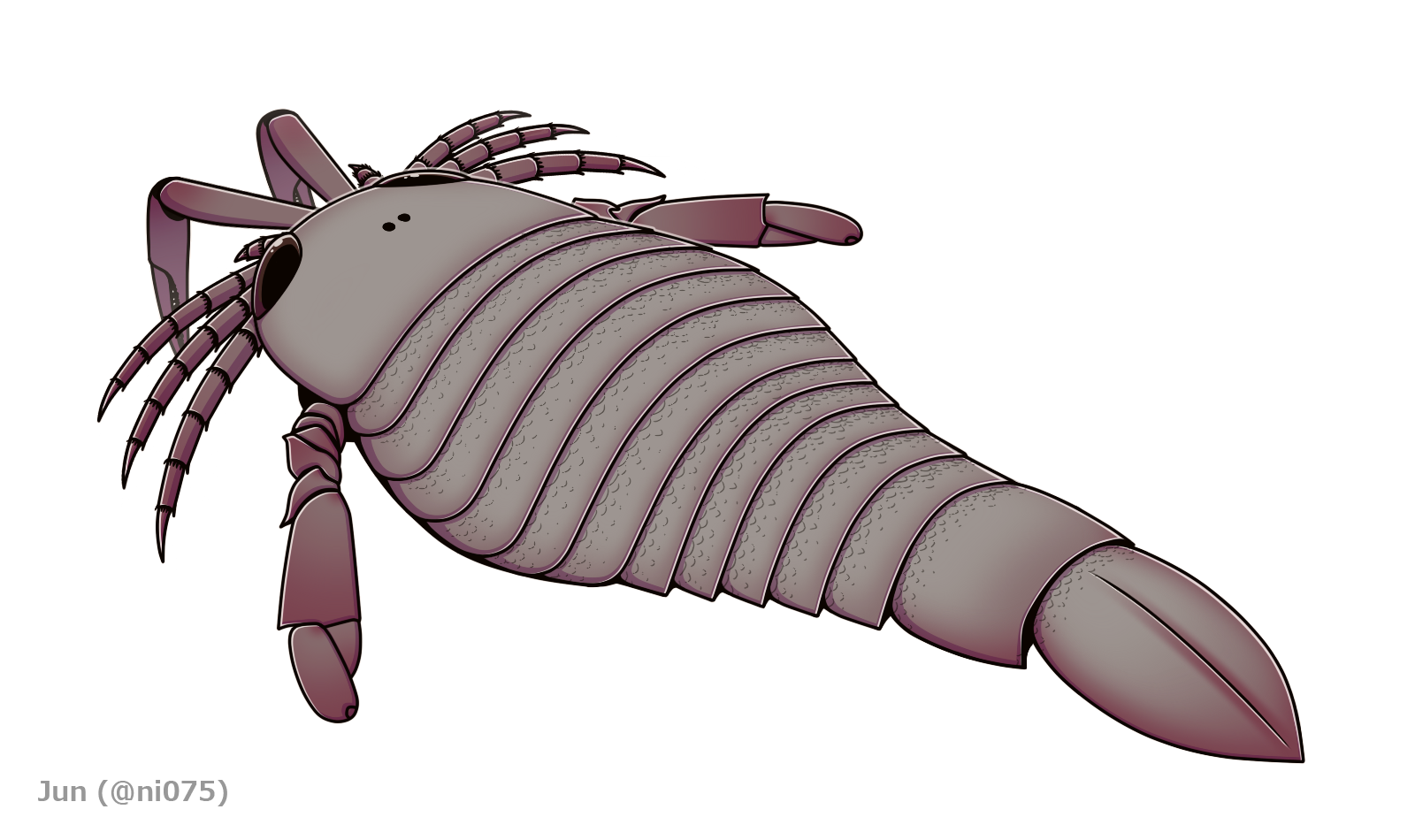
Reconstruction of Ciurcopterus, the sister taxon of Pterygotidae

The clade Pterygotidae is among the best supported within the Eurypterida. Relationships within it has historically been difficult to resolve due to wrong interpretations of genital appendage of Jaekelopterus, and the consequential disturbance of character states historically interpreted as primitive and derived within the group when the error was solved. Subsequent descriptions and redescriptions have ensured that the phylogeny of the clade is rather robust at the genus level. Yet, a comprehensive species-level phylogenetic analysis has proven impossible due to the large amount of species based on scant and fragmentary fossilised material. The genus Slimonia is thought to represent the sister group to the pterygotids.

The cladogram below is based on the nine best-known pterygotid species and two outgroup taxa (Slimonia acuminata and Hughmilleria socialis). The cladogram also contains the primary unifying characteristics for the various clades, as well as the maximum sizes reached by the species in question, which have been suggested to possibly have been an evolutionary trait of the group per Cope's rule ("phyletic gigantism").

- Pterygotioidea
  - Hughmilleria socialis (20 cm, 8 in)
  - - Slimonia acuminata (100 cm, 3 ft 3 in)
    - - - Ciurcopterus ventricosus (70 cm, 2 ft 4 in)
        - Pterygotidae
          - (Note: Bilobed telson, undifferentiated denticles)
            - Erettopterus waylandsmithi (60 cm, 2 ft)
            - Erettopterus osiliensis (90 cm, 2 ft 11 in)
            - - Erettopterus serricaudatus (60 cm, 2 ft)
              - Erettopterus bilobus (70 cm, 2 ft 4 in)
          - (Note: Telson with a posterior spine)
            - Pterygotus anglicus (160 cm, 5 ft 3 in)
            - (Note: Large angular denticle on the fixed ramus of the chelicerae)
              - Jaekelopterus rhenaniae (250 cm, 8 ft 2 in)
              - - Acutiramus macrophthalmus (200 cm, 6 ft 7 in)
                - Acutiramus bohemicus (210 cm, 6 ft 11 in)

== Paleoecology ==
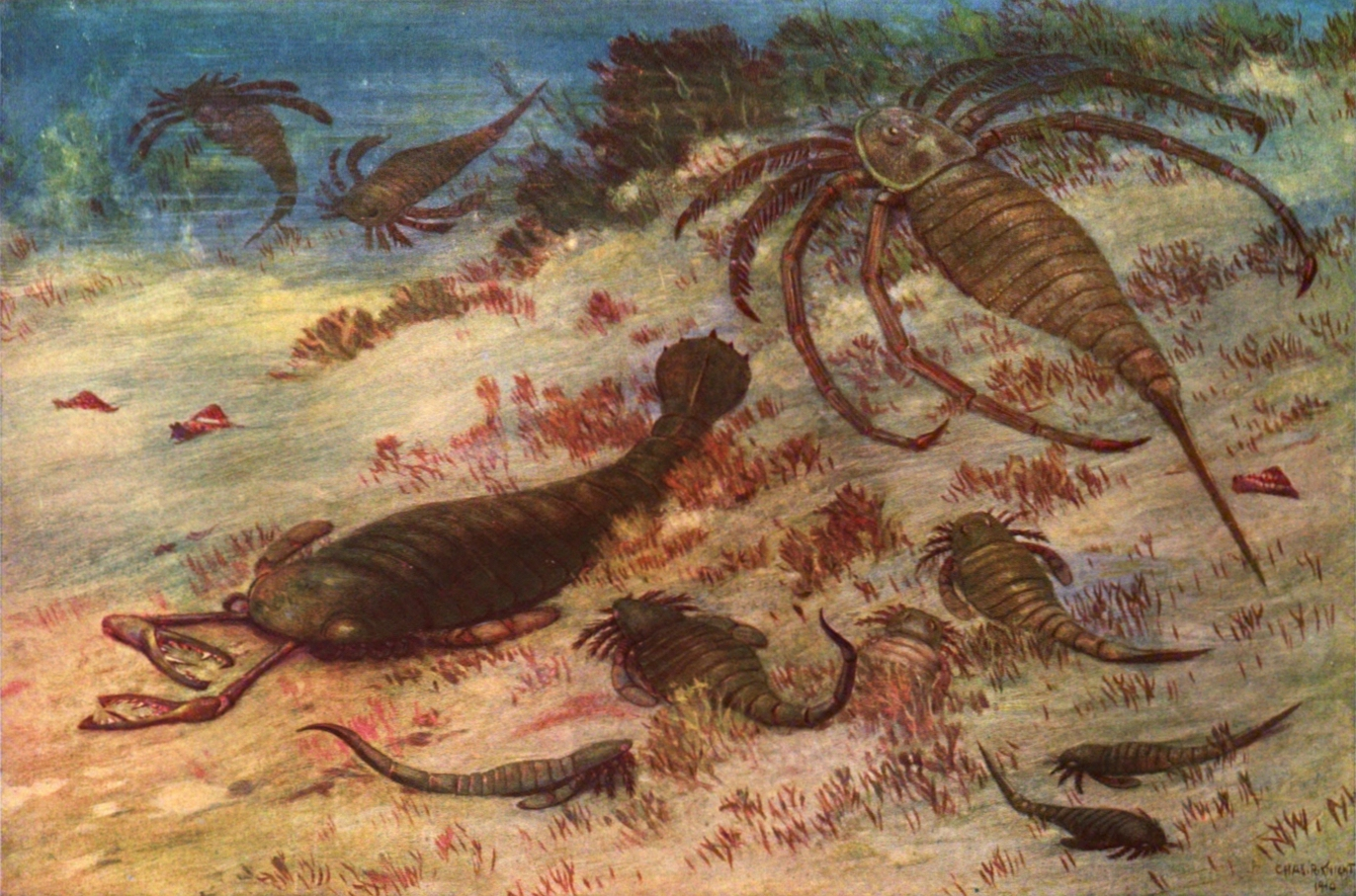
Restoration of various eurypterids discovered in New York, including Dolichopterus, Eusarcana, Stylonurus, Eurypterus and Hughmilleria. Pterygotus can be seen in the center-left.

Traditionally interpreted as visual and active predators as a group, recent studies on the cheliceral morphology and visual acuity of the pterygotid eurypterids have revealed that it is possible to separate them into distinct ecological groups. The primary method for determining visual acuity in arthropods is by determining the number of lenses in their compound eyes and the interommatidial angle (abbreviated as IOA and referring to the angle between the optical axes of the adjacent lenses). The IOA is especially important as it can be used to distinguish different ecological roles in arthropods, being low in active predators.

Despite morphological similarities within the group, the ecology of the pterygotids differed greatly from genus to genus. The vision of Erettopterus was similar to that of the more basal pterygotoid Slimonia and more acute than the more derived Acutiramus, though it was not as acute as the vision of the apex predators Jaekelopterus and Pterygotus or modern actively predatory arthropods. Additionally, the chelicerae of Erettopterus suggest that it was a generalised feeder rather than a highly specialised predator. The claws in Erettopterus are enlarged, as in other pterygotids, though the differentiated denticles and paired distal teeth mean that they were likely not used for specialised feeding, but solely for grasping. Though the number of lenses in its compound eyes is comparable to more derived members of the group, its morphology suggests that it was not as active, nor as specialised as Pterygotus or Jaekelopterus.

The eyes of Acutiramus were low in visual acuity (with few lenses in the compound eyes and high IOA values), inconsistent with the traditionally assumed pterygotid lifestyle of "active and high-level visual predators". The IOA values of Acutiramus changed during ontogeny but in a way opposite to other pterygotids. Vision becomes less acute in larger specimens, whilst vision tends to get more acute in adults in other genera, such as in Jaekelopterus. Pterygotids may thus have been almost equally visually acute early in their life cycle, becoming more differentiated during growth. The chelicerae of Acutiramus likely served as slicing or shearing devices, adding to the evidence that it would have occupied a distinct ecological niche. A significantly less active predator, Acutiramus might have been a scavenger or ambush predator, feeding on soft-bodied animals.

Both Jaekelopterus and Pterygotus have a very high visual acuity, which researchers could determine by observing low IOA values and large numbers of lenses in their compound eyes. The chelicerae of these genera were enlarged, robust and possessed a curved free ramus and denticles of different lengths and sizes, all adaptations that correspond to strong puncturing and grasping abilities in extant scorpions and crustaceans. These genera likely represented active and visual apex predators.

== See also ==
- List of eurypterid genera
- Timeline of eurypterid research
- Hughmilleriidae
- Slimonidae
