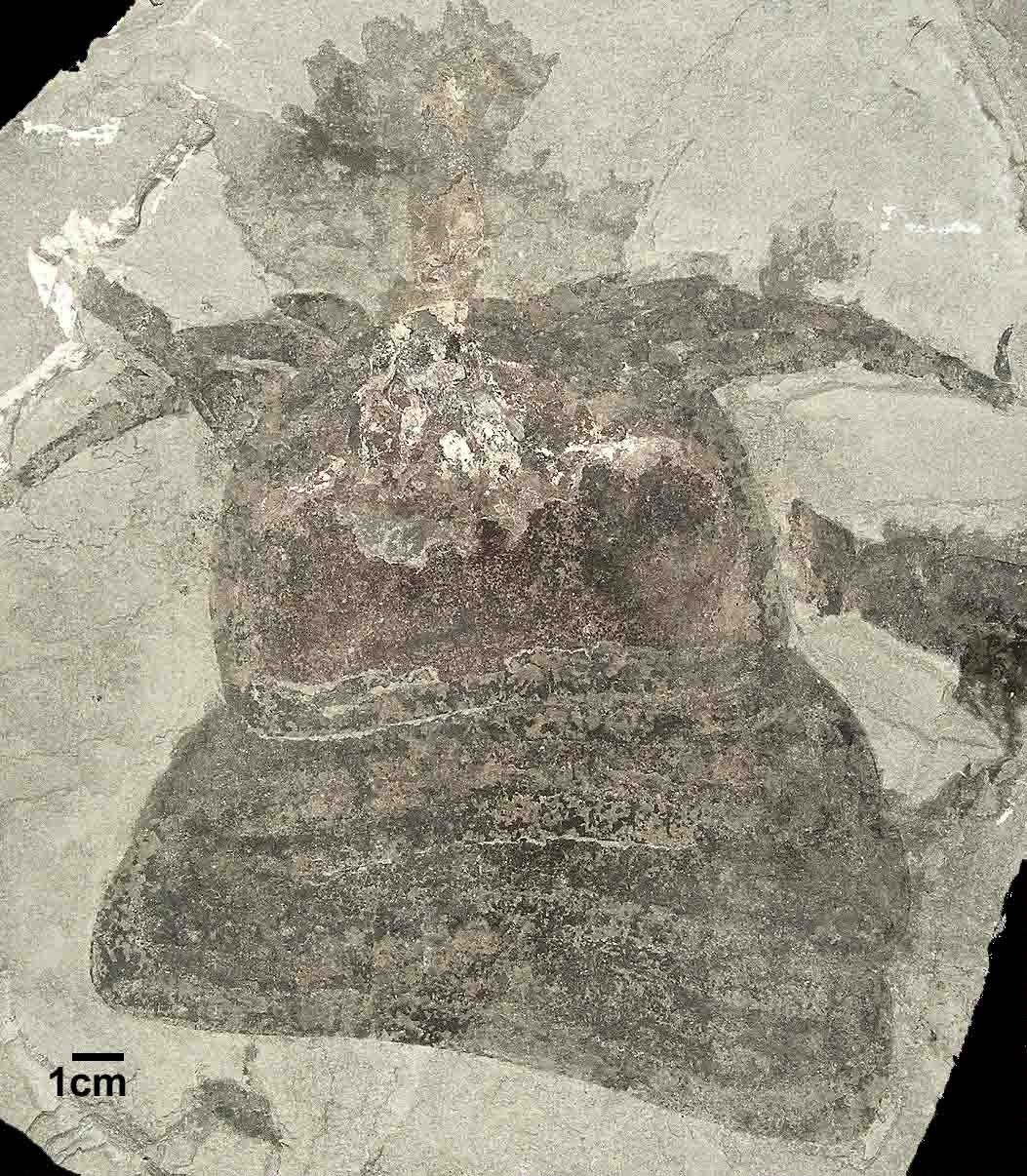
- Fossil specimen of C. ventricosus
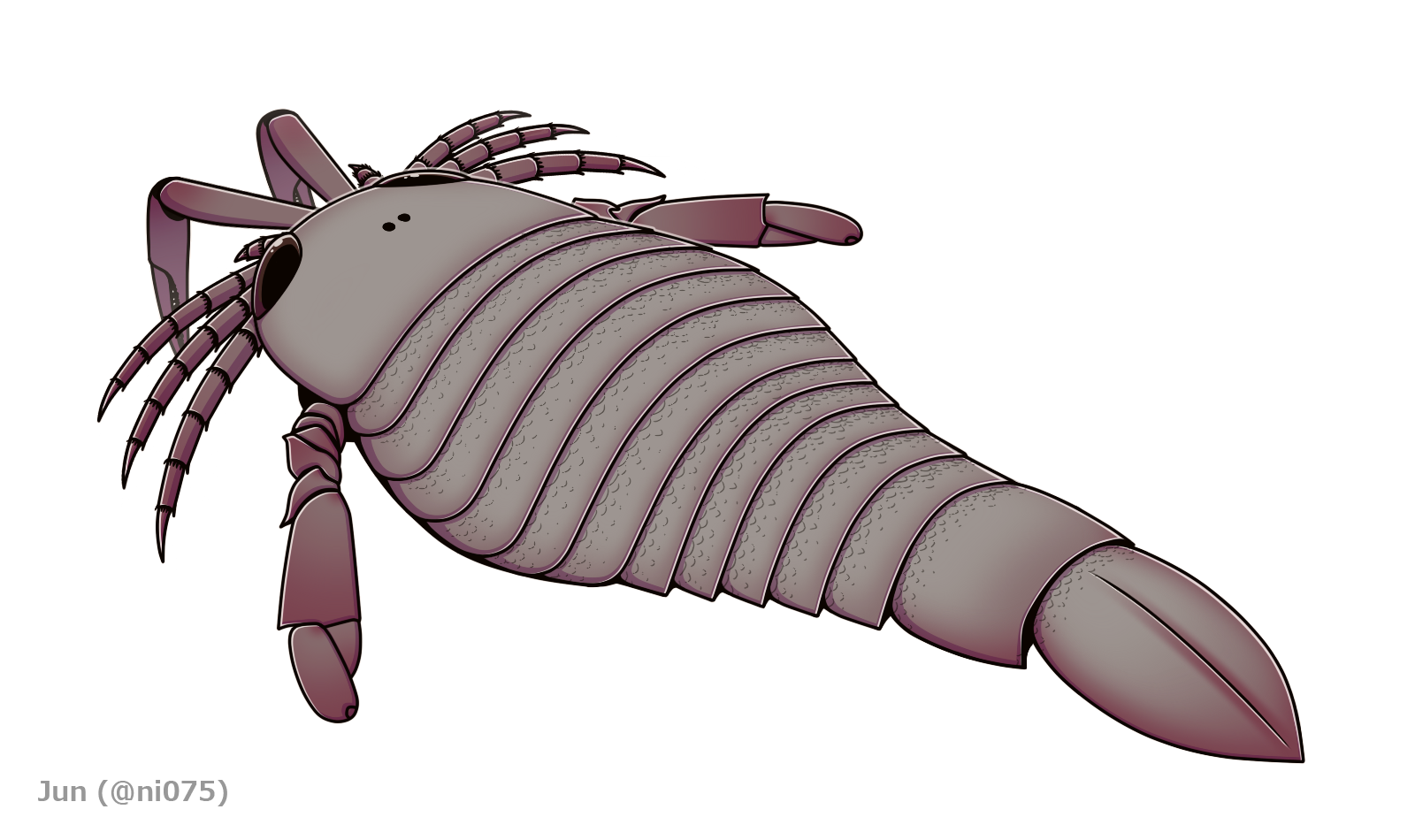
- Restoration of C. ventricosus

Scientific classification
- Kingdom: Animalia
- Phylum: Arthropoda
- Subphylum: Chelicerata
- Order: †Eurypterida
- Superfamily: †Pterygotioidea
- Family: †Ciurcopteridae; Lamsdell, 2025
- Genus: †Ciurcopterus; Tetlie & Briggs, 2009

Type species
- †Ciurcopterus ventricosus (Kjellesvig-Waering, 1948)

Species
- †C. sarlei (Ciurca & Tetlie, 2007); †C. ventricosus (Kjellesvig-Waering, 1948)

= Ciurcopterus =

Ciurcopterus Temporal range: Late Silurian, 423–419 Ma

Extinct genus of arthropods

Ciurcopterus is a genus of eurypterid, an extinct group of aquatic arthropods. Fossils of Ciurcopterus have been discovered in deposits of Late Silurian age in North America. Formerly classified as a basal pterygotid, Ciurcopterus was placed in the separate but closely related family Ciurcopteridae in a 2025. the genus contains two species, C. sarlei from Pittsford, New York and C. ventricosus from Kokomo, Indiana. The genus is named in honor of Samuel J. Ciurca Jr., who has contributed significantly to eurypterid research by discovering a large amount of eurypterid specimens, including the four specimens used to describe Ciurcopterus itself.

As a sister taxon to the pterygotids, Ciurcopterus combined characteristics of the more derived members of that family with features of close relatives of the group, such as Slimonia. Measuring 70 centimetres (28 inches) in length, Ciurcopterus was relatively large though smaller than many of the pterygotids.

== Description ==
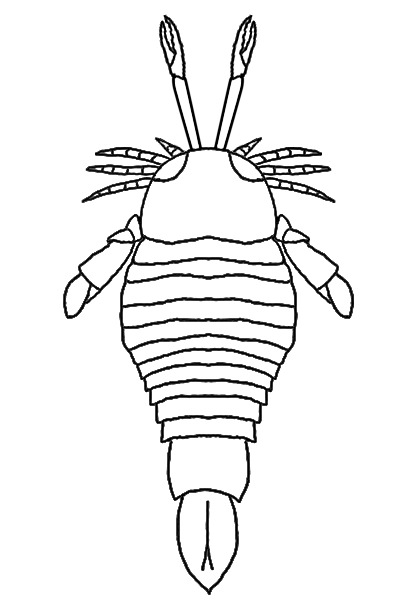
Reconstruction of C. ventricosus. The claws and enlarged chelicerae are speculative and based on more derived pterygotids.

Ciurcopterus was a eurypterid of medium size, with C. ventricosus measuring approximately 70 centimetres (28 in) in length and C. sarlei measuring 50 centimetres (20 in). Though this is large relative to most modern day arthropods, Ciurcopterus was dwarfed by many of the closely related pterygotids, such as Jaekelopterus rhenaniae at 2.5 metres (8 ft, the largest known arthropod) and Acutiramus bohemicus at 2.1 metres (7 ft).

Ciurcopterus possessed walking legs that were similar to those of Slimonia in bearing distal serrations. The telson (the posteriormost segment of its body) was wide and possessed dorsal median carinae. The type A genital appendage (one of the morphs of eurypterid genital appendages, equipped with clasping organs) was undivided and the pretelson (the segment immediately preceding the telson), lacking dorsal median carina (keels running down the center of the dorsal side), is laterally expanded.

Other than the type species C. ventricosus, defined by its quadrate (square-shaped) pretelson and the narrow and elongated telson, one other species has been assigned to the genus; C. sarlei. The telson of C. sarlei is similar to that of C. ventricosus but the pretelson is shorter and wider. Both of these species have in the past been assigned to the pterygotid Pterygotus.

The chelicerae of Ciurcopterus are unknown. It may have possessed elongated chelicerae, similar to those of the pterygotids, but this is speculative. The Ciurcopterus specimen YPM IP 208028 preserves a long narrow structure that projects outwards from beneath the prosomal (head) carapace, approximately the right size and in the right position to be a pterygotid-like chelicera. This structure is not well-preserved enough to make a secure determination. Some authors have speculated that if Ciurcopterus would turn out to have elongated chelicerae, many fragmentary pterygotid specimens and species known only from chelicerae could be reassigned to Ciurcopterus.

== History of research ==
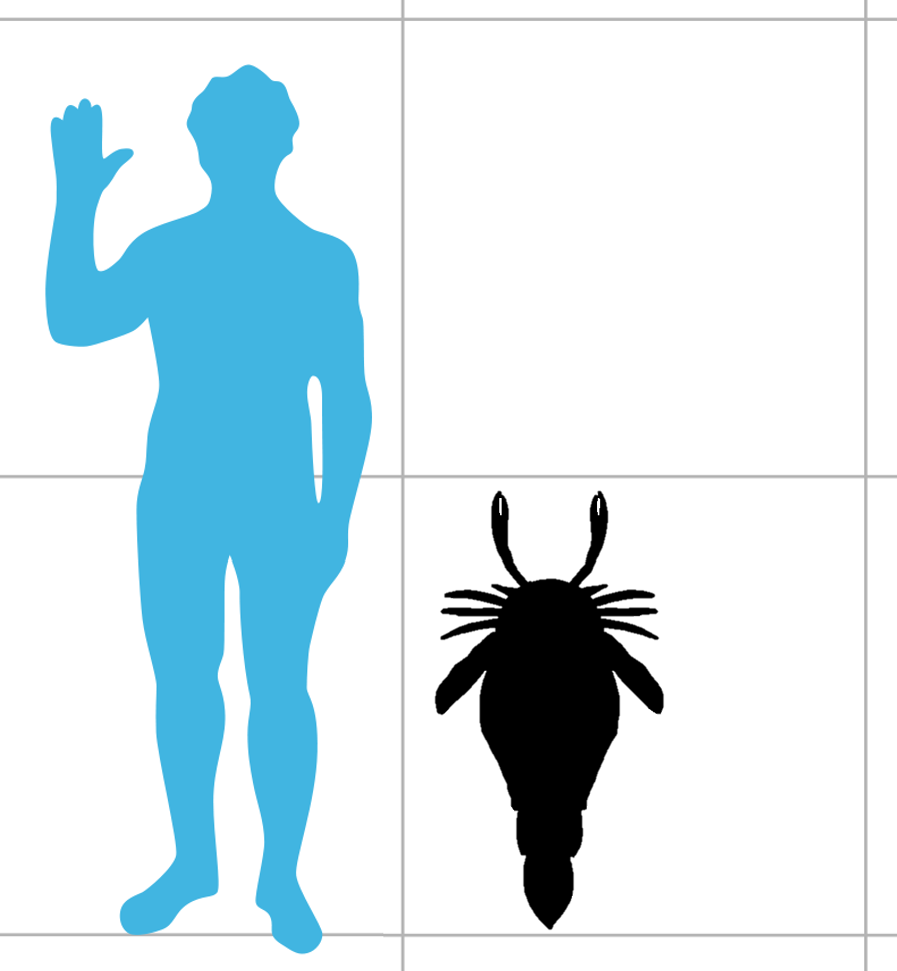
The size of C. ventricosus compared to a 1.8 metre (5.9 ft) tall human

Ciurcopterus was first described as a species of Pterygotus, P. ventricosus, by Erik. N. Kjellesvig-Waering in 1948. This species was represented by the dorsal impression of a single incomplete fossilised individual discovered near Kokomo, Indiana. The specimen (USNM 88130, currently housed at the U.S. National Museum in Washington) preserves most of the body, excluding parts of the appendages and the end of the telson. This individual would have measured approximately 29 cm (11 in) in length in life. Kjellesvig-Waering noted that the species did not resemble any of the other North American species of Pterygotus that had been described but that it did share some similarities with the British P. anglicus, from which it could still be differentiated by the different shape of the carapace, differences in the sixth appendage and P. ventricosus exhibiting a greater gibbosity.

In 2007, O. Erik Tetlie and Derek E. G. Briggs redescribed the species based on four new specimens recovered from Kokomo. The new material allowed them to determine that P. ventricosus represented the most basal pterygotid eurypterid and the study helped provide evidence for the precise phylogenetic position of the family, showing that the Slimonidae (and not the Hughmilleriidae) was the most closely related group to the Pterygotidae. The specimens included YPM 208028 (the anterior half of an individual), YPM 209622 (a telson), YPM 210975 (a genital operculum) and YPM 210974 (a pretelson). Tetlie and Briggs erected a new genus due to the unique features and distinct phylogenetic position of the species, naming it Ciurcopterus in honour of Samuel J. Ciurca Jr., who has contributed significantly to eurypterid research by discovering a large amount of eurypterid specimens, including the four new specimens used to describe Ciurcopterus itself. Another species, C. sarlei (also previously classified as a species of Pterygotus) was also referred to the genus due similarities in the pretelson (which is wider and shorter than that of C. ventricosus) and telson.

In 2025, James Lamsdell placed Ciurcopterus in its own family in the Pterygotioidea, Ciurcopteridae, which was recovered as the sister taxon of the more derived Pterygotidae. The creation of the new family was justified by the armature of the prosomal appendages of Ciurcopterus being different from that seen in the pterygotids, and more similar to the spiny appendages seen in Slimonia.

== Classification ==
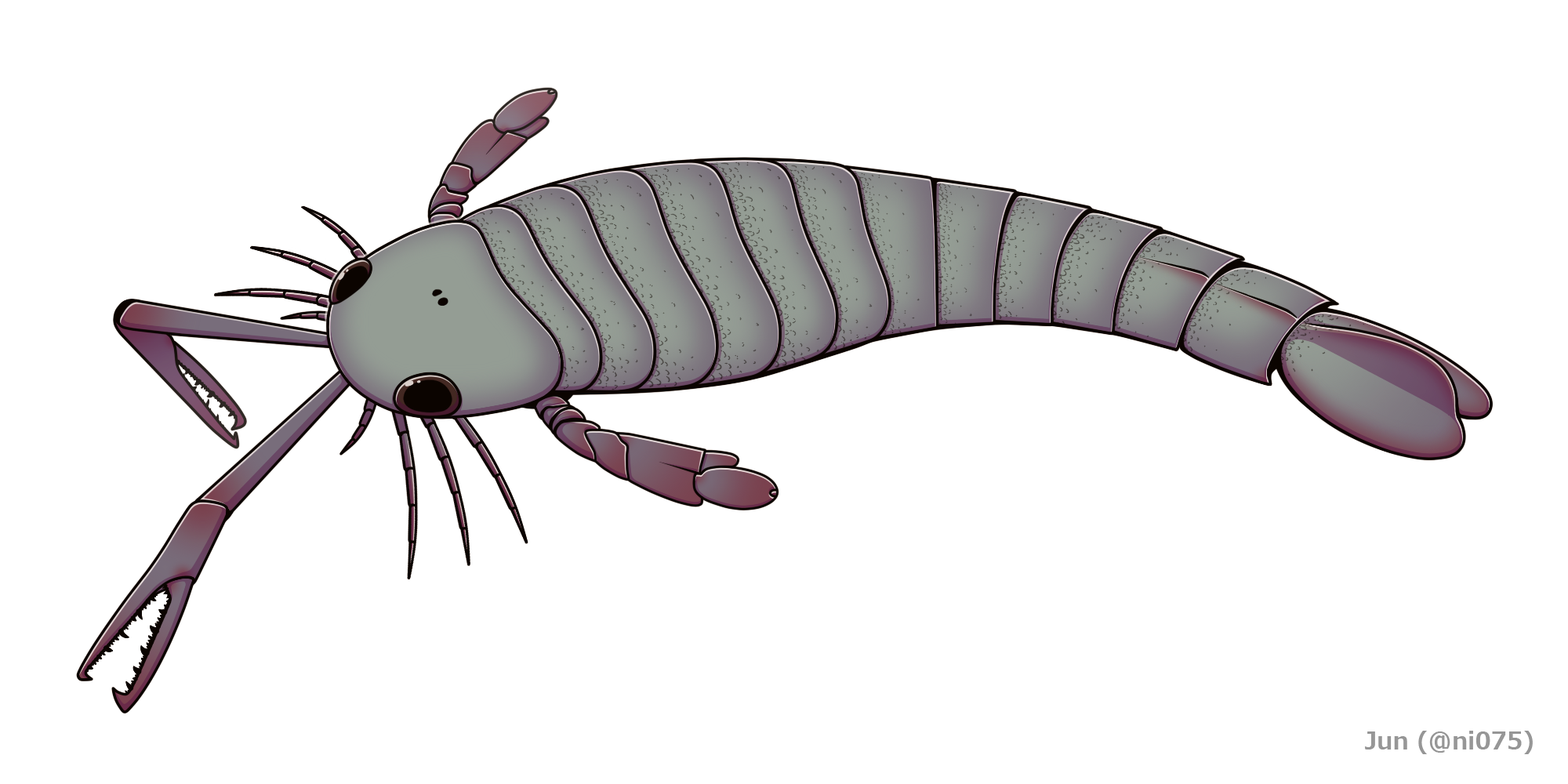
Restoration of Erettopterus bilobus, another basal pterygotid related to Ciurcopterus

Ciurcopterus has been noted as possessing a mix of features from both more primitive pterygotioids such as Slimonia and more derived members of the group firmly within the Pterygotidae. For instance, its appendages share striking similarities with those of Slimonia but its carapace and more importantly its undivided genital appendage (a characteristic of pterygotid eurypterids) makes it similar to the pterygotids. C. ventricosus, also referred to as the "Kokomo pterygotid" after the site of its discovery, does possess some smaller differences compared to the rest of the Pterygotidae, such as keels running down the dorsal side of the pretelson. The combination of features in Ciurcopterus demonstrates that all the diagnostic characteristics of the Pterygotidae did not appear at the same time, suggesting that the evolution of these features was gradual.

The cladogram below is based on the nine best-known pterygotid species and two outgroup taxa (Slimonia acuminata and Hughmilleria socialis). The cladogram also contains the maximum sizes reached by the species in question, which have been suggested to possibly have been an evolutionary trait of the group per Cope's rule ("phyletic gigantism").

- Pterygotioidea
  - Hughmilleria socialis (20 cm)
  - - Slimonia acuminata (100 cm)
    - - - Ciurcopterus ventricosus (70 cm)
        - Pterygotidae
          - - Erettopterus waylandsmithi (60 cm)
            - Erettopterus osiliensis (90 cm)
            - - Erettopterus serricaudatus (60 cm)
              - Erettopterus bilobus (70 cm)
          - - Pterygotus anglicus (160 cm)
            - - Jaekelopterus rhenaniae (250 cm)
              - - Acutiramus macrophthalmus (200 cm)
                - Acutiramus bohemicus (210 cm)

== Paleoecology ==
The Late Silurian Kokomo limestone in Wabash Formation that yielded the known fossils of C. ventricosus has also preserved fossil remains of numerous other eurypterid species and genera, including Barusopterus limuloides, Carcinosoma newlini, Onychopterella kokomoensis and Kokomopterus longicaudatus. Fossils of various other organisms have also been recovered, including a xiphosuran Ciurcalimulus, algal stromatolites, corals (such as Halysites), small cephalopods (such as Protokionoceras) and leperditiid ostracods. Two species of the conodont Spathognathodus (S. eosteinhornensis and S. snajdri) have also been recovered from the formation.

The presence of stromatolites, molds of evaporate crystals and other features suggest that the Kokomo formation was primarily composed of very shallow environments. Geological features of the formation, such as the argillaceous (resembling clay) limestone, suggests that the Silurian environment of the region might have been quiet and lagoonal. The bottom conditions were possibly anoxic and the environment might have been supratidal and hypersaline at large.

Reconstructing the precise ecological role of Ciurcopterus may prove difficult as studies on the paleoecology of other pterygotid eurypterids have mainly focused not only on how visually acute they would have been in life, but also on the morphology of their claws and chelicerae, which are lacking in the known fossil Ciurcopterus specimens. Though derived pterygotids, such as Acutiramus, Jaekelopterus and Pterygotus, had divergent and specialized ecological roles, more basal genera, such as Erettopterus, were more generalized predators.

== See also ==
- List of eurypterid genera
- Timeline of eurypterid research
- Pterygotidae
- Pterygotus
