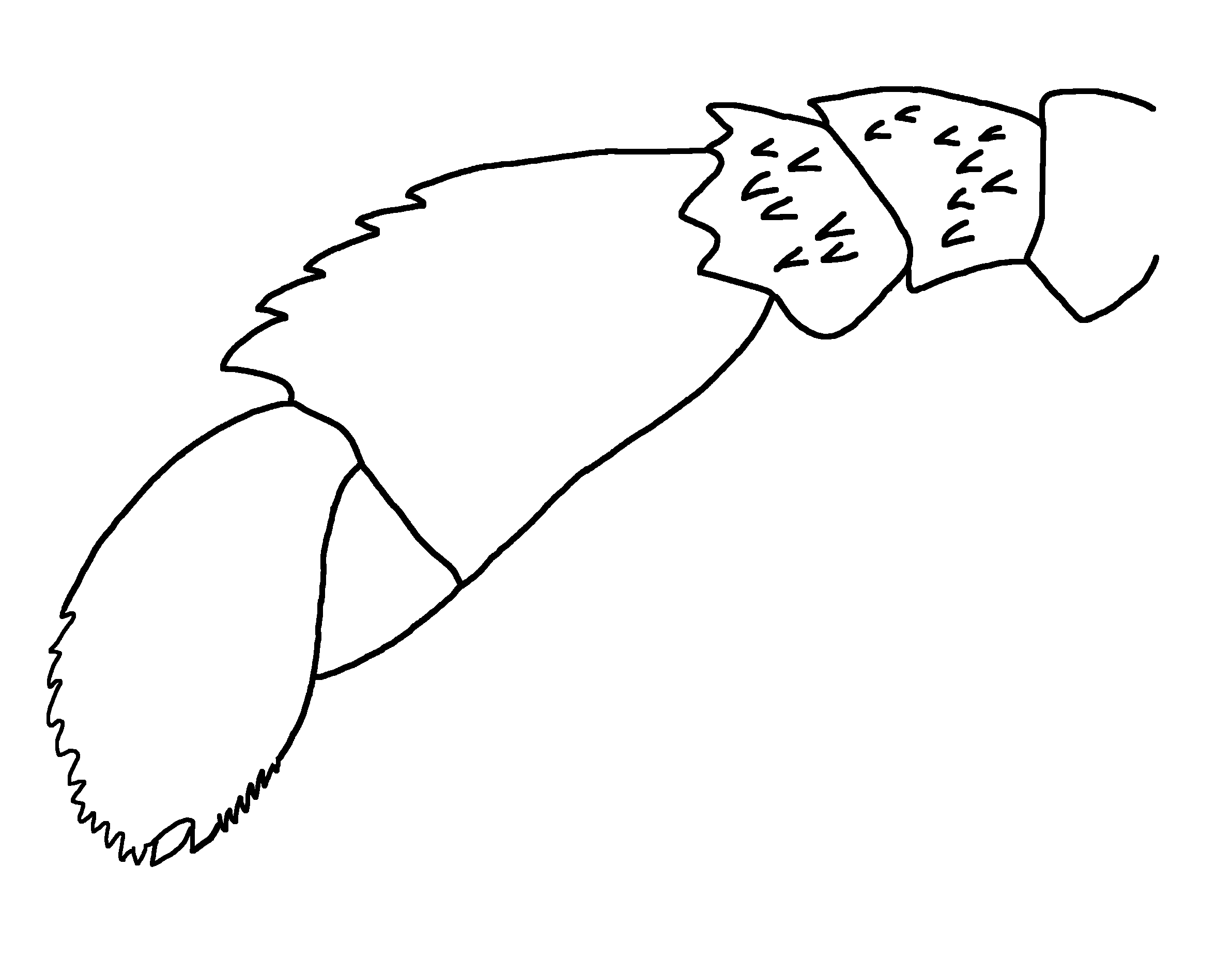
- The defining characteristic of eurypterine eurypterids is the transformation of the sixth pair of legs into swimming paddles. Reconstructed leg of Bassipterus.

Scientific classification
- Kingdom: Animalia
- Phylum: Arthropoda
- Subphylum: Chelicerata
- Clade: Sclerophorata
- Order: †Eurypterida
- Suborder: †Eurypterina; Novozhilov, 1962

Type species
- †Eurypterus remipes De Kay, 1825

Superfamilies
- †Alkenopteroidea; †Dolichopteroidea; †Eurypteroidea; †Moselopteroidea; †Onychopterelloidea; †Diploperculata; †Adelophthalmoidea; †Carcinosomatoidea; †Pterygotioidea; †Waeringopteroidea

Synonyms
- Pterygotina Caster & Kjellesvig-Waering, 1964

= Eurypterina =

Eurypterina Temporal range: Middle Ordovician - Early Permian, 467.3–283.5 Ma

Suborder of eurypterid

Eurypterina is one of two suborders of eurypterids, an extinct group of chelicerate arthropods commonly known as "sea scorpions". Eurypterine eurypterids are sometimes informally known as "swimming eurypterids". They are known from fossil deposits worldwide, though primarily in North America and Europe.

Seventy-five percent of eurypterid species are eurypterines; this represents 99% of specimens. The superfamily Pterygotioidea is the most species-rich clade, with 56 species, followed by the Adelophthalmoidea with 43 species; as sister taxa, they comprise the most derived eurypterines. Pterygotioidea includes the pterygotids, which are the only eurypterids known to have a cosmopolitan distribution.

Though more numerous both in specimens and taxa, the eurypterines have the shorter temporal range of the two eurypterid suborders. They first appeared around the same time as the Stylonurina in the Middle Ordovician. The suborder faced a slow extinction during the Middle and Late Devonian, possibly tied to the emergence of jawed vertebrates. Every Eurypterine genus and lineage went extinct before the Carboniferous save for Adelophthalmus which would go extinct in the Early Permian, millions of years before the Permian-Triassic extinction event that ended the stylonurines.

== Description ==
The Stylonurina and Eurypterina are most easily distinguished by the morphology of the posteriormost prosomal appendage. In the Stylonurina, this appendage takes the form of a long and slender walking leg, lacking a modified spine (termed podomere 7a). In the Eurypterina, the leg is most usually modified and broadened into a swimming paddle and always includes a podomere 7a.

Swimming eurypterines represent the absolute majority of both known eurypterid species and known specimens, though the morphology of the walking stylonurines is almost as diverse in appearance, and the fossil record of the eurypterines may therefore simply be more complete than that of the stylonurines, possibly due to varying habitat preferences.

== Paleobiogeography ==
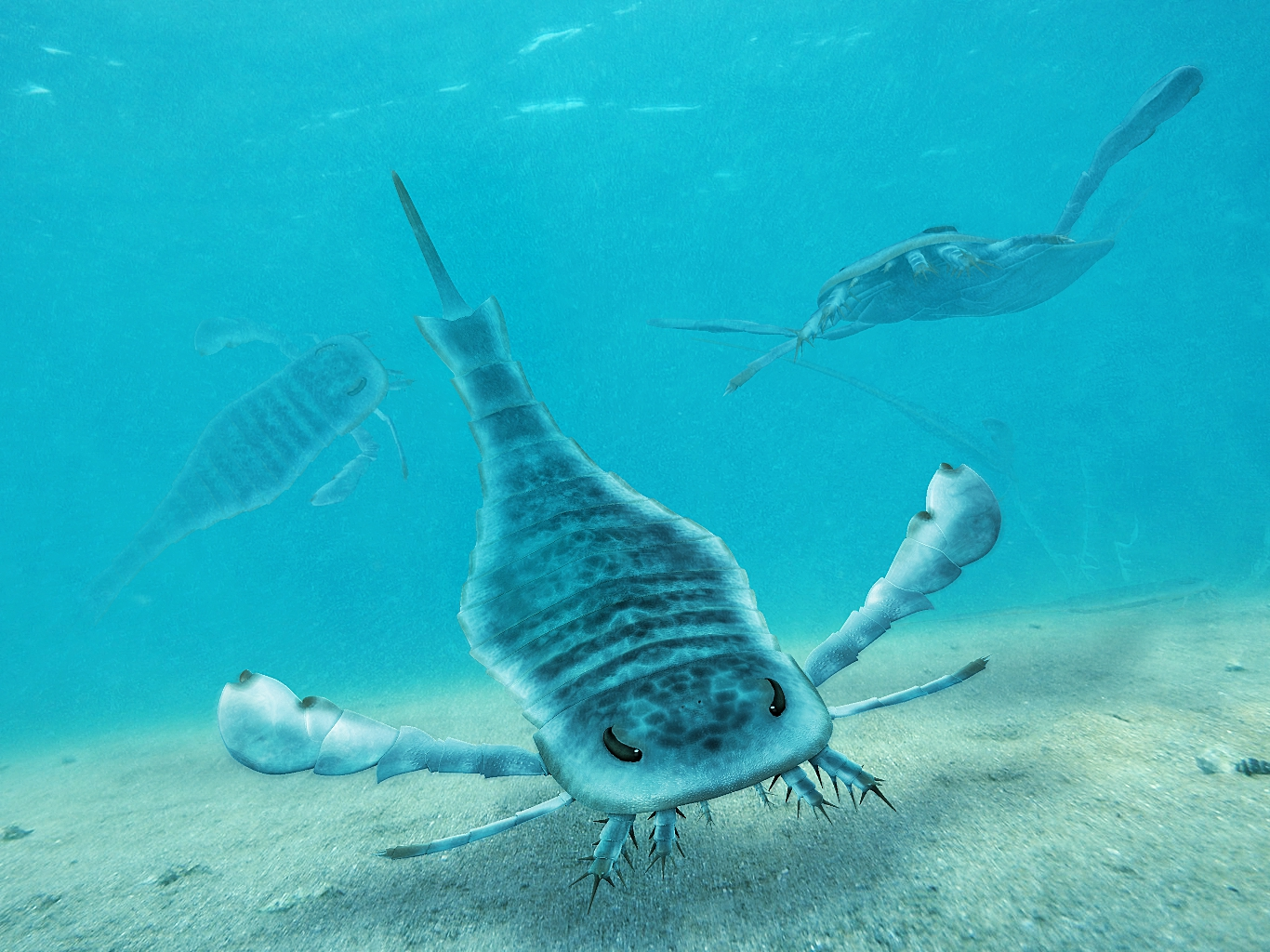
Life restoration of Eurypterus. Eurypterus is by far the most well-studied and well-known eurypterid and its fossil specimens probably represent more than 90 % of all known eurypterid specimens.

The most basal eurypterines with swimming legs, the genus Onychopterella, are known from the east coast of Gondwana close to the equator (a region that today is South Africa) from the Late Ordovician. It is not known whether or not the swimming forms originated here or not, but it is speculated that they migrated from Laurentia, since most stylonurines and basal swimming forms are predominantly known from Laurentia and Gondwana otherwise completely lacks basal swimming forms.

The megalograptoids were likely the first major successful group of eurypterids, evidenced by a Late Ordovician radiation. All known members of the Megalograptoidea are from the Middle to Late Ordovician of Laurentia, though potential records from the Middle Silurian of Baltica are known in the form of the genus Holmipterus suecicus (though its classification as a megalograptoid is questionable).

Eurypteroids are known from Laurentia and Baltica, with one known species from Avalonia. Eurypterus and other eurypteroids appear to have been unable to spread beyond Laurussian waters. The genus Eurypterus in particular dominated many Silurian eurypterid faunas of Laurentia. Despite its abundance, it appears to not have originated in Laurentia, the earliest records of the genus are from Baltica and Eurypterus was thus likely an invasive genus in Laurentia, albeit one that managed to adapt well to the new habitats.

The majority of carcinosomatoid taxa are also known from Laurentia, Baltica and Avalonia. Isolated and fragmentary fossils from the Late Silurian of Vietnam and the Czech Republic show that the terranes of Annamia and Perunica were within the geographical range of the carcinosomatoids. Only a few basal carcinosomatoids (e.g. Carcinosoma and Paracarcinosoma) have been found in deeper waters whilst the more derived forms, such as Mixopterus and Lanarkopterus have not. Basal carcinosomatoids (Carcinosomatidae) are likely responsible for the fossil remains in Vietnam and the Czech Republic and may have had a distribution similar to the cosmopolitan distribution of the pterygotioids, though were not as common nor as successful.

Adelophthalmoids were the longest lasting clade of eurypterines, becoming extinct in the Middle Permian, this is in part due to the survival of Adelophthalmus beyond the Middle Devonian. The earliest records of the genus are from the Early Devonian of western Germany, but following the amalgamation of Pangaea during the Carboniferous and Permian, the genus gained an almost cosmopolitan distribution. The basalmost species in the entire clade are from Baltica and most of the evolution within the basal members took place in Laurussia. By the Devonian, representatives were found in both Siberia and Australia long before the formation of Pangaea.

Although the Pterygotioidea only existed for a period of about 40 million years during a time when most continents were widely separated, the clade is the eurypterid clade with the most cosmopolitan distribution. Like other eurypterines, they are most common in Laurentia, Baltica and Avalonia, but are also found commonly in other paleocontinents. Fossil remains have been recovered from Australia, Libya, Algeria, Morocco, Florida, Saudi Arabia, Iberia, South America, vast swaths of Gondwana, Bohemia and Siberia. The earliest pterygotioids are from the latest Llandovery of Scotland, Laurentia and South China and this mobility makes it difficult to pinpoint the geographical origin of the clade, though it is speculated to have been close to or in Laurentia like the Adelophthalmoidea.

== Systematics and relationships ==
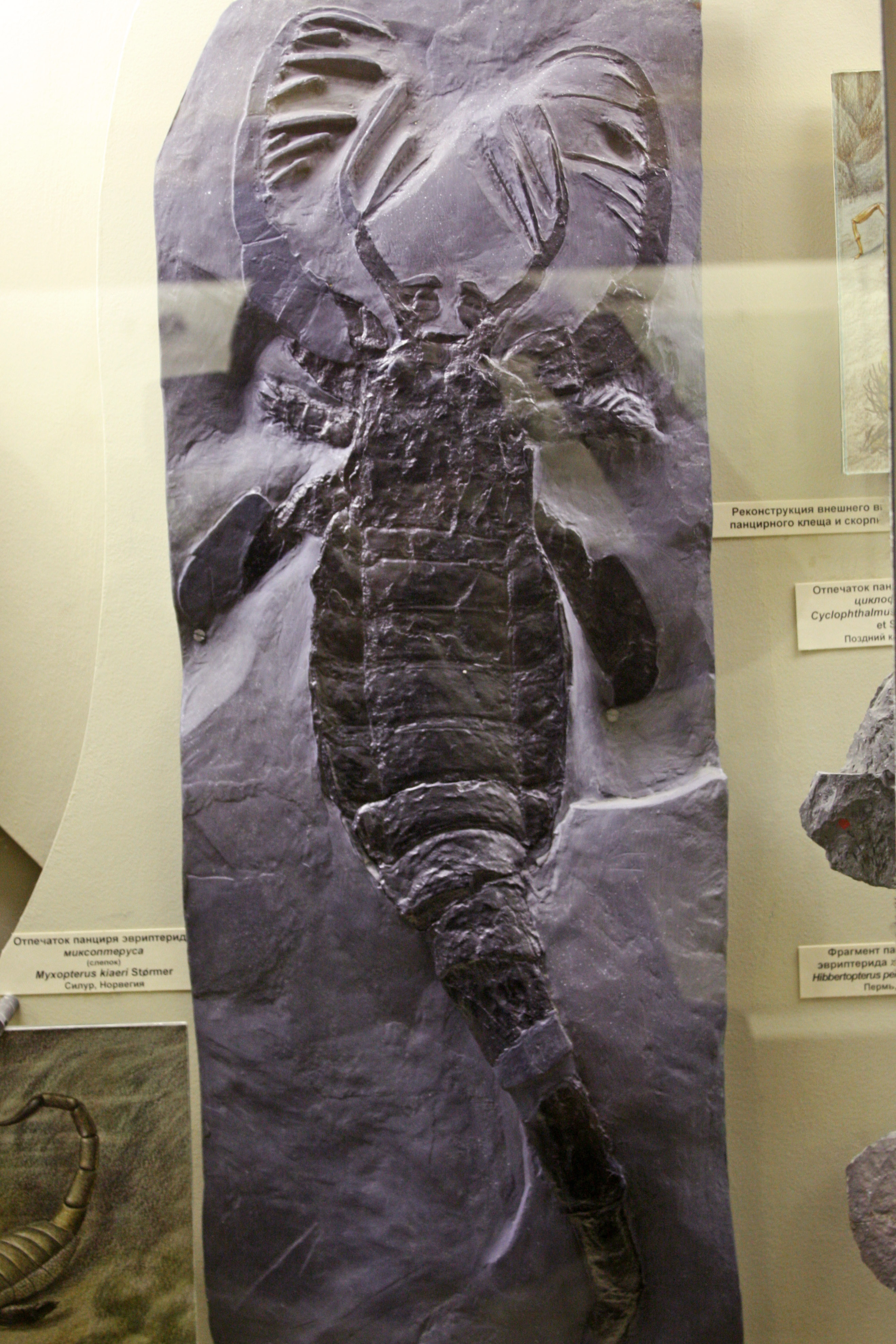
Fossil of Mixopterus, a mixopterid.

Eurypterina contains eight superfamilies - Onychopterelloidea, Moselopteroidea, Megalograptoidea, Eurypteroidea, Carcinosomatoidea, Waeringopteroidea, Adelophthalmoidea and Pterygotioidea. The relationships between them remain somewhat unclear, the Megalograptoidea is thought to be relatively primitive (between Onychopterella and the Eurypteroidea) because they lack a synapomorphy of all more derived swimming forms; the modified distal margin of the sixth podomere of the swimming leg. This position is not necessarily true, since the sixth podomere in the swimming leg resembles the reduced podomere found in the Mixopteridae, and they might instead belong between the Eurypteroidea and Carcinosomatoidea.

In contrast to the Megalograptoidea, the Eurypteroidea is a rather well-known clade that contains around 90% of all known eurypterid specimens. They were closely related, supported by numerous similarities, to the Carcinosomatoidea. The Carcinosomatoidea have a poorly resolved internal phylogeny, though can be easily recognised by scorpion-like appearance and heavily spinose appendages.

Pterygotioidea and Adelophthalmoidea are the two most derived clades as well as the most taxonomically diverse ones. Adelophthalmoidea contains 43 species, whereas Pterygotioidea contains 56. The superfamilies classified as part of Eurypterina contain the following families:

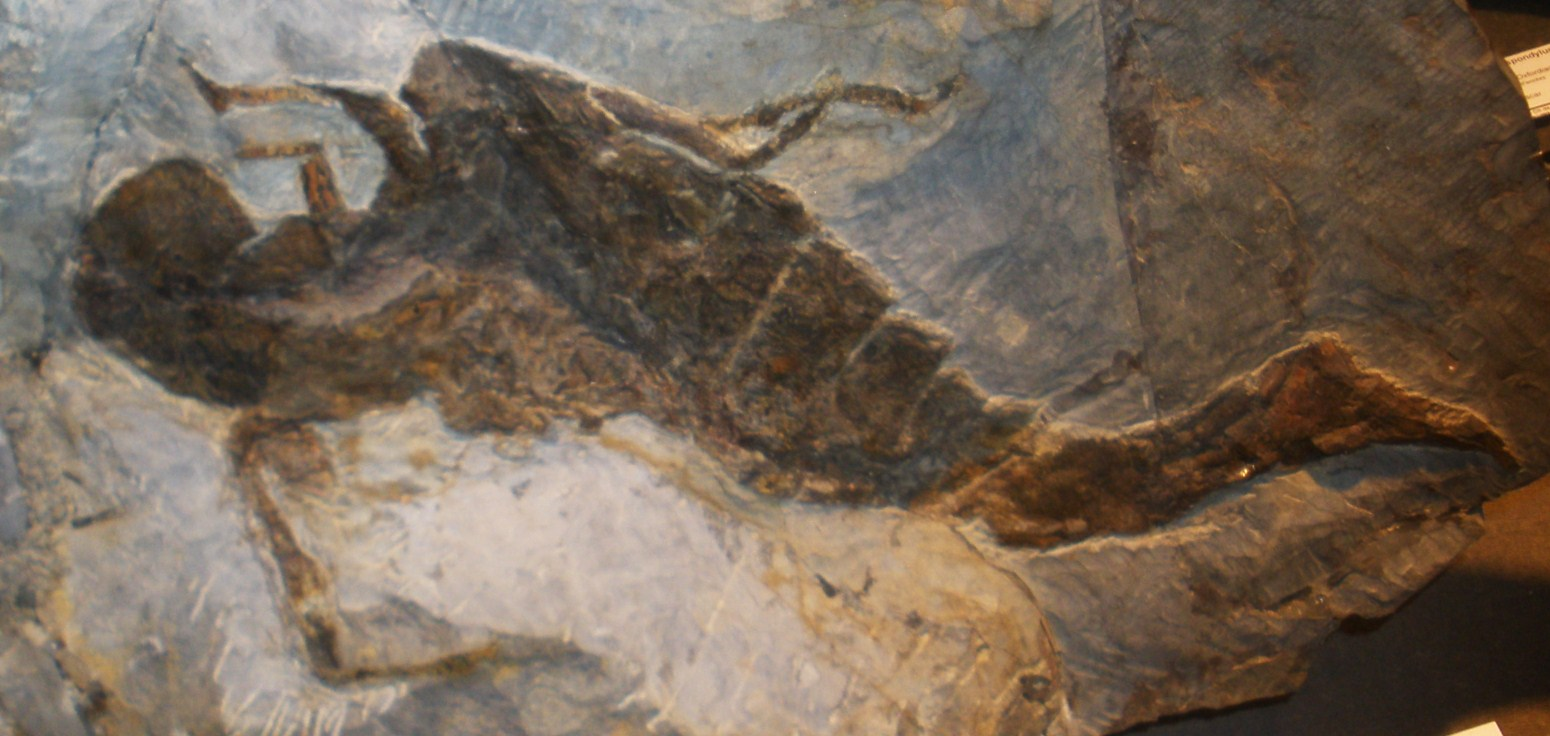
Fossil of Jaekelopterus, a pterygotioid. At a length of 2.5 meters, it is one of the largest arthropods to have ever lived.

Suborder Eurypterina Burmeister, 1843

- Superfamily Alkenopteroidea Poschmann & Tetlie, 2004
  - Family Alkenopteridae Poschmann & Tetlie, 2004
- Superfamily Dolichopteroidea Kjellesvig-Waering & Størmer, 1952
  - Family Dolichopteridae Kjellesvig-Waering & Størmer, 1952
  - Family Erieopteridae Tollerton, 1989
  - Family Strobilopteridae Lamsdell, 2025
- Superfamily Eurypteroidea Burmeister, 1843
  - Family Eurypteridae Burmeister, 1843
- Superfamily Moselopteroidea Lamsdell, Braddy, & Tetlie, 2010
  - Family Moselopteridae Lamsdell, Braddy, & Tetlie, 2010
- Superfamily Onychopterelloidea Lamsdell, 2011
  - Family Onychopterellidae Lamsdell, 2011
- Infraorder Diploperculata Lamsdell, Hoşgör & Selden, 2013
  - Superfamily Adelophthalmoidea Tollerton, 1989
    - Family Adelophthalmidae Tollerton, 1989
    - Family Nanahughmilleriidae Lamsdell, 2025
    - Family Parahughmilleriidae Lamsdell, 2025
    - Family Pittsfordipteridae Lamsdell, 2025
  - Superfamily Carcinosomatoidea Størmer, 1934
    - Family Carcinosomatidae Størmer, 1934
    - Family Lanarkopteridae Tollerton, 1989
    - Family Megalograptidae Caster & Kjellesvig-Waering, 1955
    - Family Mixopteridae Caster & Kjellesvig-Waering, 1955
  - Superfamily Waeringopteroidea Lamsdell, 2025
    - Family Waeringopteridae Lamsdell, 2025
  - Superfamily Pterygotioidea Clarke & Ruedemann, 1912
    - Family Ciurcopteridae Lamsdell, 2025
    - Family Herefordopteridae Lamsdell, 2025
    - Family Hughmilleriidae Kjellesvig-Waering, 1951
    - Family Hunanopteridae Lamsdell, 2025
    - Family Slimonidae Novojilov, 1962
    - Family Pterygotidae Clarke & Ruedemann, 1912

=== Phylogeny ===
Eurypterines are characterised by the transformation of the posteriormost prosomal appendage into a swimming paddle, one of the main features used to distinguish them from the stylonurines. The cladogram presented below, simplified from a study by Tetlie, showcases the phylogenetic relationships of the Eurypterina based on this adaptation, and the enlargement of the chelicerae, which characterises the family Pterygotidae, to be used for active prey capture.

- Eurypterida
  - - Stylonurina
  - Eurypterina
    - Megalograptoidea
    - - Eurypteroidea
      - - Carcinosomatoidea
        - - Waeringopteroidea
          - - Adelophthalmoidea
            - Pterygotioidea
              - Hughmilleria
              - - Herefordopterus
                - - Slimonia
                  - - Pterygotidae

== See also ==
- Mixopterus
- Eurypterus
- Pterygotus
- Eurypterid
- Stylonurina
- List of eurypterids
