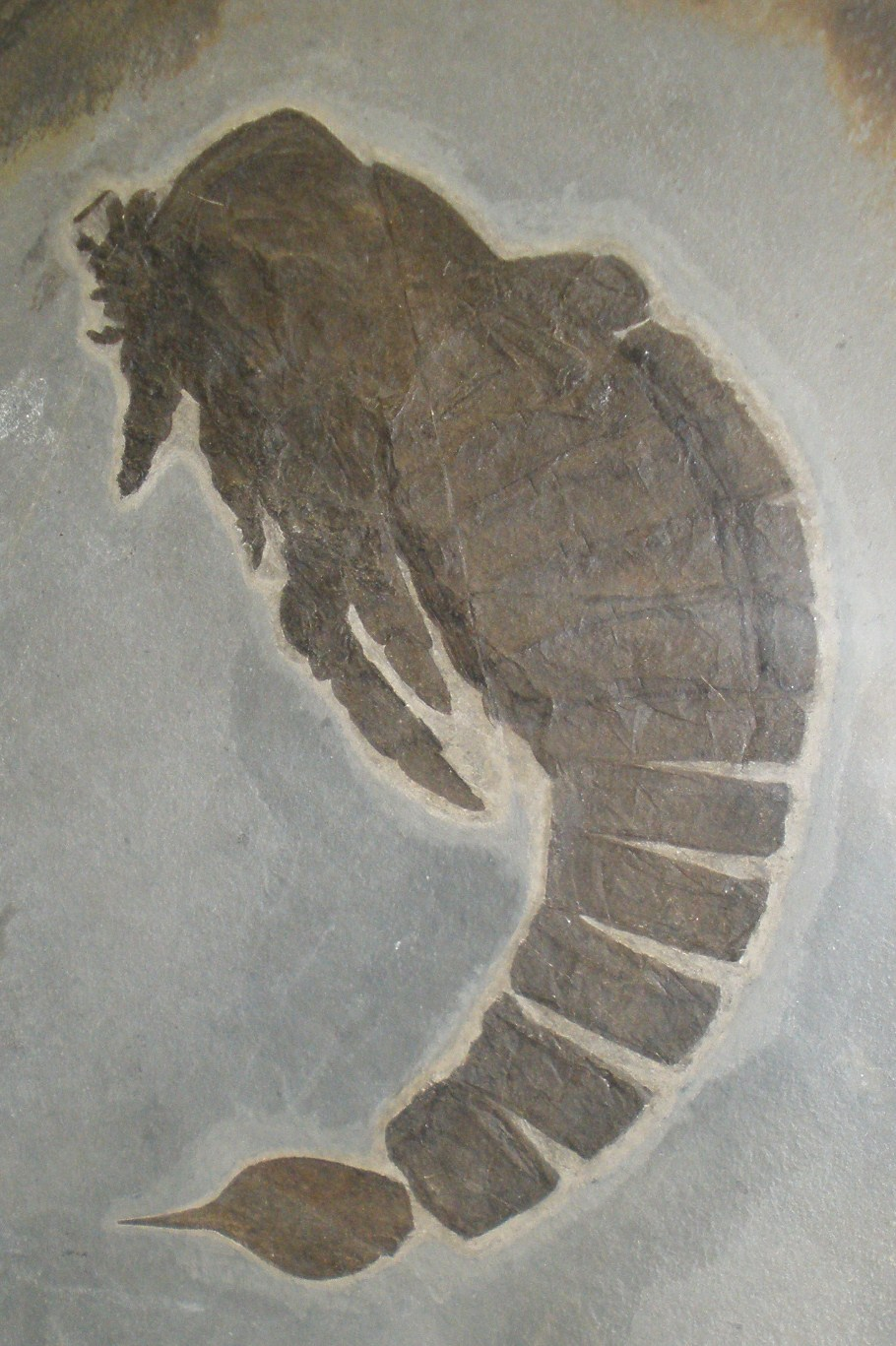
- Fossil of Slimonia acuminata housed at the Senckenberg Museum of Frankfurt

Scientific classification
- Kingdom: Animalia
- Phylum: Arthropoda
- Subphylum: Chelicerata
- Order: †Eurypterida
- Infraorder: †Diploperculata
- Superfamily: †Pterygotioidea; Clarke & Ruedemann, 1912

Type species
- †Pterygotus anglicus Agassiz, 1844

Families
- †Ciurcopteridae; †Herefordopteridae; †Hughmilleriidae; †Hunanopteridae; †Slimonidae; †Pterygotidae

Synonyms
- Slimonioidea Novojilov, 1962; Hughmillerioidea Størmer, 1974

= Pterygotioidea =

Pterygotioidea Temporal range: Early Silurian – Late Devonian, 442–372.2 Ma

Extinct superfamily of eurypterids

Pterygotioidea (the name deriving from the type genus Pterygotus, meaning "winged one") is a superfamily of eurypterids, an extinct group of aquatic arthropods. Pterygotioids were the most derived members of the infraorder Diploperculata and the sister group of the adelophthalmoid eurypterids. The group includes the basal and small hughmilleriids, the larger and specialized slimonids and the famous pterygotids which were equipped with robust and powerful cheliceral claws.

Though the more basal representatives were small, Hunanopterus being the smallest of all pterygotioids at just 6 centimetres (2.4 in) in length, later members of the group, particularly in the Pterygotidae, would become the largest known arthropods to ever exist with several genera surpassing 2 metres (6.6 ft) in length.

Among all currently recognized eurypterid clades, the Pterygotioidea is the most diverse, containing over 50 species in 11 genera. With the number of recognized eurypterid species being around 250, pterygotioids account for more than a fifth of all known eurypterid species. Though the group only existed for around 70 million years and during a time when most continents were separated by large expanses of water (in contrast with previous and later periods of time when there had been supercontinents), the Pterygotioidea had the most cosmopolitan distribution of all eurypterid groups. Their fossils have been recovered from Europe, Africa, North America, South America, Asia and Australia, with the earliest remains being from the Early Silurian of Scotland and South China. The exact geographical origin of the group remains unknown, but is thought to have been in Laurentia.

Though several characteristic and diagnostic traits can be established for each of the families included within the Pterygotioidea, the group as a whole is primarily joined by the shared features of marginal eyes, that their compound eyes are placed near or on the margin of the carapace (the "head" plate).

== Description ==
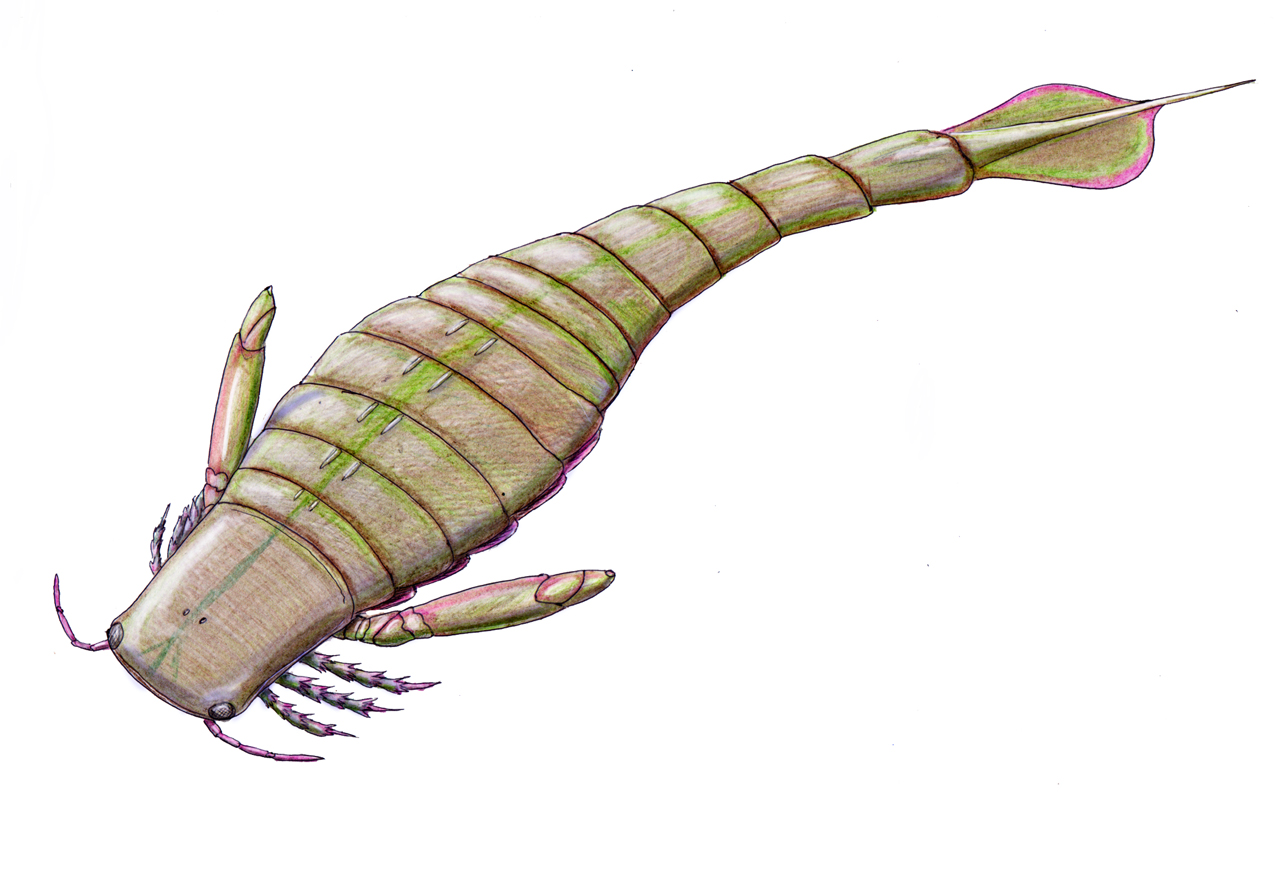
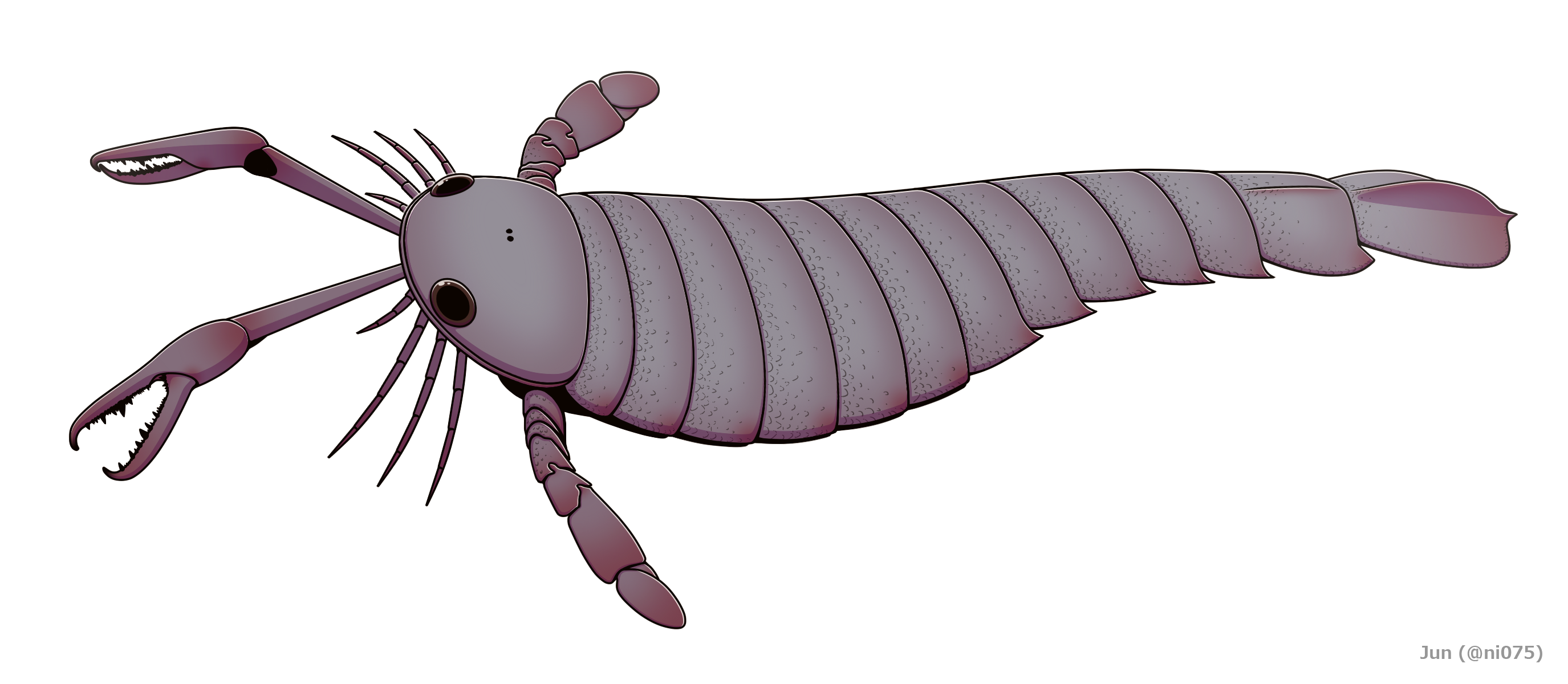
Restorations of slimonid Slimonia (top) and derived pterygotid Pterygotus (bottom).

Pterygotioid eurypterids, whose fossils are recovered in deposits ranging in age from the Early Silurian to the Late Devonian, can be distinguished from all other eurypterine eurypterids by the placement of their eyes, being located near or in some cases on the margin of the carapace (the "head" plate). Pterygotioids ranged in size from small eurypterids, the smallest being Hunanopterus wangi at just 6 centimetres (2.4 in) in length, to the largest arthropods to ever live, the largest being Jaekelopterus rhenaniae which might have reached lengths of 2.6 metres (8.5 ft).

Like all other chelicerates, and other arthropods in general, pterygotioid eurypterids possessed segmented bodies and jointed appendages (limbs) covered in a cuticle composed of proteins and chitin. In the Pterygotidae, the outer surface of the exoskeleton was covered in a scale-like ornamentation but it was smooth within Slimonidae and Hughmilleriidae.

The chelicerate body is divided into two tagmata (sections); the frontal prosoma (head) and posterior opisthosoma (abdomen). The appendages were attached to the prosoma, and were characterized in pterygotids and slimonids by being small and slender and lacking spines. In contrast, the more basal Hughmilleriids did possess spines on their appendages.

In derived members of the group, Slimonidae and Pterygotidae, the telson (the posteriormost segment of the body) was expanded and flattened, often with a spike protruding from its end. The telsons of the Hughmilleriidae were not flattened, instead being lanceolate (in the shape of a lance or spike) and similar to those of more primitive eurypterids such as Eurypterus.

Like other chelicerates, pterygotioids possessed chelicerae. These appendages are the only ones that appear before the mouth and take the form of small pincers used to feed in most eurypterid groups. This function is retained in the more basal Hughmilleriidae and Slimonidae, but pterygotid chelicerae were large and long with strong and well developed teeth on specialized chelae (claws).

== History of research ==
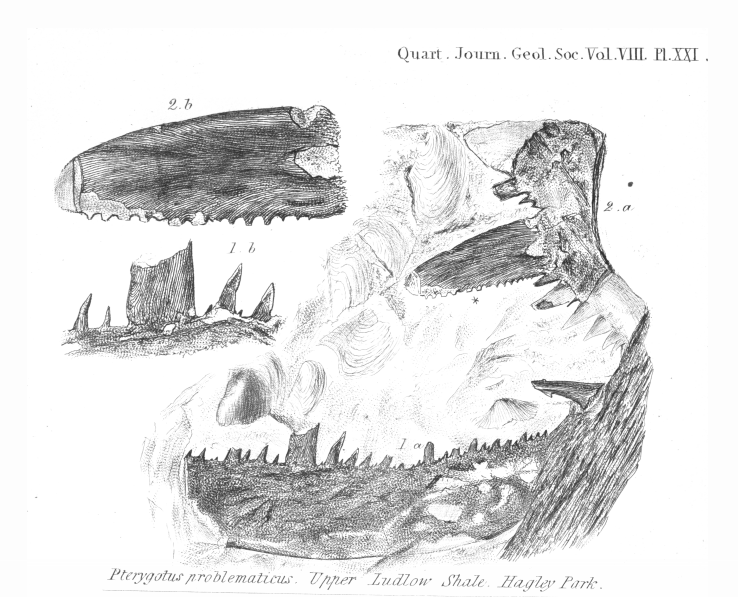
Fossils described by John William Salter as belonging to "Pterygotus problematicus" in 1852. This species is now considered a nomen vanum.

The first pterygotioid fossils to be uncovered were those of the type genus, Pterygotus. Louis Agassiz, a Swiss-American biologist and geologist, described the fossils in 1839 and named the genus Pterygotus, meaning "winged one". Agassiz mistakenly believed that the fossils were the remains of a large fish. Agassiz first recognized the true nature of the fossils as arthropod remains five years later in 1844 after having examined more complete fossils recovered in the Old Red Sandstone of Scotland.

In 1856, the species Pterygotus acuminata was named by John William Salter. The fossils referred to this species, recovered from Lesmahagow, Scotland, were soon realized to be distinct from other species of Pterygotus (such as the type species P. anglicus) and that same year geologist David Page erected a new genus to contain the species. The new genus, Slimonia, could be differentiated from other known species of Pterygotus most apparently by the lack of large cheliceral claws, otherwise a defining characteristic of Pterygotus.

In 1903, the genus Hughmilleria was created based on fossils discovered in the Pittsford Shale Member of the Vernon Formation. Its describer, the American geologist Clifton J. Sarle, considered the genus to represent an intermediate form between the more basal Eurypterus and the derived Pterygotus but did not assign Hughmilleria to any particular family.

The family Pterygotidae was erected in 1912 by John Mason Clarke and Rudolf Ruedemann to constitute a group for the genera Pterygotus, Slimonia, Hastimima and Hughmilleria. Pterygotus had also been designated as containing two subgenera; Pterygotus (Curviramus) and Pterygotus (Erettopterus), but Erettopterus would later be raised to its own genus. American paleontologist Erik N. Kjellesvig-Waering emended the Pterygotidae in 1951, referring the genera Hastimima, Hughmilleria and Slimonia, and the newly named Grossopterus, to their own family within the Eurypteracea, Hughmilleriidae, leaving Pterygotus as the sole pterygotid genus.

In 1955, Norwegian paleontologist and geologist Leif Størmer considered the pterygotid clade to represent a family within the eurypterid superfamily "Eurypteracea". In 1962, Russian paleontologist Nestor Ivanovich Novojilov raised the Eurypteracea and Pterygotidae to subordinal and superfamily status, Eurypteracea becoming the suborder Eurypterina and creating the superfamily Pterygotioidea, containing Hughmilleriidae and Pterygotidae. The same year, Novojilov also reclassified Slimonia into a pterygotioid family of its own as it was considered distinct enough from other hughmilleriids to warrant a separate family, the Slimonidae. In 2025, James Lamsdell recognized a total of six pterygotioid families: Ciurcopteridae, Herefordopteridae, Hughmilleriidae, Hunanopteridae, Slimonidae, and Pterygotidae.

== Classification ==
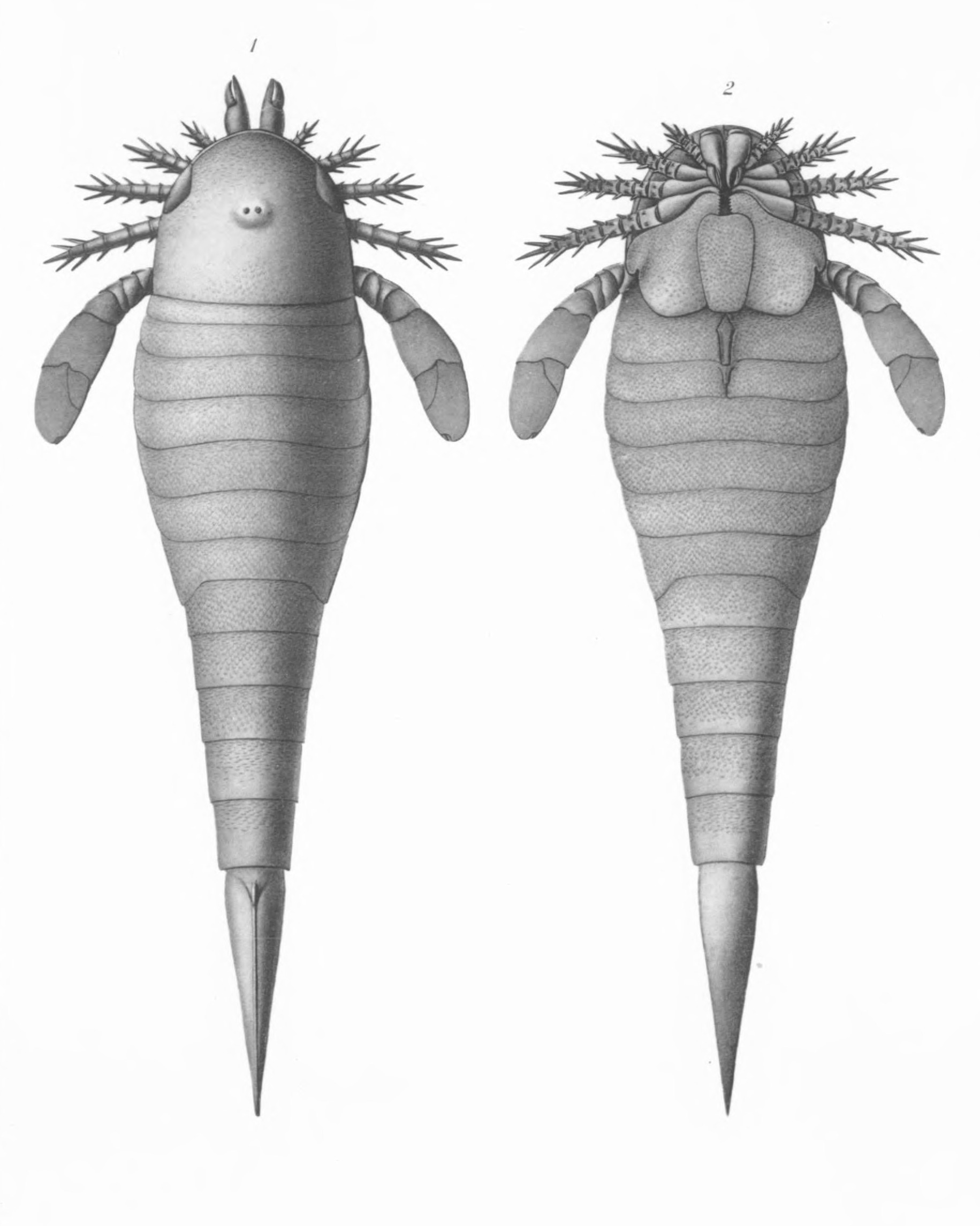
Reconstruction of Hughmilleria socialis. Hughmilleria is a relatively basal pterygotioid.

=== External phylogeny ===
Pterygotioids are classified within the infraorder Diploperculata, in the Eurypterina suborder of eurypterids. The infraorder Diploperculata contains the four most derived superfamilies of eurypterine eurypterids; Carcinosomatoidea, Adelophthalmoidea, Pterygotioidea and the waeringopteroids, united by the shared feature that the genital operculum (the structure that contains the genital appendage) is made up of two fused segments.

Pterygotioidea is the most derived superfamily of the suborder and contains over 50 species (the exact number obscured by dubious species and possible synonyms), which accounts for more than a fifth of the approximately 250 known eurypterid species. The closest sister group of the Pterygotioidea, Adelophthalmoidea, also contains a large amount of species, over 40, and is the second most diverse eurypterid superfamily.

The cladogram below is simplified from 2007 study by O. Erik Tetlie, showcasing the position of the pterygotioids within the suborder Eurypterina. Placement of Diploperculata follows Lamsdell et al. 2013.

- Eurypterida
  - - Stylonurina
  - Eurypterina
    - Megalograptoidea
    - - Eurypteroidea
      - Diploperculata
        - Carcinosomatoidea
        - - Waeringopteroidea
          - - Adelophthalmoidea
            - Pterygotioidea
              - Hughmilleria
              - - Herefordopterus
                - - Slimonia
                  - - Pterygotidae

=== Internal phylogeny ===
Largest sizes of the type genera of three of the pterygotioid families, Pterygotus, Slimonia and Hughmilleria, compared to a human.

Though the Pterygotidae are accepted to clearly represent the most derived group within the pterygotioid superfamily, there has been an ongoing debate on whether the hughmilleriids or the slimonids are the most closely related to the pterygotids, and thus also which of the two families is the most basal. This debate was resolved with the description of Ciurcopterus, described as a primitive pterygotid (though now classified in its own family) that clearly combines features of Slimonia (especially within the appendages) and of more derived pterygotid eurypterids, revealing that Slimonidae was the closest sister-group of the Pterygotidae.

The lack of ornamentation in the telson of Hughmilleria, combined with the fact that the genus shares certain characteristics with basal adelophthalmids (in particular the triangular anterior margin of the carapace), places it as the most basal genus in the superfamily. Hughmilleria also possessed far more gnathobasic (of the gnathobase, an appendage used in feeding) teeth than any other pterygotioid, possessing 18–20 whilst more derived pterygotioids (including related hughmilleriid Herefordopterus) possessed only 12–13.

The cladogram presented below, derived from a 2007 study by researcher O. Erik Tetlie, showcases the interrelationships between the pterygotioid eurypterids. Whilst Slimonidae and Pterygotidae form monophyletic (and thus valid) groups, Hughmilleriidae as then understood (Hughmilleria + Herefordopterus) has been recovered as paraphyletic in a number of phylogenetic analyses and does thus not form an actually valid scientific grouping.

- Pterygotioidea
  - Hughmilleria wangi
  - - Hughmilleria socialis
    - Hughmilleria shawangunk
  - - Herefordopterus banksii
    - - Slimonia acuminata
      - Pterygotidae
        - Ciurcopterus ventricosus
        - - - Pterygotus anglicus
            - - Jaekelopterus rhenaniae
              - - Acutiramus macrophthalmus
                - Acutiramus bohemicus
          - - Erettopterus bilobus
            - - Erettopterus serricaudatus
              - - Erettopterus osiliensis
                - Erettopterus waylandsmithi

The cladogram presented below follows a phylogenetic analysis by Lamsdell (2025), and uses the names for families as established in Lamsdell's monograph:

- Pterygotioidea
  - Hunanopteridae
    Hunanopterus wangi
  - - Hughmilleriidae
      - Hughmilleria shawangunk
      - Hughmilleria socialis
    - - Herefordopteridae
        Herefordopterus banksii
      - - Slimonidae
          - Salteropterus abbreviatus
          - Slimonia acuminata
        - - Ciurcopteridae
            Ciurcopterus ventricosus
          - Pterygotidae
            - - Erettopterus waylandsmithi
              - - Erettopterus osiliensis
                - Erettopterus quijingensis
                - - Erettopterus bilobus
                  - Erettopterus serricaudatus
            - - - Pterygotus ludensis
                - - Pterygotus anglicus
                  - Pterygotus wanggaii
              - - - Jaekelopterus howelli
                  - Jaekelopterus rhenaniae
                - - Acutiramus bohemicus
                  - - Acutiramus macrophthalmus
                    - Acutiramus cummingsi

== Distribution ==
Eurypterids are most commonly recovered from fossil deposits in Scandinavia, Eastern Europe, Britain and North America. During the Silurian and Devonian periods, when pterygotioids were alive, these regions and continents were part of the continents Baltica (Scandinavia and Eastern Europe), Avalonia (Germany, Britain, parts of eastern North America) and Laurentia (most of eastern continental North America). It is around these continents, and the Rheno-Hercynian Terrane (western and central Europe), that pterygotioids are the most common.

Pterygotioid fossils have also been recovered from other parts of the world where fossils of other eurypterid groups are absent, including Australia, Morocco, Libya, Florida, Saudi Arabia, China, Paris, South America, Bohemia and Siberia, which indicates that the group had spread significantly during their 70 million year existence. Pterygotioids appear to have been relatively abundant throughout the Silurian and Devonian world, with unusually (in terms of eurypterids, most groups being absent entirely) large numbers recovered from the ancient continent of Gondwana (composed of Africa, India, South America, Australia and Antarctica).

The earliest known pterygotioids, belonging to the genus Hughmilleria, are from the Llandovery epoch of the Silurian and appear around the same time in Laurentia, Scotland and South China. With the group already being widespread at this seemingly early stage in their evolution, it is difficult to pinpoint their exact geographical point of origin. The closest relatives and sister clade of the pterygotioids, the superfamily Adelophthalmoidea, originated in Laurentia. Modern researchers assume that the case would be the same with the pterygotioids, which are thought to have originated within, or in close proximity to, Laurentia.

It remains unclear whether pterygotioids were capable of crossing oceans on a regular basis or if species recovered outside of Laurentia, Baltica and Avalonia represent isolated occurrences. Pterygotioids were, like the related adelophthalmoids, excellent swimmers which might help explain the intercontinental dispersal patterns and wide-ranging distribution seen in both superfamilies.

== See also ==
- List of eurypterid genera
- Timeline of eurypterid research
