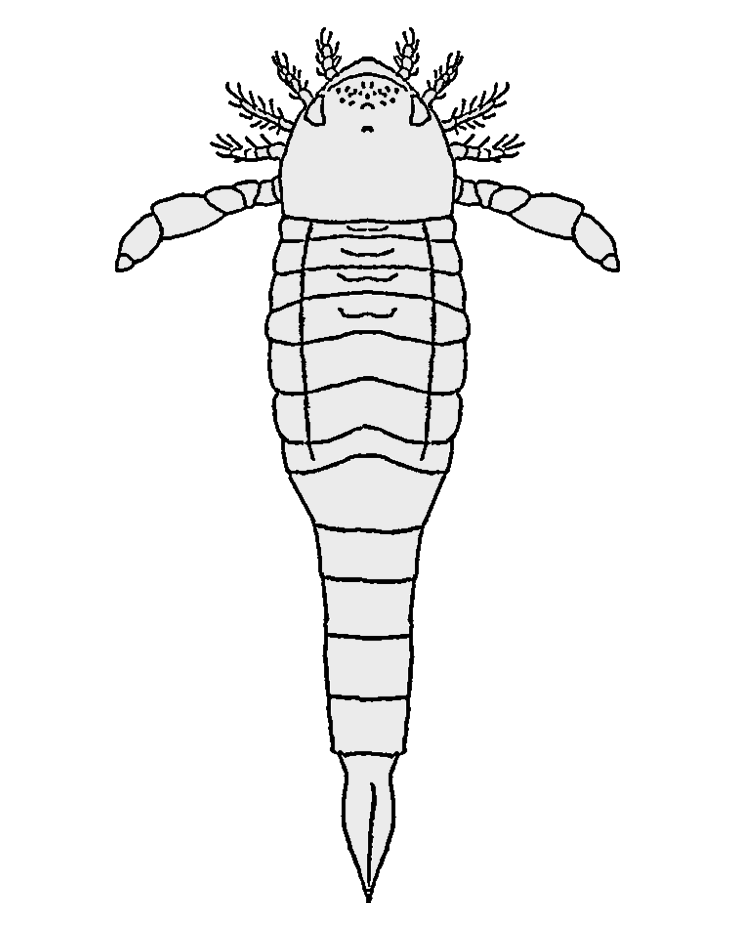
- Orcanopterus

Scientific classification
- Kingdom: Animalia
- Phylum: Arthropoda
- Subphylum: Chelicerata
- Order: †Eurypterida
- Suborder: †Eurypterina
- Infraorder: †Diploperculata
- Superfamily: †Waeringopteroidea; Lamsdell, 2025
- Family: †Waeringopteridae; Lamsdell, 2025

Genera
- †Eysyslopterus; †Grossopterus; †Orcanopterus; †Waeringopterus

Synonyms
- Orcanopteridae Tetlie, 2004 Not formally published

= Waeringopteridae =

Waeringopteridae Temporal range: Late Ordovician - Early Devonian, 449–407 Ma

Extinct family of arthropods

Waeringopteridae is a family of eurypterids, an extinct group of aquatic arthropods. The Waeringopteridae is the only family classified as part of the superfamily Waeringopteroidea, which in turn is classified within the infraorder Diploperculata in the suborder Eurypterina. The earliest known member of the group, Orcanopterus, has been recovered from deposits of Katian (Late Ordovician) age and the latest known surviving member, Grossopterus, has been recovered from deposits of Siegenian (Early Devonian) age. The name Waeringopteridae is derived from the type genus Waeringopterus, which is named in honor of eurypterid researcher Erik N. Kjellesvig-Waering.

Waeringopterid fossils are very rare and the family only contains six known species classified in four different genera (Waeringopterus, Orcanopterus, Eysyslopterus, and Grossopterus). Most of these species are from the ancient continent of Laurentia. It is thus considered likely that the group originated in Laurentia before spreading to Germany during the Devonian. As the fossil record of the group is extremely poor, little is known of the morphology of the taxa within the group.

Although confirmed by phylogenetic analyses as monophyletic, and routinely used within eurypterid taxonomy from 2004 onwards, "Waeringopteroidea" and "Waeringopteridae" were not formally published clades until 2025. Some researchers referred to the group more formally as the "waeringopteroid clade" rather than as the superfamily "Waeringopteroidea", pending a formal publication. The group name was formalised and diagnosed in a 2025 eurypterid monograph by James Lamsdell.

== Description ==
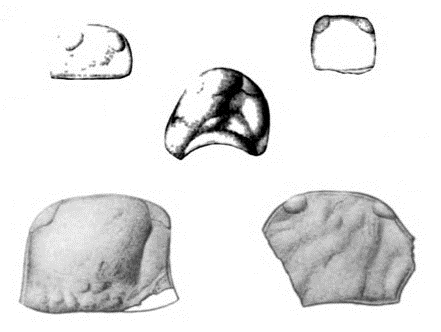
Fossil carapaces of Waeringopterus.

Although waeringopterid fossils remain rare and in most cases fragmentary and very little concrete information on the group can confidently be established due to the poor fossil record, the waeringopterid eurypterids are joined by a handful of known features shared by all genera within the group.

Like all other chelicerates, and other arthropods in general, waeringopterid eurypterids possessed segmented bodies and jointed appendages (limbs) covered in a cuticle composed of proteins and chitin. The chelicerate body is divided into two tagmata (sections); the frontal prosoma (head) and posterior opisthosoma (abdomen). In the waeringopterids, the fifth pair of appendages were spiniferous. The telson (the posteriormost segment of the body) was xiphous (long and pointed). The eyes of waeringopterid eurypterids were located close to the marginal rim of the carapace (the "head" plate).

The waeringopterids were almost all small eurypterids. Eysyslopterus patteni measured merely 8 cm (3.1 in) in length. Waeringopterus cumberlandicus reached 15 cm (5.9 in) in length, while Grossopterus overathi reached 30 cm (12 in). Orcanopterus manitoulinensis reached 60 cm (24 in) in length. Though this is relatively long in comparison to modern arthropods, other members of Diploperculata, such as the pterygotids or the carcinosomatids, reached much larger sizes, surpassing two meters.

== Classification ==
The Waeringopteridae is the only family within the superfamily Waeringopteroidea and contains the genera Eysyslopterus, Grossopterus, Orcanopterus and Waeringopterus. The cladogram below presents the inferred phylogenetic positions of most of the genera included in the three most derived superfamilies of the Eurypterina suborder of eurypterids (Adelophthalmoidea, Pterygotioidea and the waeringopteroids), as inferred by O. Erik Tetlie and Markus Poschmann in 2008, based on the results of a 2008 analysis specifically pertaining to the Adelophthalmoidea and a preceding 2004 analysis. This analysis recovered Eysyslopterus as an adelophthalmoid.

- Diploperculata
  - Waeringopteroidea
    - Orcanopterus
    - - Waeringopterus
      - Grossopterus
  - - Adelophthalmoidea
      - Eysyslopterus
      - - - Bassipterus
          - Pittsfordipterus
        - - Nanahughmilleria
          - - Parahughmilleria
            - Adelophthalmus
    - Pterygotioidea
      - Hughmilleria
      - - Herefordopterus
        - - Slimonia
          - - Erettopterus
            - - Pterygotus
              - - Acutiramus
                - Jaekelopterus

"Waeringopteridae" and the superfamily that includes it, "Waeringopteroidea" (named after eurypterid researcher Erik N. Kjellesvig-Waering), were not formally published clades until 2025. The names originally derived from a 2004 thesis by O. Erik Tetlie and were as such not actually technically valid names until a later paper formalised them. Nevertheless, as phylogenetic analyses confirmed the grouping as monophyletic and the names supply an easy way to refer to the group, they remained routinely used within studies centered around eurypterid taxonomy. In these studies, the names are usually within quotation marks and/or are noted to not be properly valid names that derive from a thesis. The group was also sometimes referred to as the "waeringopteroid clade" rather than as the "Waeringopteroidea" within studies to differentiate it from the properly described superfamilies, before the formal publication of Waeringopteroidea. In addition to Grossopterus, Orcanopterus, and Waeringopterus, Lamsdell also recovered Eysyslopterus as inside Waeringopteridae:

- Waeringopteroidea
  - - Grossopterus
    - Waeringopterus
  - - Orcanopterus
    - Eysyslopterus

== Distribution and paleobiogeography ==
Out of the known waeringopterid species, most are from the fossil deposits in areas that were part of the ancient continent of Laurentia. Only Grossopterus overathi, from the Devonian of Germany, and Eysyslopterus, from the Silurian of Estonia, are known from outside of Laurentia and it is thus assumed that the group originated in Laurentia before they spread to modern-day Germany in the Devonian. Further fossil finds are required to properly study the distribution and evolutionary history of the group. The temporal range of the group extends from the Late Ordovician (Orcanopterus) to the Early Devonian (Grossopterus).

== See also ==
- List of eurypterid genera
