= Indian Point Formation =

Geologic formation in Quebec, Canada

- Stratigraphic range: Ludlow epoch ~423–419 Ma
- Type: Formation
- Underlies: Archibald Settlement Formation

Lithology
- Primary: Sandstone, siltstone, calcarenite
- Other: Biostromal limestone, conglomerate, mafic volcanic rock

Location
- Coordinates: 48.8°N 64.5°W
- Approximate paleocoordinates: 26.6°S 29.7°W
- Region: Quebec
- Country: Canada
- Extent: Gaspe National Park
- Indian Point Formation (Canada) Indian Point Formation (Quebec)

The Indian Point Formation is a geologic formation in Quebec. It preserves fossils dating back to the Ludlow epoch of the Silurian period.

== Description ==
The Indian Point Formation comprises thin- to thick-bedded, locally fossiliferous, calcareous siltstones, fine-grained sandstones, calcarenites, and minor biostromal limestones, conglomerates, red siltstones, and mafic volcanic rocks. The Indian Point Formation is conformably overlain by within-plate tholeiitic mafic to intermediate flows and flow breccias of the Archibald Settlement Formation, developed as a synsedimentary normal fault in the Late Silurian, based on the presence of polymictic conglomerate beds in a thickened Indian Point section east of the fault. Post-Early Devonian (Acadian) orogenic events have produced open to close folds with northeast-trending axes.

== Fossil content ==
The following fossils were reported from the formation:

=== Eurypterids ===
- Waeringopterus sp.

=== Pterobranchia ===
- Monograptus nilssoni

== See also ==
- List of fossiliferous stratigraphic units in Quebec
- Bertie Formation, Silurian Lagerstätte in Ontario
- Charlevoix impact structure, Silurian impact structure in Quebec
