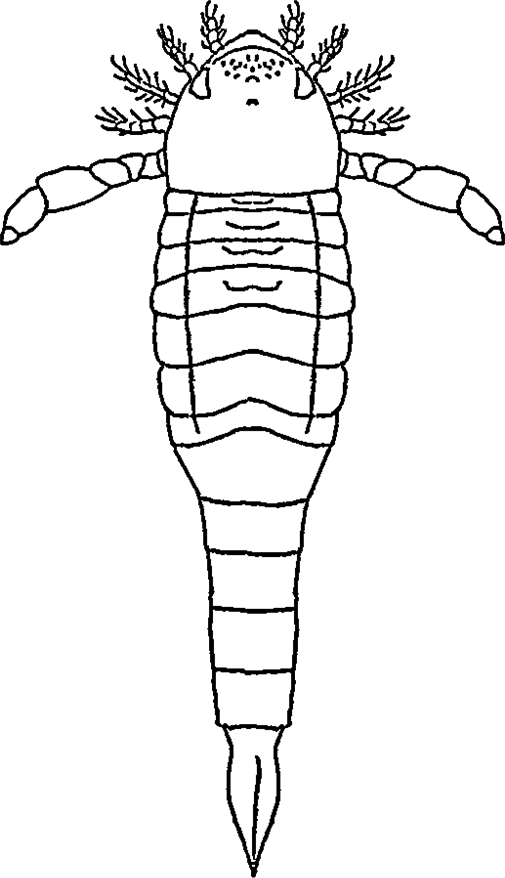
- Reconstruction of O. manitoulinensis

Scientific classification
- Kingdom: Animalia
- Phylum: Arthropoda
- Subphylum: Chelicerata
- Order: †Eurypterida
- Superfamily: †Waeringopteroidea
- Family: †Waeringopteridae
- Genus: †Orcanopterus; Stott et al., 2005

Type species
- †Orcanopterus manitoulinensis Stott et al., 2005

= Orcanopterus =

Orcanopterus Temporal range: Late Ordovician, 449–445.6 Ma

Genus of Eurypterid

Orcanopterus is a genus of a eurypterid classified as part of the family Waeringopteridae. The genus contains one species, O. manitoulinensis, from the Ordovician of Manitoulin, Canada.

== Morphology ==
Size comparison of O. manitoulinensis and a human hand

=== Limbs ===
Orcanopterus is estimated to be up to 60 cm (24 in) long. Like all eurypterids, it had six pairs of limbs, the hindmost of which were broad flat paddles. The first pair of limbs in Orcanopterus are unknown, but were presumably small chelicerae for eating with. The second to fourth pairs of limbs were heavily spined and around 7–8 cm long. The second pair of limbs had four podomeres but is poorly preserved and no spines can be made out. The third pair had four podomeres and three forward-facing spines. The fourth had three podomeres with forward-pointing spines and the fifth pair of limbs had four podomeres, all with spines and with the final podomere a long spine. Its sixth pair of limbs were flat paddles with nine podomeres - the ninth one is unusually large. Three coxae have been identified from the specimen, which have been associated with limbs 4,5 and 6. Coxa 4 has eight small teeth, all thin and about the same size. Coxa 5 is similar, but one of its teeth is much larger than the other seven. Coxa 6 has 22 very small teeth (it is much larger than the other two, hence its association with the largest limb).

=== Carapace ===
Orcanopterus` carapace was formed from the first six segments fused together. The carapace was parabolic in shape with a length:width ratio of around 0.89. At the very front of the carapace there were multiple small folds in the shell following the contours - it is not known what purpose these served.

==== Eyes ====
Its eyes were set on the sides of its carapace and near the front, with smaller ocelli set closer to the top.

=== Body and telson ===
There are twelve body segments, which can be split into two tagmata, and a telson. The first tagma consists of the first seven body segments. All are rounded and much wider than they are long, narrowing gradually until the second tagma is reached. This consists of the last five segments (barring the telson) which are only slightly wider than they are long and have straight sides, with a small doublure around the outer margin. All the body segments are smooth on top, with no ridge or spines, and have broad angular scales on the underside. The telson is long and thin, coming to a point at the end - overall it is leaf-shaped. On the upper side of the telson there was a keel, which probably kept Orcanopterus steady in the water.

==== Genitalia ====
Orcanopterus' genital operculum was located on the underside of the second segment after the carapace. It was made up of two segments and the furca, but appears to be comparatively without ornament. The first pair of sternites after the genital operculum are unfused.
