= Hunanopterus =

Hunanopterus Temporal range: Llandovery–Pridoli

Scientific classification
- Kingdom: Animalia
- Phylum: Arthropoda
- Subphylum: Chelicerata
- Order: †Eurypterida
- Superfamily: †Pterygotioidea
- Family: †Hunanopteridae; Lamsdell, 2025
- Genus: †Hunanopterus; Lamsdell, 2025
- Species: †H. wangi

Binomial name
- †Hunanopterus wangi (Selden and Ren, 2007)

Synonyms
- Hughmilleria wangi Selden and Ren, 2007

Extinct genus of sea scorpions

Hunanopterus is a genus of eurypterid, an extinct group of aquatic arthropods. The genus contains one species, the type species H. wangi from the Silurian of China and Vietnam. Hunanopterus is the basalmost member of the Pterygotioidea superfamily and is classified as the sole member of the family Hunanopteridae.

== History of research ==
H. wangi was described as Hughmilleria wangi in 2007 based on an almost complete specimen (CNU-E-HLT2006001) from Hunan, China. The specific name is in honor of Junqing Wang, who found the fossil of the species in 1992. This species was recovered from the Xiaoxiyu Formation of Hunan, in deposits that suggest that it lived in the Telychian age of the Silurian, which makes it the oldest eurypterid discovered in China. Articulated specimens are also described from Huixingshao Formation, alongside fish fossils like Xiushanosteus and Shenacanthus. H. wangi differed from the known species of Hughmilleria in the presence of epimera (lateral "extensions" of the segment) on the entire postabdomen and a slightly wider carapace than in the other species. Measuring 6 cm (2 in) in length, H. wangi is the smallest known species of the Pterygotioidea superfamily. In 2025, James Lamsdell erected the new genus Hunanopterus to contain H. wangi, noting its distinct anatomical features and that it was recovered outside Hughmilleria in phylogenetic analyses. Lamsdell placed Hunanopterus in a separate family of its own, Hunanopteridae.

== See also ==
- List of eurypterid genera
