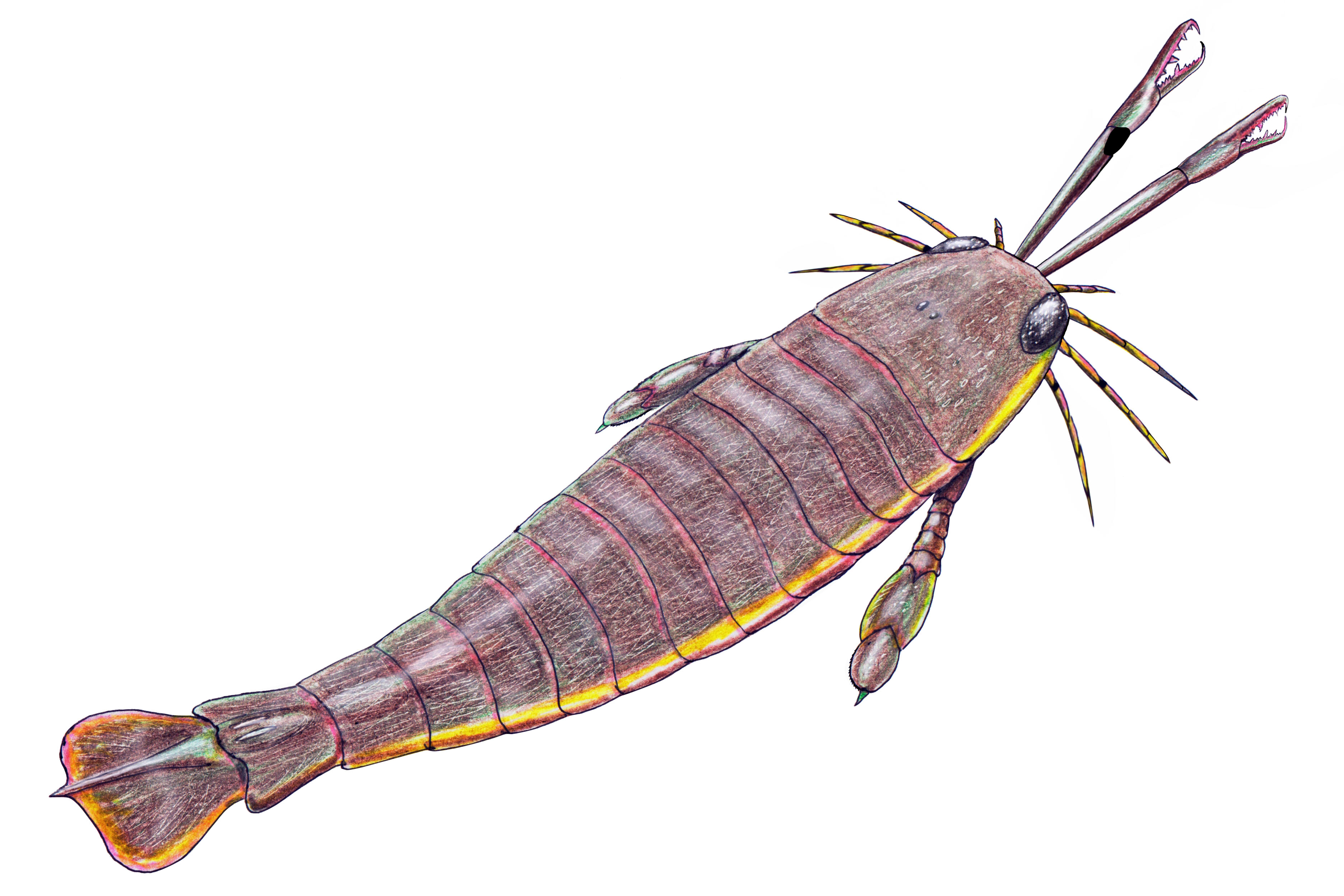
- Reconstruction of Jaekelopterus rhenaniae.

Scientific classification
- Kingdom: Animalia
- Phylum: Arthropoda
- Subphylum: Chelicerata
- Order: †Eurypterida
- Suborder: †Eurypterina
- Infraorder: †Diploperculata; Lamsdell, Hoşgör & Selden, 2013

Superfamilies
- †Adelophthalmoidea; †Carcinosomatoidea; †Pterygotioidea; †Waeringopteroidea

= Diploperculata =

Diploperculata Temporal range: Middle Ordovician - Early Permian, 467.3–283.5 Ma

Infraorder of arthropods

Diploperculata is an infraorder of eurypterids, an extinct group of aquatic arthropods commonly known as "sea scorpions". The name, derived from Greek διπλόω ("double") and operculum, refers to the distinguishing feature that unites the superfamilies included in the group, that the genital operculum is made up of two fused segments.

The group contains the three eurypterine superfamilies Carcinosomatoidea, Adelophthalmoidea and Pterygotioidea alongside the as of yet undescribed "waeringopteroid" clade. The diploperculate eurypterine clade had prior to its description been noted as a monophyletic group of derived eurypterines that form a sister-taxon to the superfamily Eurypteroidea.

== See also ==
- List of eurypterid genera
