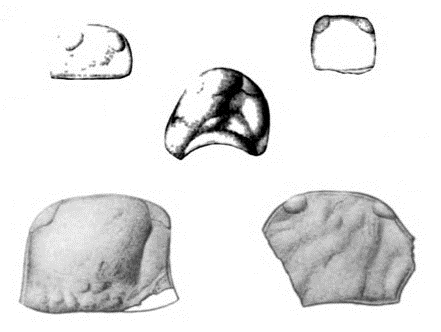
- Fossil carapaces referred to Waeringopterus

Scientific classification
- Kingdom: Animalia
- Phylum: Arthropoda
- Subphylum: Chelicerata
- Order: †Eurypterida
- Superfamily: †Waeringopteroidea
- Family: †Waeringopteridae
- Genus: †Waeringopterus; Leutze, 1961

Type species
- †Waeringopterus cumberlandicus Swartz, 1923

Species
- †W. apfeli Leutze, 1961; †W. cumberlandicus Leutze, 1961

= Waeringopterus =

Waeringopterus Temporal range: Late Silurian, 418.7–416 Ma

Extinct genus of arthropods

Waeringopterus is a genus of prehistoric eurypterids from the Silurian of North America. The genus contains two species, W. apfeli from the Syracuse and Vernon Formations of New York and Ontario and W. cumberlandicus from the Wills Creek Formation, West Virginia. Fossils of the genus also were found in the Indian Point Formation of Quebec.
