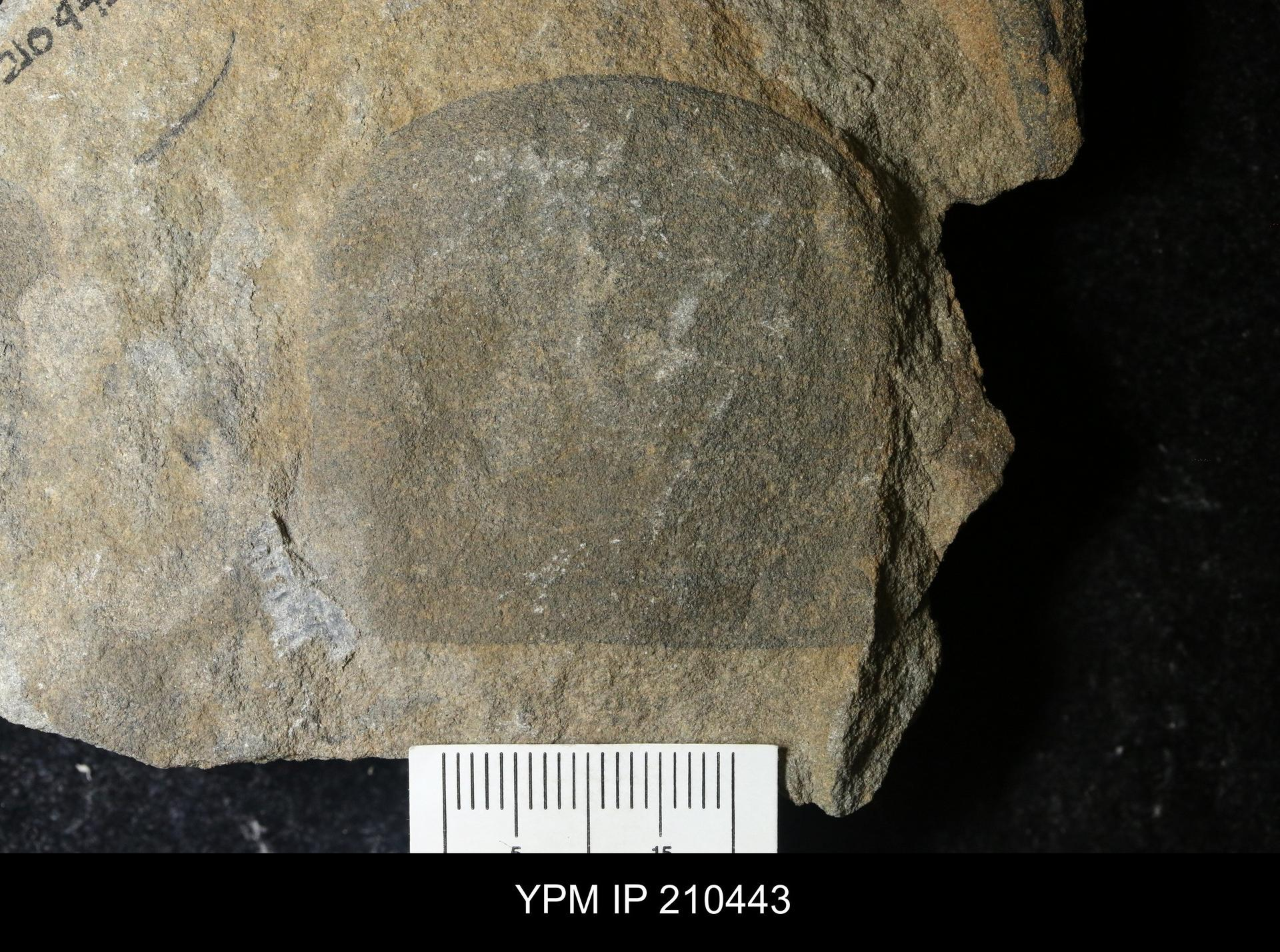
- Fossil carapace of G. inexpectans

Scientific classification
- Kingdom: Animalia
- Phylum: Arthropoda
- Subphylum: Chelicerata
- Order: †Eurypterida
- Superfamily: †Waeringopteroidea
- Family: †Waeringopteridae
- Genus: †Grossopterus; Størmer, 1934

Species
- †G. inexpectans (Ruedemann, 1921); †G. overathi (Gross, 1933, type species)

= Grossopterus =

Grossopterus Temporal range: Early Devonian, 411.2–407 Ma

Extinct genus of sea scorpions

Grossopterus is a genus of prehistoric eurypterid classified as part of the family Waeringopteridae. The genus contains two species, G. inexpectans from Gilboa, United States and G. overathi from Overath, Germany.

== See also ==
- List of eurypterids
