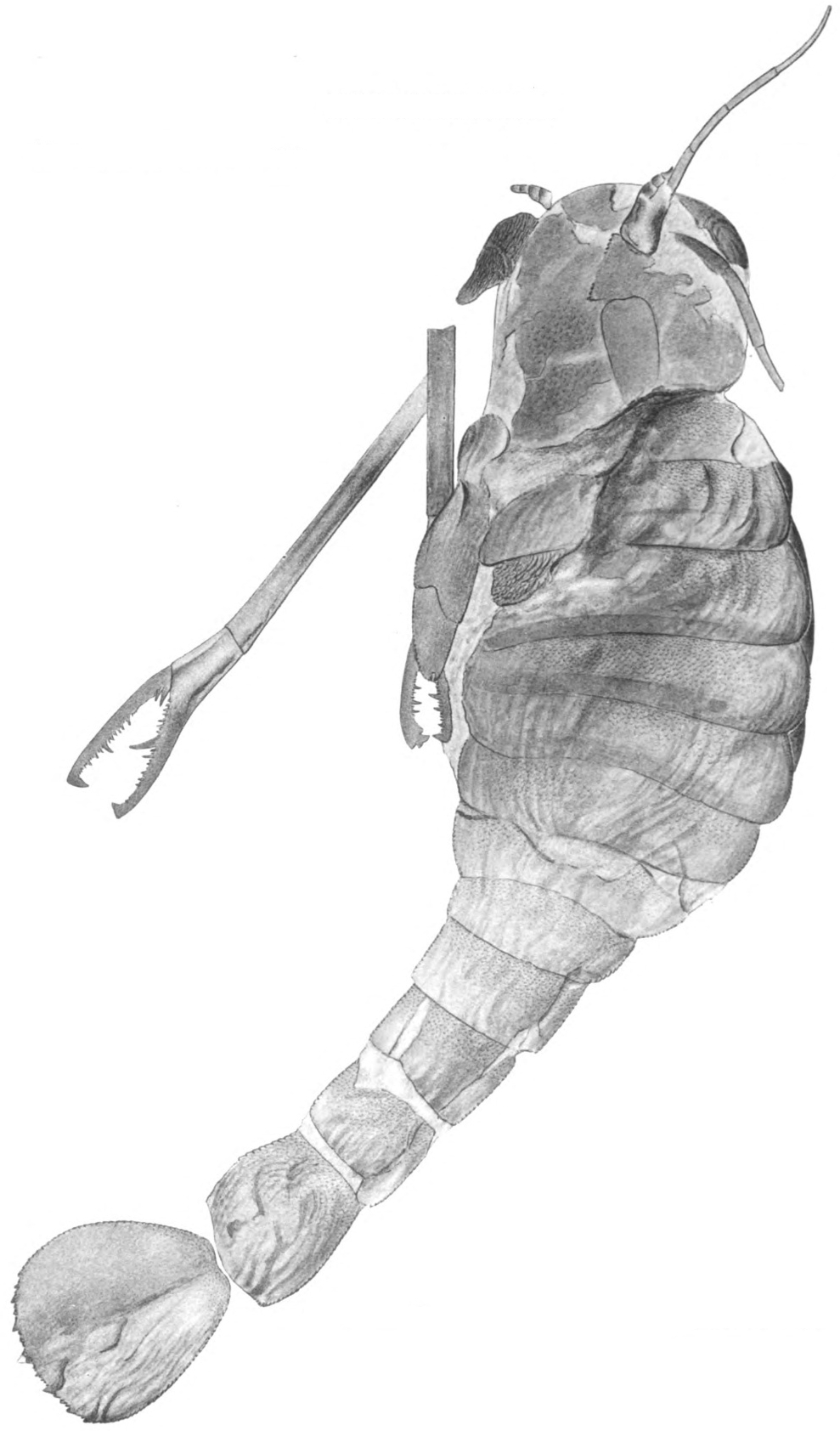
- Fossil of A. cummingsi

Scientific classification
- Kingdom: Animalia
- Phylum: Arthropoda
- Subphylum: Chelicerata
- Order: †Eurypterida
- Superfamily: †Pterygotioidea
- Family: †Pterygotidae
- Genus: †Acutiramus; Ruedemann, 1935

Type species
- †Acutiramus cummingsi Grote & Pitt, 1875

Species
- †A. bohemicus Barrande, 1872; †A. cummingsi Grote & Pitt, 1875; †A. floweri Kjellesvig-Waering & Caster, 1955; †A. macrophthalmus Hall, 1859; †A. perneri Chlupáč, 1994; †A. perryensis Leutze, 1958; †A. suwanneensis Kjellesvig-Waering, 1955

Synonyms
- Synonyms of A. bohemicus: Pterygotus comes Barrande, 1872; Pterygotus mediocris Barrande, 1872; Pterygotus blahai Semper, 1898; Pterygotus fissus Seemann, 1906; Synonyms of A. cummingsi: Pterygotus acuticaudatus Pohlman, 1882; Pterygotus buffaloensis Pohlman, 1881; Pterygotus quadraticaudatus Pohlman, 1882; Synonyms of A. macrophthalmus: Pterygotus osborni Hall, 1859; Pterygotus cobbi var. juvenis Clarke & Ruedemann, 1912

= Acutiramus =

Acutiramus Temporal range: Late Silurian-Pragian, 422–407.6 Ma

Extinct genus of arthropods

Acutiramus is a genus of giant predatory eurypterid, an extinct group of aquatic arthropods. Fossils of Acutiramus have been discovered in deposits of Late Silurian to Early Devonian age. Eight species have been described, five from North America (including A. cummingsi, the type species) and two from the Czech Republic (with one of them potentially found in Australia as well). The generic name derives from Latin acuto ("acute" or "sharp") and Latin ramus ("branch"), referring to the acute angle of the final tooth of the claws relative to the rest of the claw.

Acutiramus is classified as part of the eurypterid family Pterygotidae, a family differentiated from other eurypterids by their flattened telsons (the most posterior segment of the body) and their modified chelicerae (frontal appendages), ending in well-developed chelae (claws). Many pterygotid eurypterids, such as Jaekelopterus and Pterygotus, grew to gigantic proportions. Acutiramus was no exception, with the largest species, A. bohemicus, surpassing 2 metres (6.6 feet) in length. All species were not this large though, with some (such as A. floweri) only reaching lengths of 20 centimetres (7.9 in) and likely an apex predator.

Other giant pterygotid eurypterids, such as Jaekelopterus and Pterygotus, were very visually acute (possessed good and sharp eyesight) in a similar way to modern predatory arthropods and possessed robust and crushing chelae. Studies on the compound eyes and chelicerae of Acutiramus has revealed that it would have had a comparably low visual acuity and claws adapted for slicing and shearing, rather than crushing. This suggests that the ecological role of Acutiramus was distinct from that of other pterygotids, it potentially lived a lifestyle of ambush predation or scavenging on soft-bodied animals, feeding during the night or in otherwise low-light conditions.

== Description ==
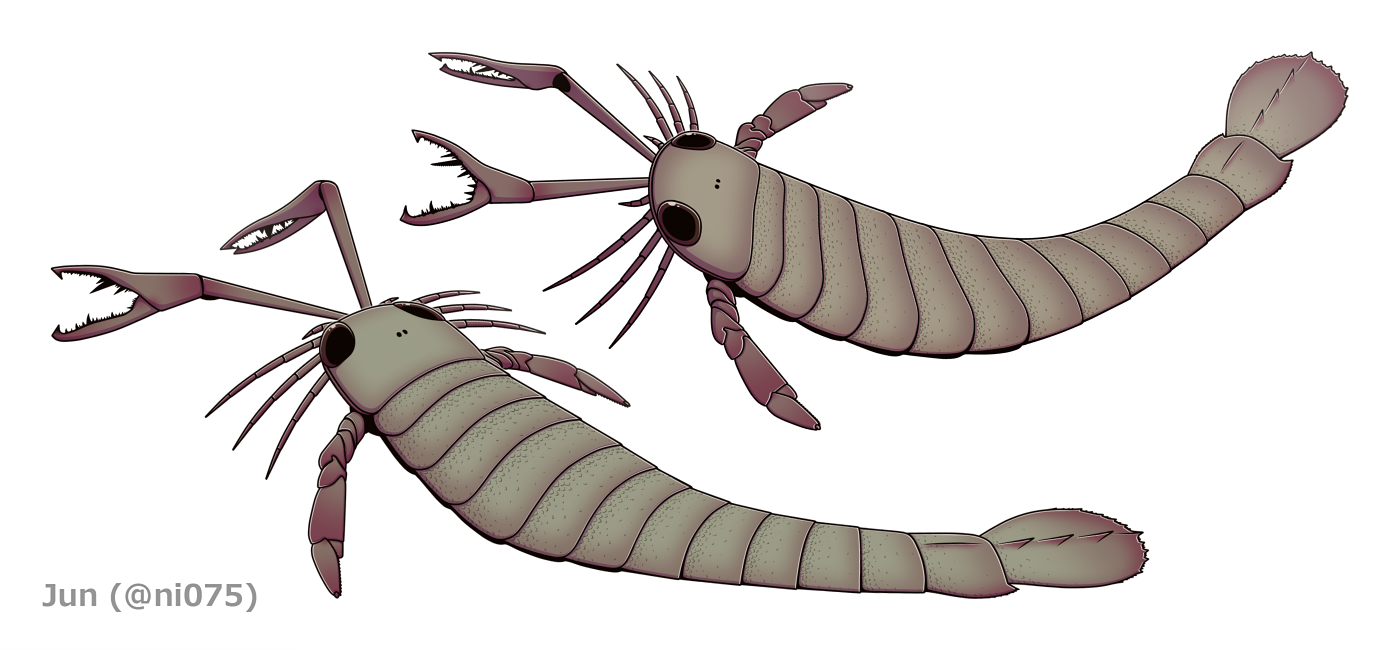
Reconstruction of A. macrophthalmus (left) and A. cummingsi (right)

Acutiramus was one of the largest eurypterids, perhaps only smaller than the gigantic Jaekelopterus rhenaniae. At a length of 2.1 metres (6.9 feet), A. bohemicus is the largest known species of the genus, whilst the smallest were A. floweri and A. perryensis both at a length of 20 cm (7.9 in). The body of Acutiramus was very slender, with members of the genus being almost five times as long as they were wide.

Acutiramus can be distinguished from other pterygotids by the distal margin of the chelae (pincers), where the final tooth is at an acute angle relative to the rest of the claw. The large tooth in the center of the claw is distally inclined (points forwards). The prosoma (head) is subquadrate (nearly square-shaped), with compound eyes located at the edge of the front corners. The telson (the posteriormost segment of its body) has a low row of knobs running down its center.

Acutiramus is classified as part of the pterygotid family of eurypterids, a group of highly derived eurypterids of the Silurian to Devonian periods that differ from other groups by a number of features, perhaps most prominently in the chelicerae (the first pair of limbs) and the telson. The chelicerae of the Pterygotidae were enlarged and robust, clearly adapted to be used for active prey capture and more similar to the claws of some modern crustaceans, with well-developed teeth on the claws, than to the chelicerae of other eurypterid groups. Another feature distinguishing the group from other eurypterid groups were their flattened and expanded telsons, likely used as rudders when swimming. Their walking legs were small and slender, without spines, and they were likely not capable of walking on land.

A. bohemicus was once estimated to have reached lengths of 2.3 to 2.5 metres (7.5 to 8.2 ft) based on the largest known chelicerae and coxae. This would have made it the largest known arthropod, but recent estimates have revised the upper size limits to 2.1 metres (6.9 feet). A. bohemicus is surpassed in size among the eurypterids only by Jaekelopterus rhenaniae, which measured 2.5 metres (8.2 feet) in length. Likewise, A. cummingsi was also once thought to have been the largest eurypterid (before the discovery of larger individuals in Acutiramus and Jaekelopterus), with fragmentary fossils suggesting great lengths. The largest preserved tergite suggests that the species could grow up to 1.65 metres in length, while a gnathobase (a lower appendage used to macerate, or soften and cut, food) from Buffalo was estimated to have belonged to a specimen reaching 2 metres (6.6 feet) in length. A. macropthalmus was also large in size, with fragmentary tergites from Litchfield, New York suggesting sizes in the range of 1.65 to 2 metres (5.4 to 6.6 ft).

== History of research ==
=== Original description as Pterygotus ===
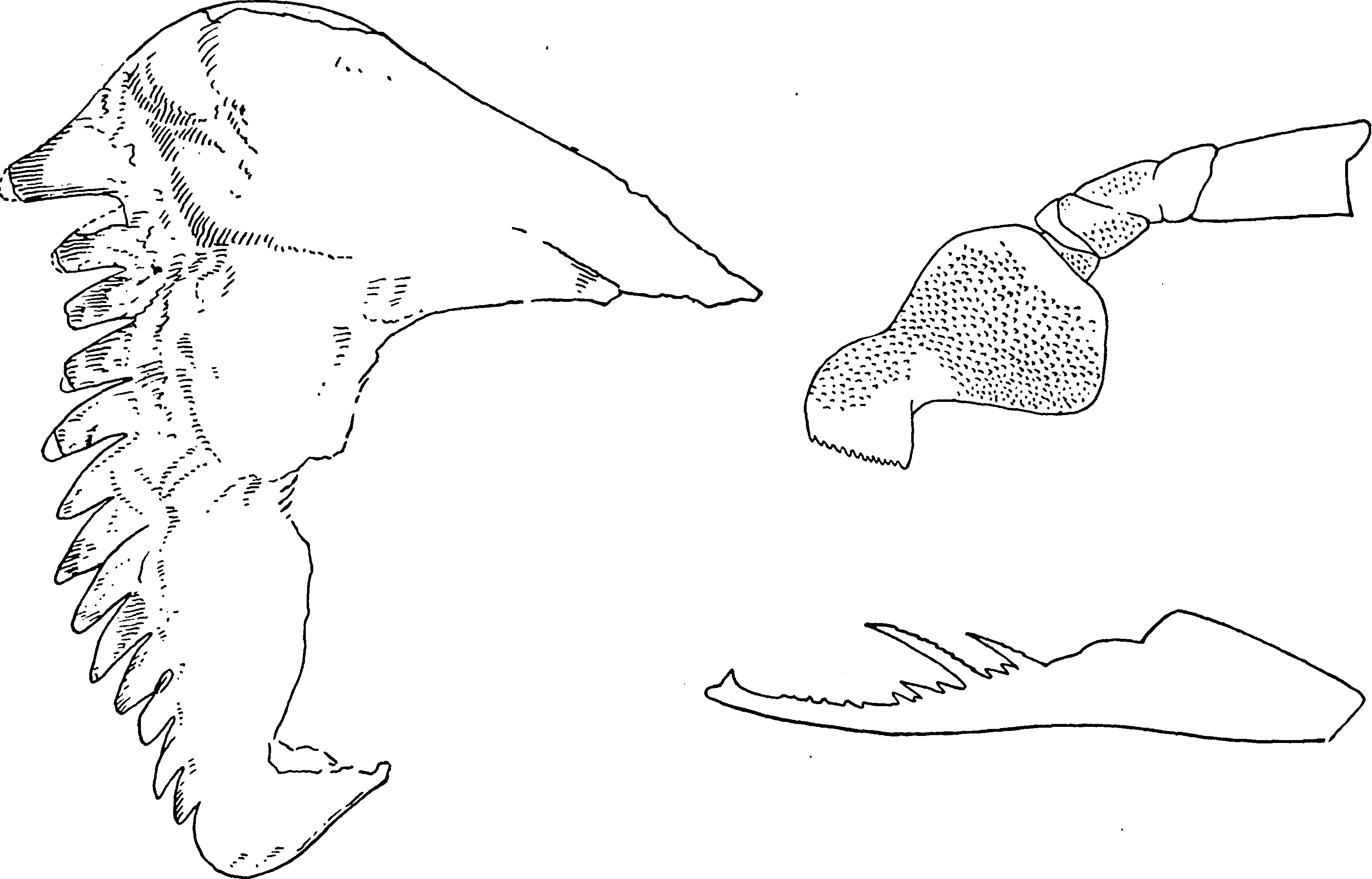
The type specimen of A. cummingsi (a coxa, left) and the type specimen of "Pterygotus buffaloensis" (an appendage including the coxa and part of a chelae, right).

The earliest species of Acutiramus to be named was A. macropthalmus (as a species of Pterygotus, Pterygotus macrophthalmus) in 1859. The type specimen, the carapace of a young individual, was discovered in waterlime deposits of Upper Silurian age in Litchfield, New York. At virtually the same time, the type specimen of another species of Pterygotus, P. osborni, was described from the same locality, this specimen preserving the prosoma and four abdominal segments but not the carapace. Later more complete remains from the locality allowed the two species to be synonymized in 1912 by John Mason Clarke and Rudolf Ruedemann as the fossils of P. osborni proved identical to more complete remains referred to P. marcophthalmus.

A. bohemicus was likewise first named as a species of Pterygotus in 1872 based on an incomplete coxa (L23505) from the Přídolí Formation, Upper Silurian in age. Since the discovery of that specimen, other fossils referred to A. bohemicus have yielded other parts of the body, including chelicerae, more coxae, segments of the appendages, genital appendages and incomplete metastomas (a large plate that is part of the abdomen) and telsons. Furthermore, some Early Devonian Acutiramus fossils found in Australia have been tentatively assigned to A. bohemicus, although it is possible that they represent a new species.

The species that would eventually be designated as the type species of Acutiramus, A. cummingsi, was described as Pterygotus cummingsi in 1875, based on a fragmentary coxa (the base of the leg, with which it attaches to the body) of the fourth walking leg discovered during quarrying operations in cement rock near Buffalo, New York. Another species, P. buffaloensis would be named six years later based on an incomplete fourth walking leg with the coxa included. Clarke and Ruedemann synonymized these taxa in 1912, choosing P. buffaloensis as the name because they considered P. cummingsi to "not be properly defined".

The principal differences between A. cummingsi and other species of Acutiramus is in its telson. The telson of A. cummingsi is not as obovate (ovate with a narrow end at its base) or elongated as that of A. macrophthalmus (which possesses a telson that is six times as long as it is wide), the telson of A. cummingsi is most often just as long as it is wide. The shape of the metastoma of A. bohemicus has been compared to other species in the genus, especially to that of A. cummingsi, which preserves a metastoma that is almost identical in morphology. A. bohemicus is generally agreed to be the species closest in relation to A. cummingsi, though they are differentiated by characteristics in the dentition of the chelae, many of the teeth being larger in A. bohemicus. There may be additional differences, but the incomplete nature of the A. bohemicus material makes further comparisons impossible.

=== Identification as separate genus ===
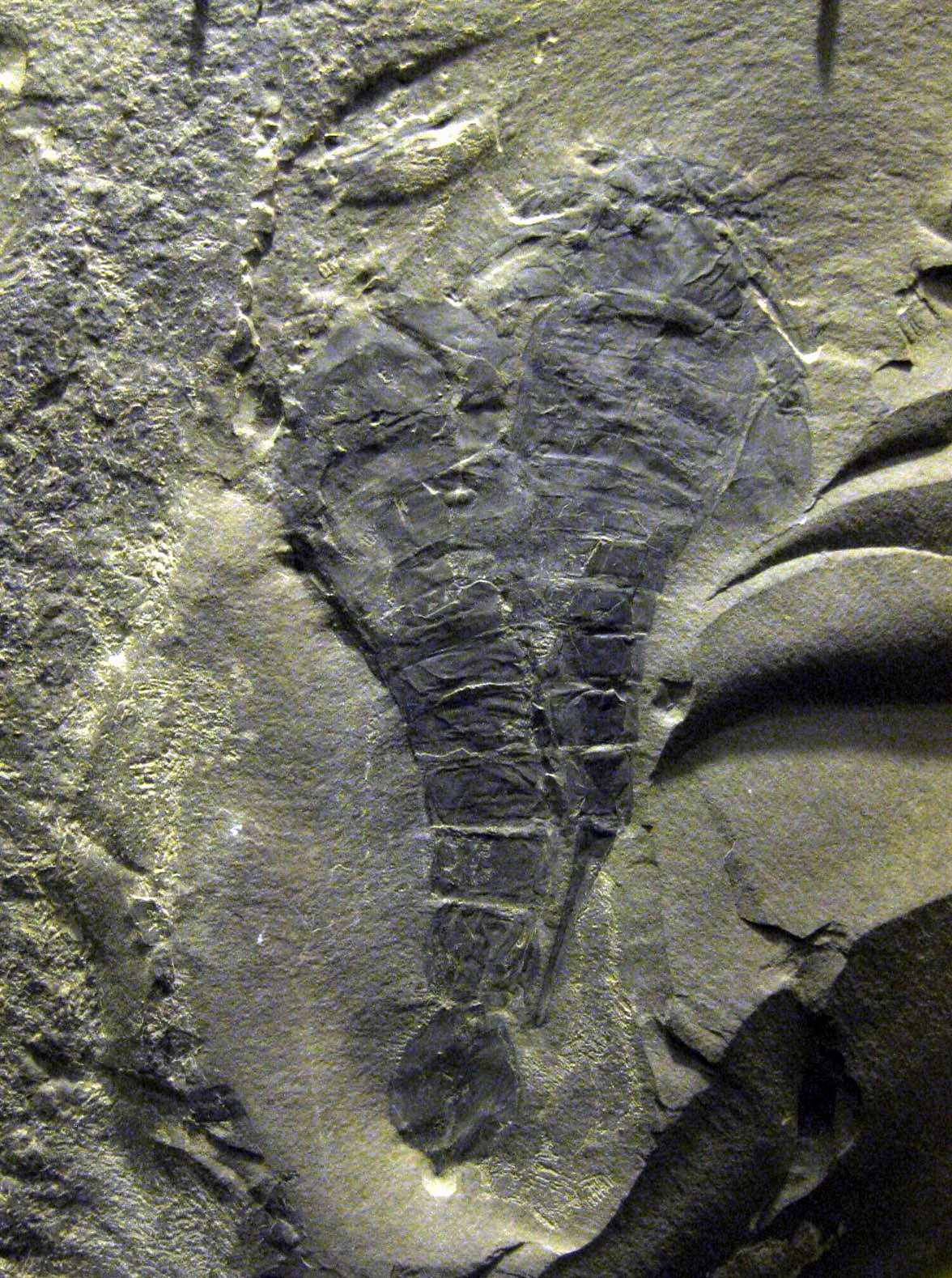
Fossil of A. cummingsi (left) and Eurypterus remipes, Schiele Museum of Natural History, North Carolina.

Clarke and Ruedemann noted in 1912 that P. macrophthalmus was easily distinguished from other species of Pterygotus. While it was obviously closely related to P. anglicus based on features of the telson, the two species could easily be differentiated by several characteristics, notably the fishhook-like shape of the teeth of the chelae (claws) and the direction they pointed in being different. These features of the claw were noted as being similar to those of P. osiliensis, a species with a highly distinct bilobed telson. Furthermore, Clarke and Ruedemann noted that P. macrophthalmus appeared to have a free ramus intermediate in shape between species of Pterygotus and A. cummingsi. With the exception of the primary tooth, which is long and curved, all teeth on the claws are small and lack serrations. The gnathobase is similar to that of A. cummingsi, and A. macrophthalmus would likely possess appendages and carapaces that are similar in form and size.

With species being named as part of Pterygotus becoming increasingly diverse, researchers began to name subgenera, such as Pterygotus (Erettopterus), named by John William Salter in 1859 for species of Pterygotus with a bilobed telson, such as P. osiliensis. The family Pterygotidae would be erected by Clarke & Ruedemann in 1912, and new subgenera were named for Pterygotus by Ruedemann in 1935. These subgenera included Pterygotus (Curviramus) and Pterygotus (Acutiramus) and were differentiated from other Pterygotus by the curvature of the denticles (teeth) of the chelicerae. The name "Acutiramus" derives from Latin acuto ("acute" or "sharp") and Latin ramus ("branch"), referring to the acute angle of the final tooth of the claws relative to the rest of the claw. The species originally included in the subgenus were P. (A.) bohemicus, P. (A.) buffaloensis and P. (A.) macrophthalmus. P. buffaloensis was designated as the type species of the subgenus Acutiramus. Adhering to the rule of nomenclatural priority, the earliest used name should have priority. This was pointed out by Erik N. Kjellesvig-Waering in a 1955 publication, stating that using P. buffaloensis over P. cummingsi was "subjective" and in 1961, Kjellesvig-Waering recognised P. cummingsi as the name of the type species. Acutiramus continued to be treated as a subgenus of Pterygotus until it was raised to the level of a separate genus by Leif Størmer in 1974.

=== Discovery of further species ===
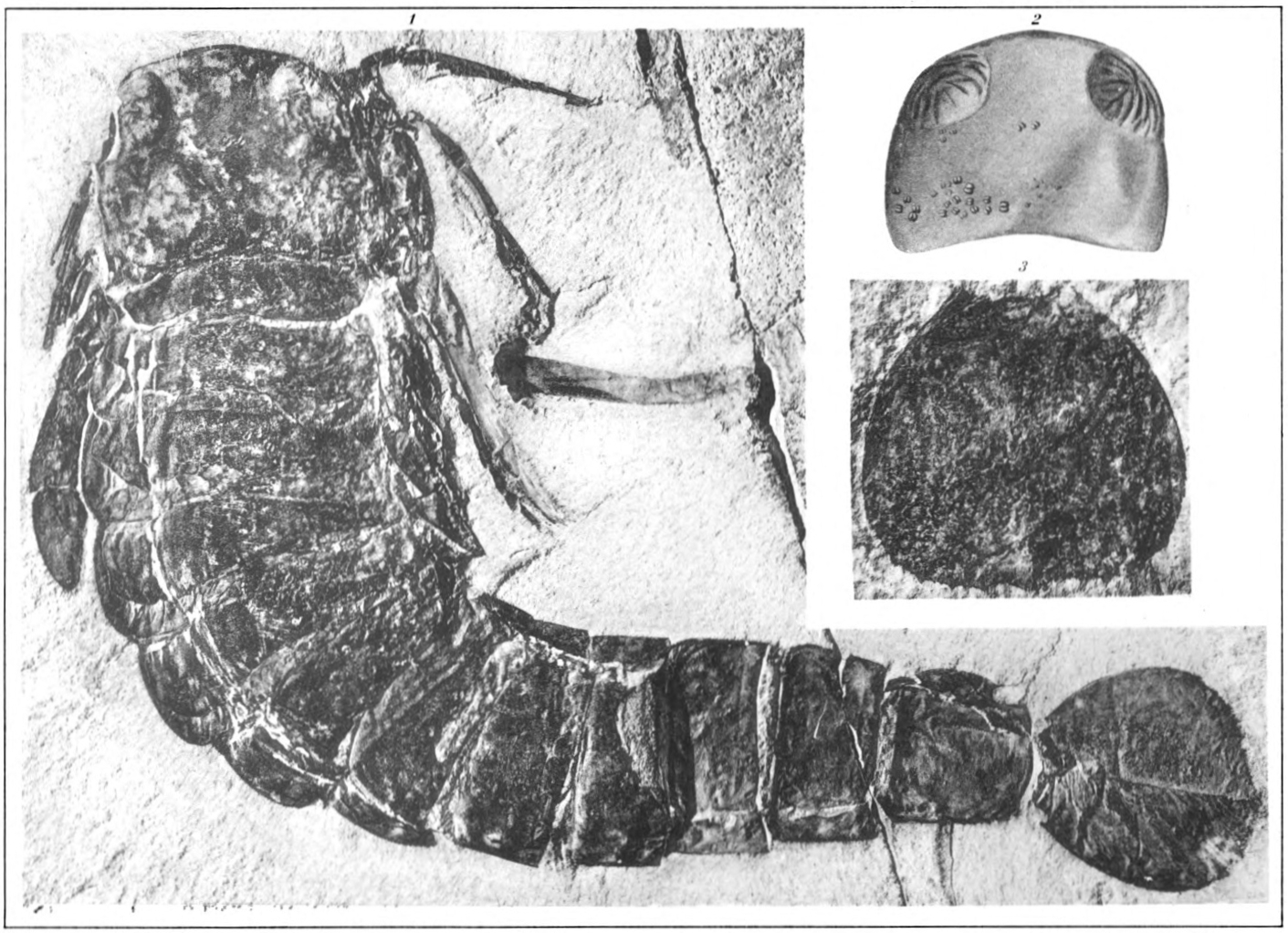
Fossils of A. cummingsi.

A. floweri was described in 1955, based on a single fossilized claw (NYSM 10712), preserving the fixed and free rami and parts of the palm. The fossil was recovered from Oneida Creek, located to the southeast of Kenwood, New York, in deposits that suggest that it lived in a lagoonal environment in the Ludfordian stage of the Silurian. A. floweri occurred together with other eurypterids, notably Eurypterus pittsfordensis and, more rarely, Mixopterus.

A. suwanneensis was named from a single specimen in 1955. The specimen includes the part and counterpart of an almost complete fixed ramus and hand of a chelicera. Together, the ramus and hand of the chelicera measure 31 mm in length. The chelicera is similar to that of other species in the genus and to other members of the Pterygotidae with the hand being rectangular and measuring about 7 mm in length. A highly fragmentary species, A. suwanneensis can be distinguished from other Acutiramus by the numerous teeth in its chelicerae that, while high in number, are not as many as in other species of the genus. Additionally, the central and main tooth (measuring 5.7 mm, or 0.2 inches, in length) is pointed forward but lacks the serrations commonly present in other species. Overall, the morphology of the chelicerae of A. suwanneensis is thin and slender. Estimates of the total length of the species revealed that it would have been relatively small, measuring at most 45.7 cm (18.0 in) in length. As such, it has been speculated that it might represent a juvenile or subadult, the lack of serrations on the teeth could be due to its possibly juvenile nature. Later size estimates place its length at 50 cm (20 in). The fossil was recovered in a core from the Gulf Oil Corporation in Columbia County, Florida and was dated to have been Upper Silurian in age. The fossil was found associated with fragmentary remains of Ceratiocaris, a genus of phyllocarid crustaceans.

A. perneri was named in honour of Czech paleontologist Jaroslav Perner in 1994 and is known from fossilized remains consisting of several chelicerae, operculum with a genital appendage, coxae and several fragmentary body segments. The species was originally included in A. bohemicus, which is very similar and is known from the same time and region. The pattern of denticulation on the chelicerae is virtually identical, but the chelicerae themselves are slightly more narrow, with more angled tips and the teeth are less prominent and shorter. A. perneri was regarded as a direct descendant of A. bohemicus by Chlupáč (1994). Using measurements of preserved chelicerae, the maximum body length of A. perneri was originally estimated to have been between 1.4 and 1.6 metres (4.6 and 5.2 ft), later being revised to 1.1 metres (3.6 feet). Just like A. bohemicus, A. perneri occurs in Bohemia (in the Czech Republic), though in strata of Lochkovian (earliest Devonian) age.

In addition, it has been demonstrated that the enigmatic arthropod Bunodella horrida from the Silurian, known from one single fossil, actually represents the coxa of a swimming leg of an indeterminate species of Acutiramus. The type species of Bunodella, NBMG 3000 (housed at the New Brunswick Museum), is incomplete and poorly preserved, but shows the characteristic ornamentation of the pterygotids composed of semilunate scales. The first to eight denticles of originally twelve or thirteen are also preserved. The enlarged anterior denticle and the curvature present in the anterior margin of the coxal neck suggest an assignment to Acutiramus rather than other genera in Pterygotidae. However, B. horrida has not been formally synonymized with Acutiramus due to the lack of more diagnostic material, and therefore remains as a dubious name.

== Classification ==
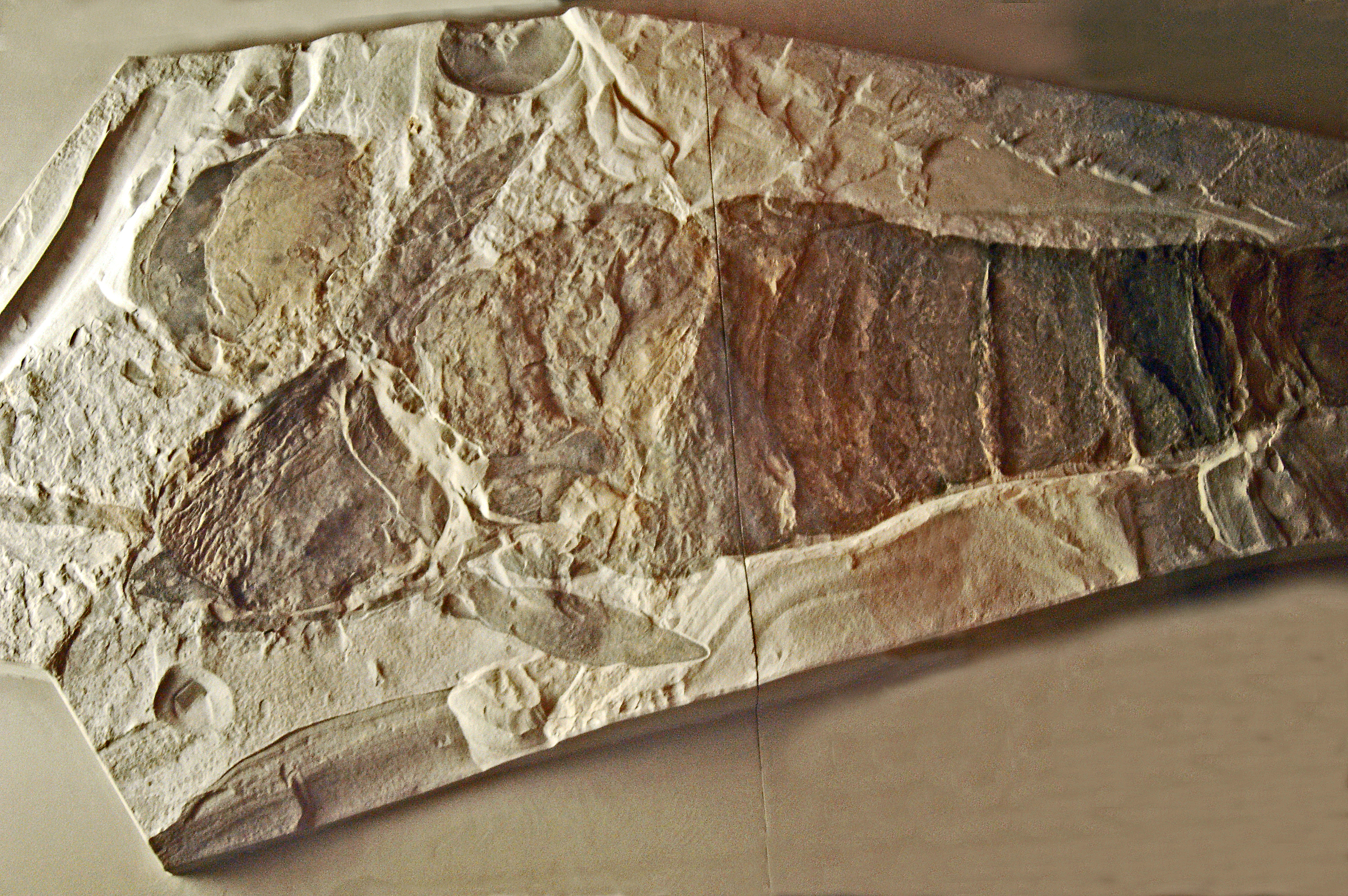
Fossil of A. macrophthalmus exhibited at the Royal Ontario Museum, Toronto.

Acutiramus is classified within the family Pterygotidae in the superfamily Pterygotioidea. Acutiramus is notably similar to the other two derived giant genera of the family, Pterygotus and Jaekelopterus. Based on similarities of the genital appendage it has been suggested that the three genera could be synonymous, though differences have been noted in chelicerae, chelicerae have been questioned as the basis of generic distinctions in eurypterids since their morphology is dependent on lifestyle and vary throughout ontogeny. Genital appendages can vary even within genera, for instance the genital appendage of Acutiramus changes from species to species, being spoon-shaped in earlier species and then becoming bilobed and eventually beginning to look similar to the appendage of Jaekelopterus. An inclusive phylogenetic analysis with multiple species of Acutiramus, Pterygotus and Jaekelopterus is required to resolve whether or not the genera are synonyms of each other.

The cladogram below is based on the nine best-known pterygotid species and two outgroup taxa (Slimonia acuminata and Hughmilleria socialis). The cladogram also contains the maximum sizes reached by the species in question, which have been suggested to possibly have been an evolutionary trait of the group per Cope's rule ("phyletic gigantism").

- Pterygotioidea
  - Hughmilleria socialis (20 cm)
  - - Slimonia acuminata (100 cm)
    - - Pterygotidae
        - Ciurcopterus ventricosus (70 cm)
        - - - Erettopterus waylandsmithi (60 cm)
            - Erettopterus osiliensis (90 cm)
            - - Erettopterus serricaudatus (60 cm)
              - Erettopterus bilobus (70 cm)
          - - Pterygotus anglicus (160 cm)
            - - Jaekelopterus rhenaniae (250 cm)
              - - Acutiramus macrophthalmus (200 cm)
                - Acutiramus bohemicus (210 cm)

== Paleobiology ==
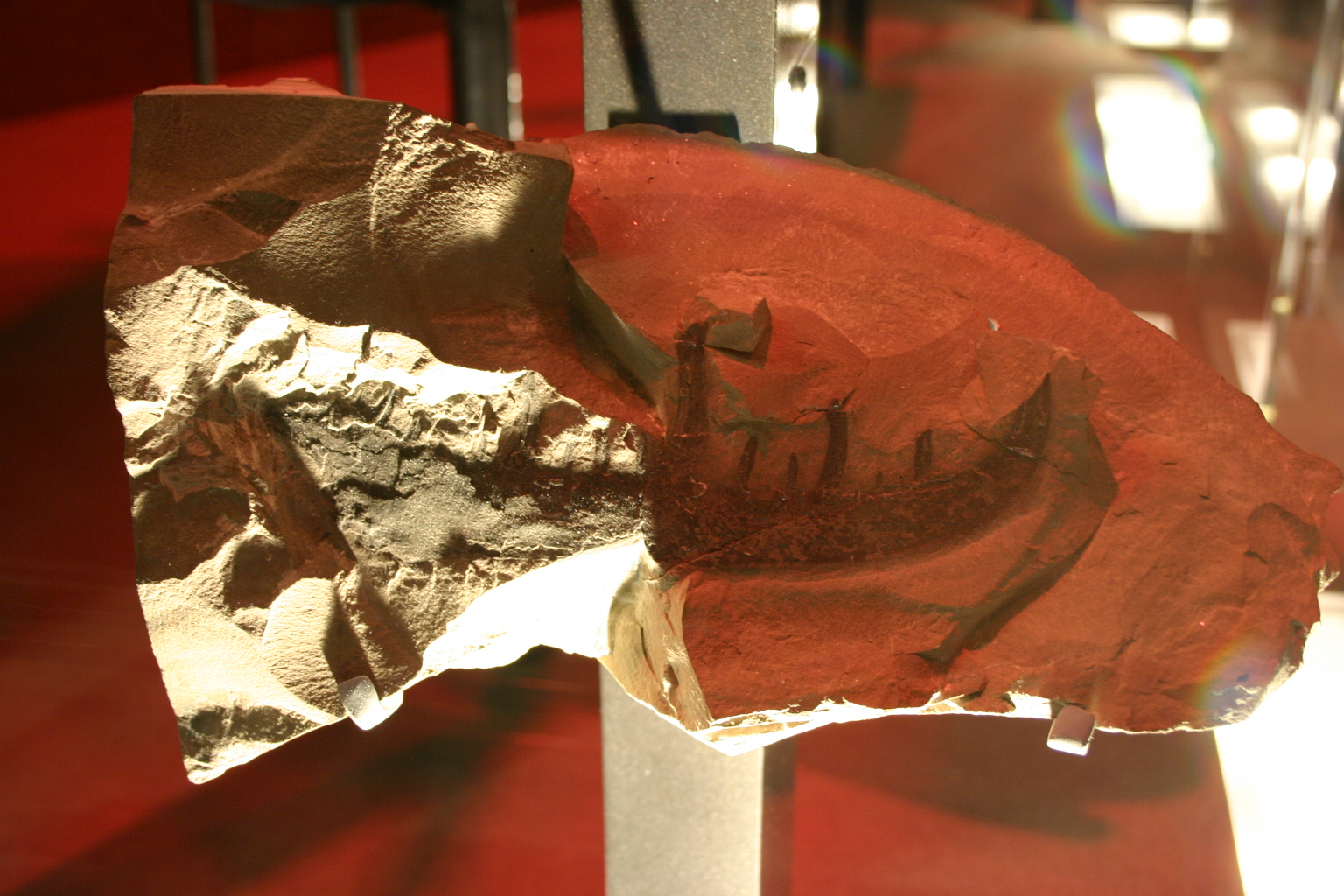
Claw of A. cummingsi.

The cheliceral morphology and visual acuity of the pterygotid eurypterids separates them into distinct ecological groups. The primary method for determining visual acuity in arthropods is by determining the number of lenses in their compound eyes and the interommatidial angle (shortened as IOA and referring to the angle between the optical axes of the adjacent lenses). The IOA is especially important as it can be used to distinguish different ecological roles in arthropods, being low in modern active arthropod predators.

In contrast to all other pterygotid genera, notably the very visually acute Pterygotus and Jaekelopterus, the eyes of Acutiramus were low in visual acuity (with few lenses in the compound eyes and high IOA values), inconsistent with the traditionally assumed pterygotid lifestyle of "active and high-level visual predators". The IOA values of Acutiramus changed during ontogeny but in a way opposite to other pterygotids. Vision becomes less acute in larger specimens, whilst vision tends to get more acute in adults in other genera, such as in Jaekelopterus. Pterygotids may thus have been almost equally visually acute early in their life cycle, becoming more differentiated during growth.

The size of the largest (A. bohemicus) and smallest (A. floweri) species of Acutiramus compared to a human.

The chelicerae of other pterygotids mainly served grasping functions and could also potentially be used for crushing and puncturing in Pterygotus and Jaekelopterus, with large and robust claws. In contrast, the chelicerae of Acutiramus likely served a slicing or shearing function. The chelicerae themselves were large, but with differentiated denticles out of which one was serrated, long and strongly inclined.

The differences from other pterygotids on the basis of visual acuity and the morphology of the claws indicates that Acutiramus occupied an ecological role distinct from other members of the group and was a significantly less active predator. The weaker visual system and shearing claws of Acutiramus suggest that it might have been an ambush predator, or possible a scavenger, that fed on soft-bodied animals, feeding during the night or in otherwise low-light conditions.

== Paleoecology ==
In Bohemia, pterygotid eurypterids occur in strata that were once marine environments, associated with common and diverse marine fossils. A. bohemicus occurs together with trilobite fossils such as Prionopeltis and Schariya as well as in assemblages where orthocone cephalopods are common. In these regions, Acutiramus appears to have been a dominant predator, with some (though far fewer) occurrences of species of Pterygotus. Fossils tentatively classified as A. bohemicus have also been discovered in the Pragian-aged Wilson Creek Shale in Victoria, Australia. In the Silurian Cunningham Creek Formation of New Brunswick, Canada, fossils of Acutiramus occur together with fossils of various jawless fish, such as Ctenopleuron nerepisense, Thelodus macintoshi and Cyathaspis acadica. In the Pozary Formation in the Czech Republic, Acutiramus occurs together with conodonts of various genera, including Ozarkodina, Wurmiella, Oulodus, Belodella and Pseudooneotodus. The environment of both these formations was marine during the Silurian.

The Silurian-Devonian boundary did not have any noticeable impact on Acutiramus, with A. bohemicus evolving into A. perneri in Bohemia and still constituting a major part of the typical marine fauna present in its environment. The environment itself was offshore, but relatively shallow water, with some influence of benthic life and anoxic conditions but generally a pelagic living environment with normal levels of salinity. In some regions, Acutiramus represents the most commonly recovered eurypterid, such as A. bohemicus in Bohemia, but in others, notably in southern Ontario, Canada (A. macrophthalmus and A. cummingsi) and Williamsville, New York (A. cummingsi) the genus represents a very rare component of the fauna.

== See also ==
- List of eurypterid genera
- Timeline of eurypterid research
- Pterygotidae
- Jaekelopterus
- Pterygotus
