= Nestor Ivanovich Novozhilov =

Soviet paleontologist

Nestor Ivanovich Novozhilov was a Soviet paleontologist. In 1948, Novozhilov described a pliosaur specimen discovered on the banks of Russia's Volga Riveras a new species, Pliosaurus rossicus. The specimen, while large, was damaged during the excavation and only the skull and chest region were successfully extracted in an excavation that began in 1938.
