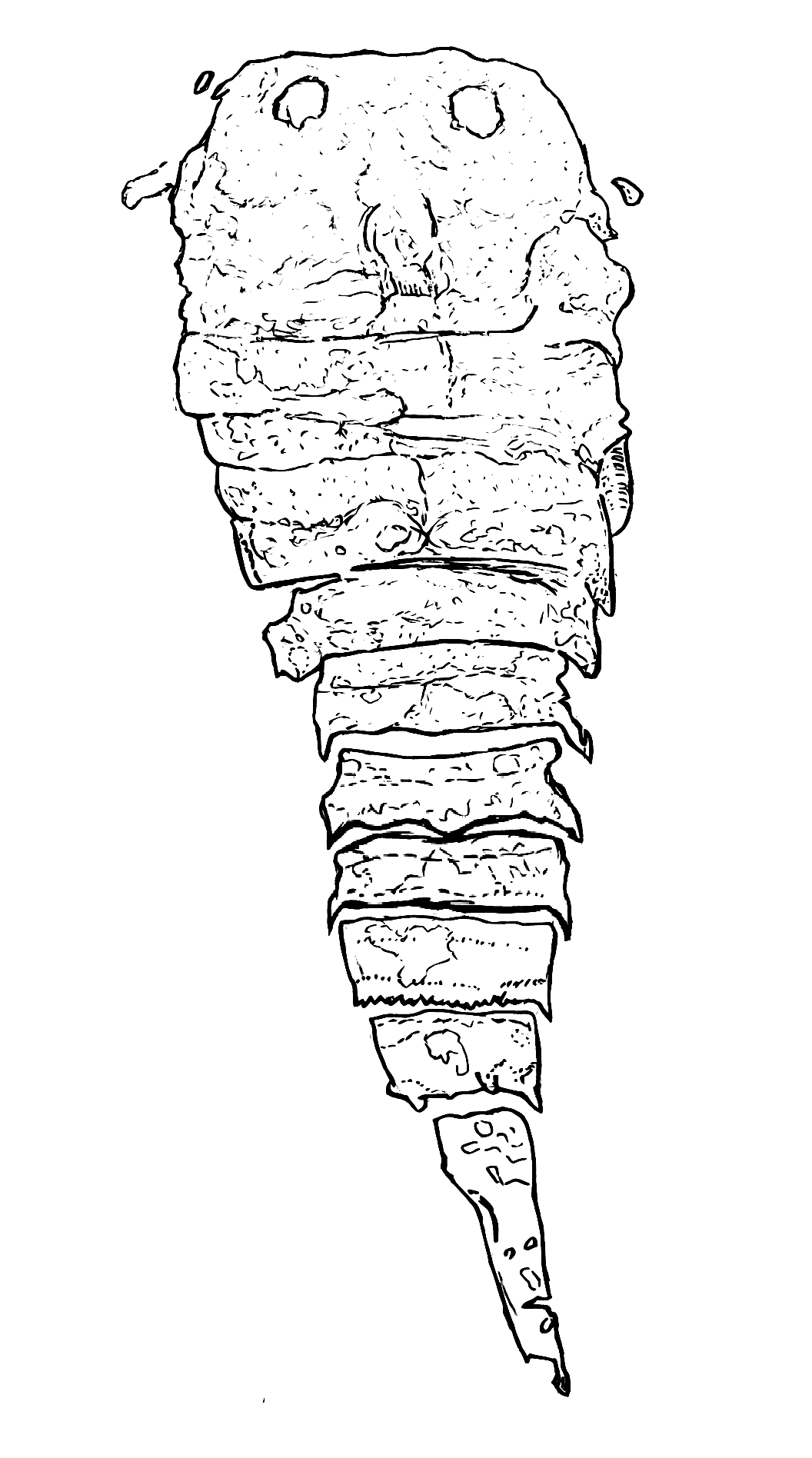
- Illustration of PWL 2014/5186-LSb, the counterpart portion of the holotype specimen of P. salgadoi

Scientific classification
- Kingdom: Animalia
- Phylum: Arthropoda
- Subphylum: Chelicerata
- Order: †Eurypterida
- Superfamily: †Adelophthalmoidea
- Family: †Parahughmilleriidae
- Genus: †Pruemopterus; Poschmann, 2020
- Species: †P. salgadoi

Binomial name
- †Pruemopterus salgadoi Poschmann, 2020

= Pruemopterus =

Pruemopterus Temporal range: Lower Emsian, 407.6 Ma

Extinct genus of arthropods

Pruemopterus is a genus of eurypterid, an extinct group of aquatic arthropods. The type and only species of Pruemopterus, P. salgadoi, is known only from a single fossil specimen discovered in geological deposits of Early Devonian age in Germany. The name of the genus is derived from the Prüm river and the surrounding Prüm valley, which contains the finding place of the fossil, and the Ancient Greek πτερόν (pteron, "wing"), referring to the eurypterid swimming paddles, and the species name honors the Brazilian photographer and photojournalist Sebastião Salgado.

Pruemopterus was a very small eurypterid, with the only known specimen measuring about 2.5 centimeters (0.98 in) in length. Although superficially similar to the related genus Parahughmilleria, Pruemopterus can be distinguished from other adelophthalmoid eurypterids by several features, most notably its wide and vaguely rectangular carapace (head plate) and its rounded, rather than elongated, eyes. Pruemopterus lived alongside other Early Devonian animals, including several other eurypterid genera, in a shallow brackish to fresh water environment.

== Description ==
Pruemopterus was a very small eurypterid, only measuring about 2.5 centimeters (0.98 in) in length. The carapace (head plate) of Pruemopterus was vaguely rectangular in shape, and was about 3.8 millimeters (0.15 in) long and 7.5 millimeters (0.3 in) wide. The compound eyes of Pruemopterus were round and placed in an anterior centrimesial (forward-central) position. Along the seventh to twelfth segments of the opisthosoma (posterior body), Pruemopterus had strong lateral epimera ("extensions" along the edges). The posterior body of Pruemopterus was relatively wide, with the pretelson (the last body segment, before the tail) being about half as long as it was wide. The telson ("tail") itself was lanceolate (lance-shaped) and robust. As in other adelophthalmoids, the walking legs of Pruemopterus were spiniferous (having spines). Though they are only preserved fragmentarily, the amount of spinosity (how spiniferous the legs were) appears to have been similar to the related Adelophthalmus. The genital appendage (a ventral "rod" part of the reproductive system) is present in the only known specimen but it is poorly preserved, with its distal end missing. It spanned from the first to the third sternite (ventral half of the body segment) and was of type A, that is, the specimen was female.

== History of research ==
The only known specimen of Pruemopterus was discovered by the German paleontologist Markus J. Poschmann in the 1980s. It was discovered in a now disused sandstone quarry within the municipality of Hermespand, close to the village itself and to that of Willwerath, in Weinsheim, Germany. The fossil deposits the specimen was uncovered in belong to the Klerf Formation and are of Early Devonian age, specifically the uppermost Lower Emsian epoch.

The fossil was not formally described by Poschmann until 2020, when he determined that the combination of traits displayed suggested that it was an adelophthalmoid eurypterid similar to Parahughmilleria, known from the same deposits, but differing in features of its carapace, opisthosoma and telson. Poschmann thus named the new genus and species Pruemopterus salgadoi to accommodate the specimen. The specimen is today housed at the Generaldirektion Kulturelles Erbe, Direktion Landesarchäologie/Erdgeschichte in Koblenz, Germany, and is part of the State Collection of Natural History of Rhineland-Palatinate. Originally given the provisional designation 355-D by Poschmann, the specimen now has the repository number PWL 2014/5186-LS a,b (a being the part and b being the counterpart of the compression fossil).

The generic name Pruemopterus is derived from the Prüm river and the surrounding Prüm valley, wherein Hermespand and Willwerath are located, and the suffix '-opterus', derived from the Ancient Greek πτερόν (pteron, "wing"), often used in naming eurypterids due to the broad, wing-like swimming appendages of the eurypterine suborder. The species name salgadoi honors the Brazilian photographer and photojournalist Sebastião Salgado.

== Classification ==
Poschmann referred Pruemopterus to the eurypterid family Adelophthalmidae, then considered the only family within the superfamily Adelophthalmoidea. In particular, Poschmann noted that morphological comparisons with other adelophthalmid genera suggest that Pruemopterus was most closely related to Parahughmilleria. Still, Pruemopterus differs from other adelophthalmoid eurypterids mainly in features of its carapace and its eyes. The short and rectangular carapace of Pruemopterus, and its eyes being rounded rather than elongated, easily distinguishes the genus from the adelophthalmid genera Pittsfordipterus, Bassipterus, Nanahughmilleria and Adelophthalmus. The same also applies to Parahughmilleria, which lived during the same epoch as Pruemopterus, although the species Parahughmilleria hefteri (possibly a younger growth stage of the species Parahughmilleria major) is superficially similar to Pruemopterus in its streamlined body shape and the lateral epimera along the same segments of the opisthosoma. Pruemopterus can be distinguished from Parahughmilleria hefteri by several features, including its more centrally positioned and rounder eyes, its wider carapace, the epimera being much more prominent, and the telson being broader and more robust. Another difference between Pruemopterus and Parahughmilleria is that the opisthosomal segments of Pruemopterus are more or less constant in length, whereas they increase in length posteriorly in Parahughmilleria. The genus Unionopterus, probably an adelophthalmid, is fragmentarily known, which complicates comparisons, but is clearly different from Pruemopterus in its smaller eyes and the wider marginal rim of its carapace.

Poschmann also noted in his description of the type specimen that there were also close similarities to the Hughmilleriidae in the Pterygotioidea superfamily, though Pruemopterus differed from the genera in that family in having prominent lateral epimera on its opisthosomal segments (a feature for the most part missing among the hughmilleriids) and its eyes not being placed on the margin of the carapace.

In a 2025 eurypterid monograph, James Lamsdell placed Pruemopterus in the family Parahughmilleriidae in Adelophthalmoidea, placing Pruemopterus as the sister taxon of Parahughmilleria. The cladogram below follows the phylogenetic analysis of Lamsdell (2025).

- Adelophthalmoidea
  - Nanahughmilleriidae
    - Nanahughmilleria notosiberica
    - - Nanahughmilleria clarkei
      - Nanahughmilleria norvegica
  - - Parahughmilleriidae
      - Pruemopterus salgadoi
      - - Parahughmilleria pygmaea
        - - Parahughmilleria hefteri
          - Parahughmilleria fuea
    - - Pittsfordipteridae
        - Archopterus anjiensis
        - - Bassipterus bellistriata
          - - Pittsfordipterus maria
            - Pittsfordipterus phelpsae
      - Adelophthalmidae
        - Wiedopterus noctua
        - Adelophthalmus
          - - Adelophthalmus sievertsi
            - Adelophthalmus waterstoni
          - - Adelophthalmus luceroensis
            - - Adelophthalmus irinae
              - Adelophthalmus kamyshtensis
            - - Adelophthalmus zadrai
              - - Adelophthalmus imhofi
                - Adelophthalmus wilsoni
              - - Adelophthalmus granosus
                - - Adelophthalmus dumonti
                  - Adelophthalmus moyseyi
              - - Adelophthalmus approximatus
                - - - Adelophthalmus mansfieldi
                    - Adelophthalmus mazonensis
                  - - Adelophthalmus douvillei
                    - Adelophthalmus sellardsi

== Paleoecology ==
The deposits in which the Pruemopterus fossil was discovered are part of an Early Devonian fossil locality called the "Fossil-Lagerstätte Willwerath" that has yielded numerous early land plants, arthropods and vertebrates. Among the chelicerates, to which the eurypterids belong, the Early Devonian deposits have yielded both arachnids (Devonotarbus hombachensis and Xenarachne willwerathensis) and early xiphosurans (genus Willwerathia). Eurypterids are especially diverse in these deposits, accounting for five genera in addition to Pruemopterus: Jaekelopterus, Rhenopterus, Erieopterus, Adelophthalmus and Parahughmilleria. Pruemopterus appears to have lived in non-marine aquatic environments. The Early Devonian eurypterid-yielding fossil sites in the Rhineland have been interpreted as having been part of a shallow aquatic environment with brackish to fresh water, such as an estuary or a bay. The lithology of the deposits in which Pruemopterus was discovered is composed of lithified gray siltstone.

== See also ==
- List of eurypterid genera
- Timeline of eurypterid research
