= Anji Biota =

Sedimentary deposit in China

- Stratigraphic range: Hirnantian
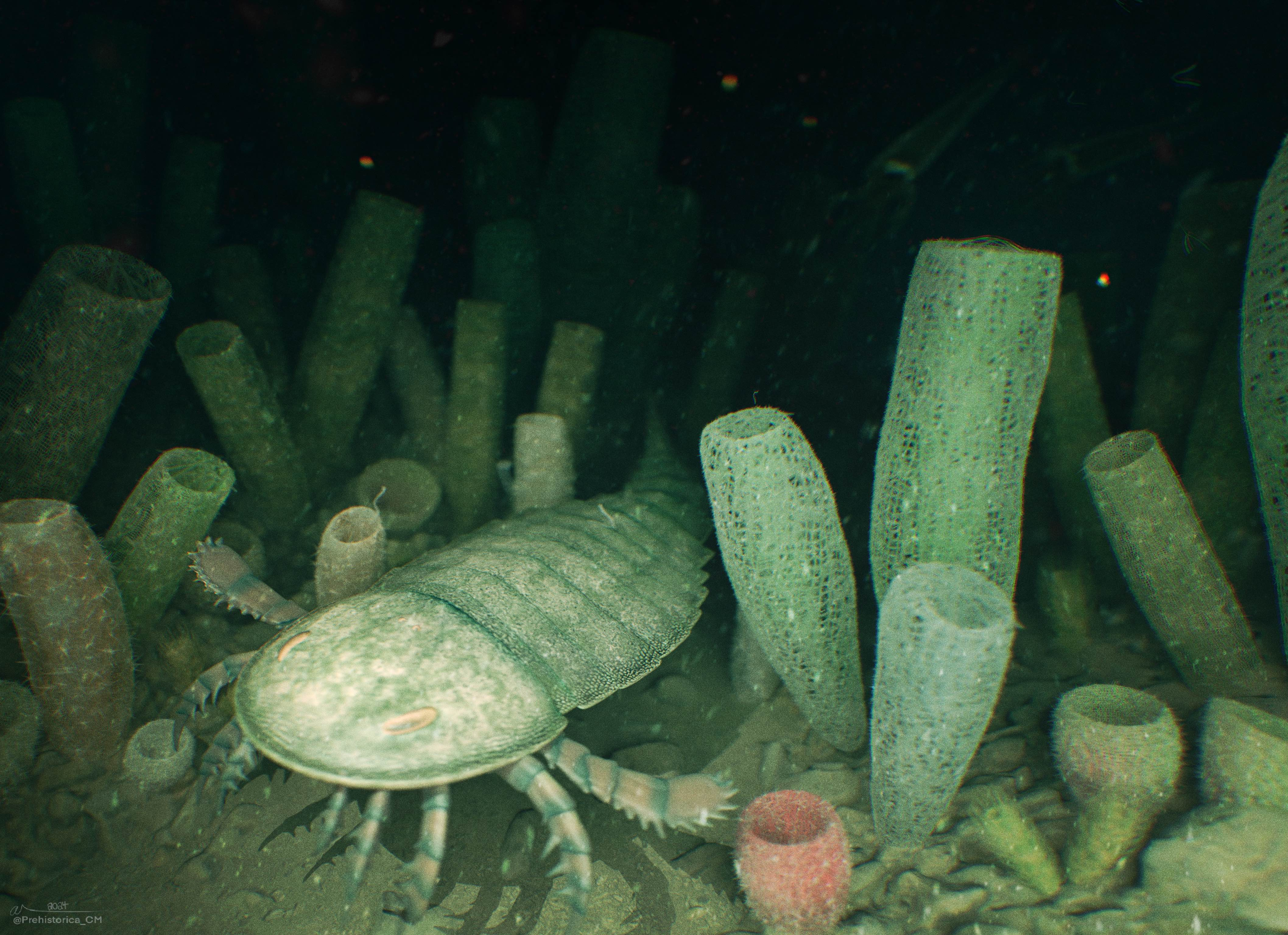
- Reconstruction of the Anji biota, with several glass sponge species and Archopterus.
- Type: Lagerstätte
- Unit of: Wenchang Formation
- Underlies: Anji Formation
- Overlies: Changwu Formation

Lithology
- Primary: Mudstone

Location
- Region: Zhejiang Province
- Country: China

The Anji biota is a lagerstätte from the latest Ordovician of China, contained within the Wenchang Formation. This lagerstätte preserves a mid-diversity fauna mostly consisting of glass sponges.

== Paleobiota ==
Color key
Taxon	Reclassified taxon	Taxon falsely reported as present	Dubious taxon or junior synonym	Ichnotaxon	Ootaxon	Morphotaxon

Notes
Uncertain or tentative taxa are in small text; ~~crossed out~~ taxa are discredited.

Paleobiota
Genus	Species	Higher taxon	Notes	Images
Archopterus	A. anjiensis	Adelophthalmidae	Earliest adelophthalmid, alongside the earliest Chinese eurypterid	Reconstruction of Archopterus in the Anji biota
Anjigraptus	A. wangi	Neodiplograptidae?	Independently evolved a morphology similar to dicranograptids	
Avitograptus	A. avitus, A. akidomorphus, A. acanthocystus	Akidograptidae (Graptolithina)	Transitional between earlier and later akidograptids	
Anjiplectella	A. davidipharus	Euplectellidae	Extends the range of Venus’ flower basket sponges back by almost 150 million years	
Archaeaphorme	A. conica	Rossellidae	Resembles the modern Aphorme, but differs in body shape and spicule characteristics	
Cannapirania	C. vermiformis	Piraniidae (Protomonaxonida)	Formerly placed within Pirania itself	
Conciliospongia	C. anjiensis	Silicea	Transitional between hexactinellids and demosponges	
Crateromorpha?	C?. (Neopsacas?) macrospicula	Rossellidae	Likely a member of an extant genus	
Eorosselloides	E. antiquus	Rossellidae	Very closely resembles the modern Rossella, but too poorly preserved to determine whether it actually belongs to the genus	
Matteolaspongia	M. hemiglobosa	Rossellidae?	Either convergently rossellid-like, or in the stem-group of the family	
Pseudanoxycalyx	P. verrucosus	Rossellidae	Convergently resembles the modern Anoxycalyx	
Shouzhispongia	S. coronata, S. prodigia	Rossellidae	One of the most common Anji sponges	
