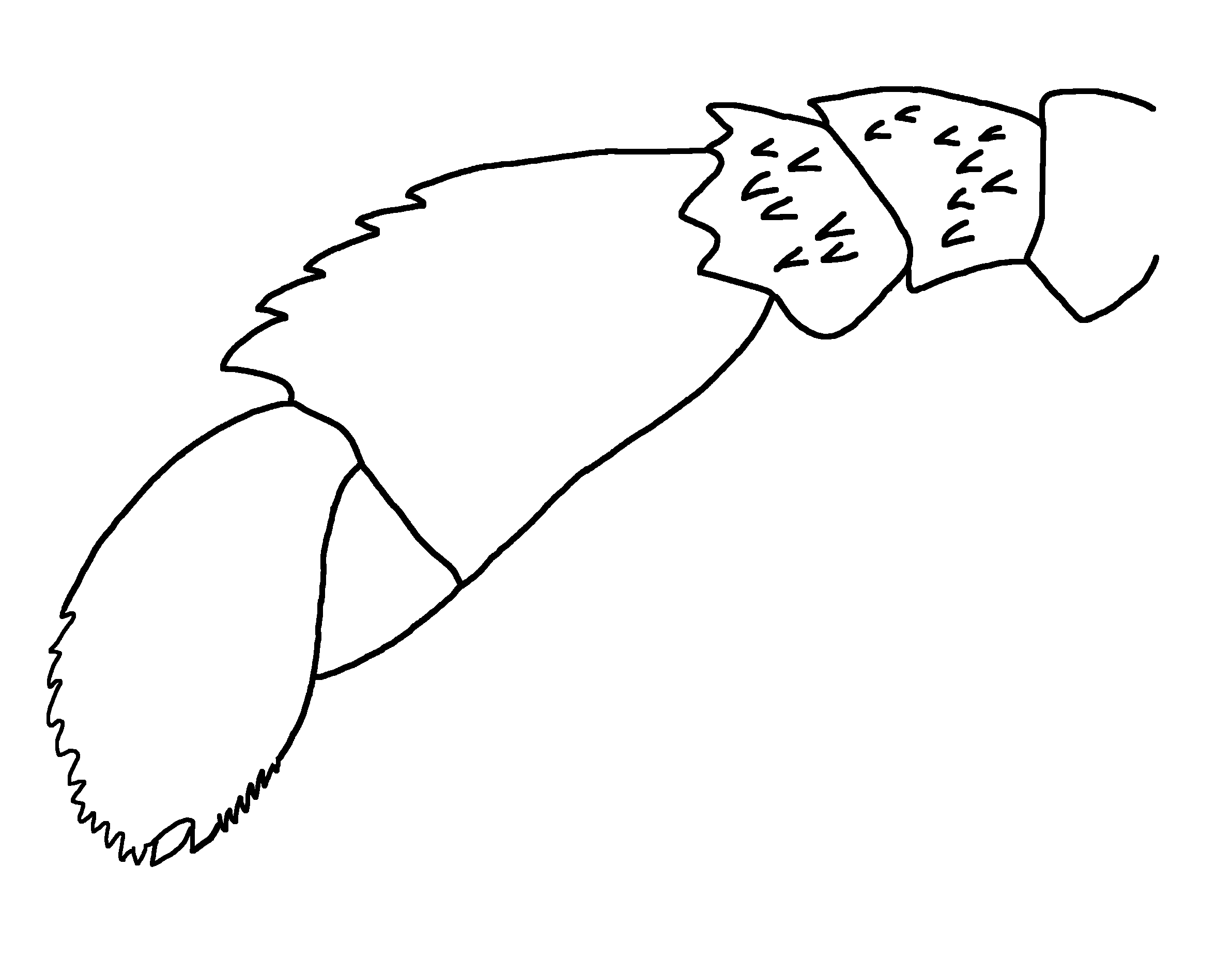
- Reconstruction of the swimming leg

Scientific classification
- Kingdom: Animalia
- Phylum: Arthropoda
- Subphylum: Chelicerata
- Order: †Eurypterida
- Superfamily: †Adelophthalmoidea
- Family: †Pittsfordipteridae
- Genus: †Bassipterus; Kjellesvig-Waering & Leutze, 1966
- Species: †B. bellistriata

Binomial name
- †Bassipterus bellistriata (Kjellesvig-Waering, 1950)

Synonyms
- Bassipterus virginicus Kjellesvig-Waering & Leutze, 1966; Hughmilleria bellistriata Kjellesvig-Waering, 1950; Parahughmilleria bellistriata (Kjellesvig-Waering, 1950)

= Bassipterus =

Bassipterus Temporal range: Late Ludlow-Early Pridoli, 425.6–422 Ma

Extinct genus of arthropods

Bassipterus ("wing from Bass") is a genus of eurypterid, an extinct group of aquatic arthropods. Bassipterus is classified as part of the family Adelophthalmidae, the only clade within the derived ("advanced") Adelophthalmoidea superfamily of eurypterids. Fossils of the single known species, B. bellistriata, have been discovered in deposits of the Late Silurian age in West Virginia and Maryland, United States. The genus is named after Bass, where most of the fossils have been recovered.

Bassipterus was a well-known basal ("primitive") genus that was distinguished from the more derived adelophthalmids by the specialization of its genital operculum (a plate-like segment which contains the genital aperture) and its long and narrow eyes, being Pittsfordipterus's closest relative.

== Description ==
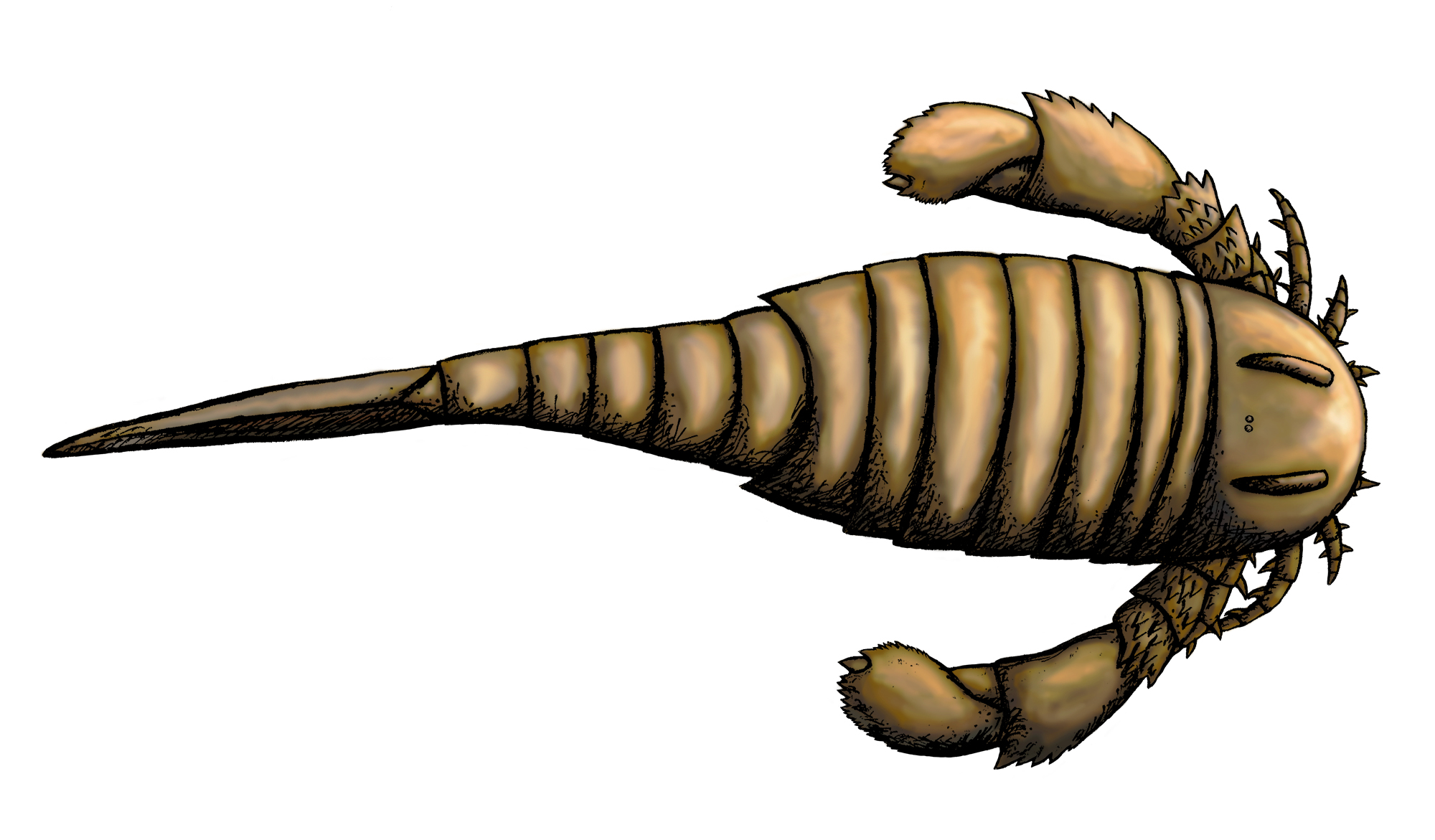
Life restoration of Bassipterus

Bassipterus is almost completely known, with the first to fifth pair of limbs and type B genital appendage being the only unknown body parts. The body had a lanceolate (lance-shaped) and streamlined shape. The prosoma ("head") was long, rounded and tray-shaped. The carapace (dorsal plate of the head) was surrounded by a narrow marginal rim, with eyes placed frontally, placed intramarginally (within the margin) and unusually long. PE 6139, a 15.2 millimeter (0.6 inch) long carapace, had eyes 4.5 mm (2 in) long and 2.2 mm (0.1 in) wide. The ocelli are preserved, and were placed in the center of the carapace, immediately behind the eyes. The metastoma (a large plate part of the abdomen) was long, truncated (shortened as by cutting it) at the base and cordate (heart-shaped) in the anterior (frontal) part. One specimen preserves a metastoma of 8.3 mm (0.3 in) in length and 5 mm (0.2 in) in width.

Of the appendages (limbs), the swimming legs (sixth pair of appendages) are the only known ones. These were of Hughmilleria-type (with enlarged seventh and eighth leg segments and the ninth very small), but in this species, it was serrated along the anterior edge of the sixth to seventh joints. The terminal joint was a sharped spur. The mesosoma (comprising body segments 1 to 6) was tapered, with the first tergite (dorsal part of the segment) considerably narrower than the rest. The metasoma (comprising segments 7 to 12) followed the tapering of the mesosoma and ended in a long dirk-like telson (the posteriormost division of the body). The telson was smooth in the ventral part, but carinated (with a keel) dorsally towards the end, which was a very sharped point. The specimen PE 6208 had a 32.5 mm (1.3 in) long telson. The ornamentation in Bassipterus is well known and developed. The carapace was covered by triangular scales. The tergites and abdominal plates had mucrones (sharped points) typical of Adelophthalmidae, but these were considerably larger and more prominent than in related genera. In some places, the mucrones touched each other and formed a rhombic ornamentation, while in others, they were so elongated that they resembled the linear striations present in the more derived ("advanced") genus Adelophthalmus.

The morphology of the genital operculum (a plate-like segment which contains the genital aperture) allows an easy differentiation between Bassipterus and the other adelophthalmids. The type A genital appendage (assumed to represent females) was long, reaching the second pair of abdominal plates, and was divided into three joints. The first had a short, triangular and hastate (with protruding lobes) portion followed by a tubular shaft that ended in two lateral triangular projections at the point of union with the following joint. The second joint was shorter and composed of three different areas. On both sides of the central shaft, two long narrow sclerites (hardened parts), possibly plates, lengthened themselves at their ends. The third joint was very short and finished in two long points reminiscent of Eurypterus, a more basal genus. The appendage in its entirety was covered by triangular mucrones which pointed outwards. The genital operculum differentiates Bassipterus from other eurypterid genera and suggests a close relationship with Pittsfordipterus.

== History of research ==
Ubication of both locations where Bassipterus fossils have been found

Bassipterus virginicus was described by the paleontologists Erik Norman Kjellesvig-Waering and Kenneth Edward Caster based on the holotype (PE 6201, an almost complete specimen), seven paratypes and dozens of fragments. Most of the fossils were found in the Wills Creek Formation of Bass, West Virginia, as well as an isolated carapace of the same formation in Cumberland, Maryland (previously referred to Hughmilleria). The name Bassipterus is translated as "wing from Bass", with the first word of the name referring to the West Virginian unincorporated community of Bass and the last word composed of the Greek word πτερόν (pteron, wing). Although Kjellesvig-Waering and Caster initially classified Bassipterus in the family Hughmilleriidae, Victor P. Tollerton Jr. moved the genus along with others to the new family Adelophthalmidae.

In 2004, the paleontologist Odd Erik Tetlie concluded that Bassipterus virginicus was a synonym of Parahughmilleria bellistriata and the more basal Stoermeropterus nodosus. Although subsequent authors have followed this study, the most accepted phylogenetic classification places Bassipterus together with Pittsfordipterus, forming a basal clade. In 2025, James Lamsdell synonymized Bassipterus virginicus and Parahughmilleria bellistriata. P. bellistriata was named first, and as such that name holds priority, but since it was determined to be distinct at the genus level, the new combination of the species became Bassipterus bellistriata. Lamsdell recovered Stoermeropterus nodosus as distinct and only distantly related.

== Classification ==
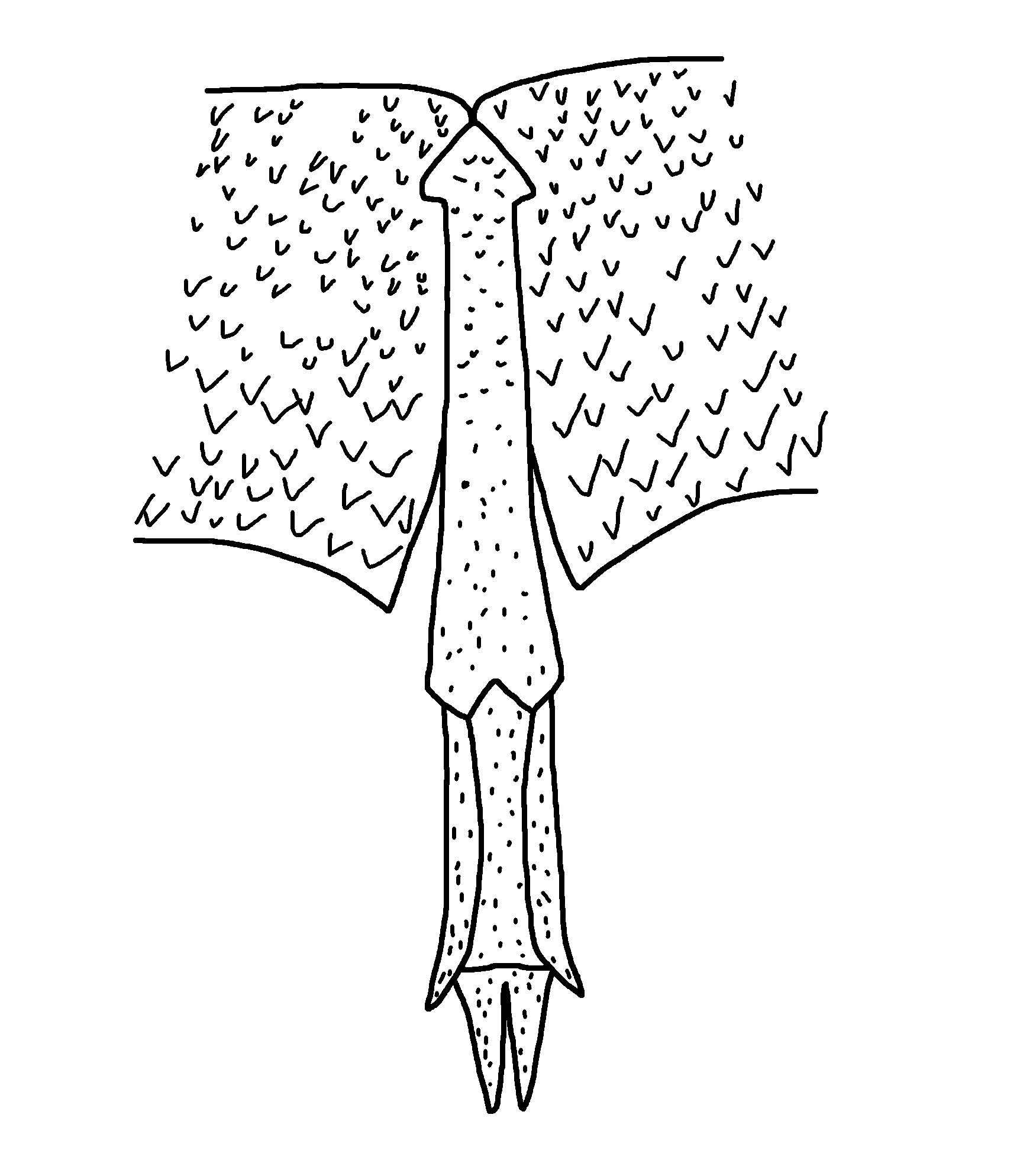
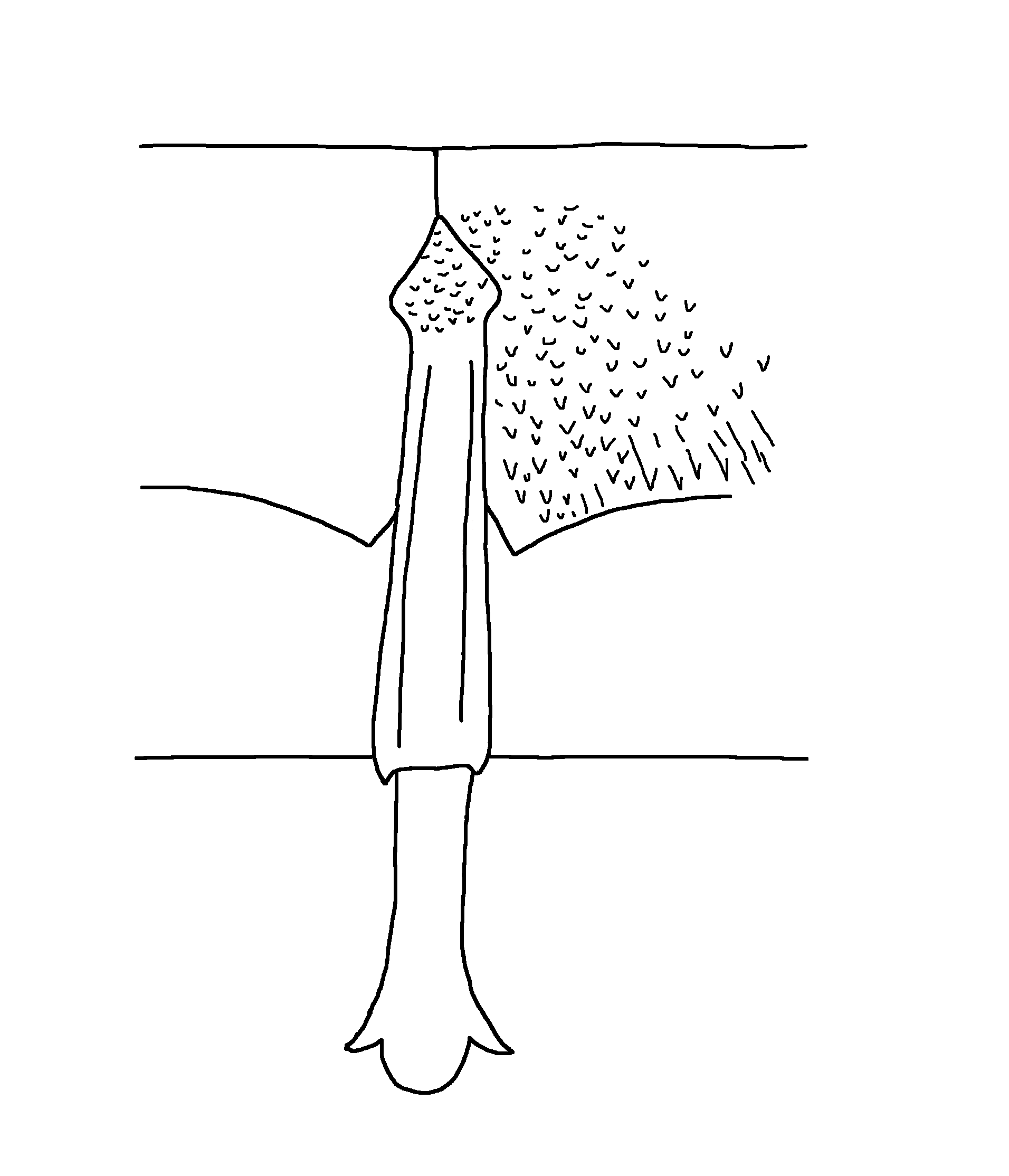
Type A genital appendages of Bassipterus bellistriata (left) and Pittsfordipterus phelpsae (right)

Bassipterus is classified as part of the family Pittsfordipteridae in the superfamily Adelophthalmoidea. It was originally described as a hughmilleriid, but since then it has been considered closer to Adelophthalmus than to Hughmilleria.

Bassipterus and Pittsfordipterus form a basal ("primitive") group that differentiate them from the other adelophthalmoids. This clade is backed by a pair of synapomorphies (shared characteristics different from that of their latest common ancestor); relatively long and narrow eyes and a complex termination of the genital appendage. Therefore, Pittsfordipterus is the sister group (closest relative) of Bassipterus. Bassipterus was also similar to Parahughmilleria, a derived adelophthalmoid whose metastoma, telson and body were slightly differentiated. This has led some authors to synonymize Bassipterus with Parahughmilleria, though this is not currently supported.

The cladogram below follows the phylogenetic analysis of Lamsdell (2025).

- Adelophthalmoidea
  - Nanahughmilleriidae
    - Nanahughmilleria notosiberica
    - - Nanahughmilleria clarkei
      - Nanahughmilleria norvegica
  - - Parahughmilleriidae
      - Pruemopterus salgadoi
      - - Parahughmilleria pygmaea
        - - Parahughmilleria hefteri
          - Parahughmilleria fuea
    - - Pittsfordipteridae
        - Archopterus anjiensis
        - - Bassipterus bellistriata
          - - Pittsfordipterus maria
            - Pittsfordipterus phelpsae
      - Adelophthalmidae
        - Wiedopterus noctua
        - Adelophthalmus
          - - Adelophthalmus sievertsi
            - Adelophthalmus waterstoni
          - - Adelophthalmus luceroensis
            - - Adelophthalmus irinae
              - Adelophthalmus kamyshtensis
            - - Adelophthalmus zadrai
              - - Adelophthalmus imhofi
                - Adelophthalmus wilsoni
              - - Adelophthalmus granosus
                - - Adelophthalmus dumonti
                  - Adelophthalmus moyseyi
              - - Adelophthalmus approximatus
                - - - Adelophthalmus mansfieldi
                    - Adelophthalmus mazonensis
                  - - Adelophthalmus douvillei
                    - Adelophthalmus sellardsi

== Paleoecology ==
Bassipterus fossils have been recovered from Silurian deposits of the Late Ludlow (Ludfordian) and Early Pridoli epochs of the Wills Creek Formation of West Virginia and Maryland, United States. In the Marylander part of the formation, fossils of other eurypterids have been found, such as Eurypterus remipes or Waeringopterus cumberlandicus together with an indeterminate species of the ostracod Leperditia. On the other hand, in the West Virginian section, remains of W. cumberlandicus, Erettopterus exophthalmus, Parahughmilleria bellistriata and Stoermeropterus nodosus have been associated, as well as unclassified brachiopods and bivalves. Bassipterus lived in a lagoonal or restricted shallow subtidal (the area where sunlight reaches the bottom of the ocean) environment. The lithology (description of the physical characteristics of the rocks) of the zone was composed of argillaceous (composed of clay-like materials) limestone and calcareous (containing calcium) shale.

== See also ==
- List of eurypterids
- Timeline of eurypterid research
