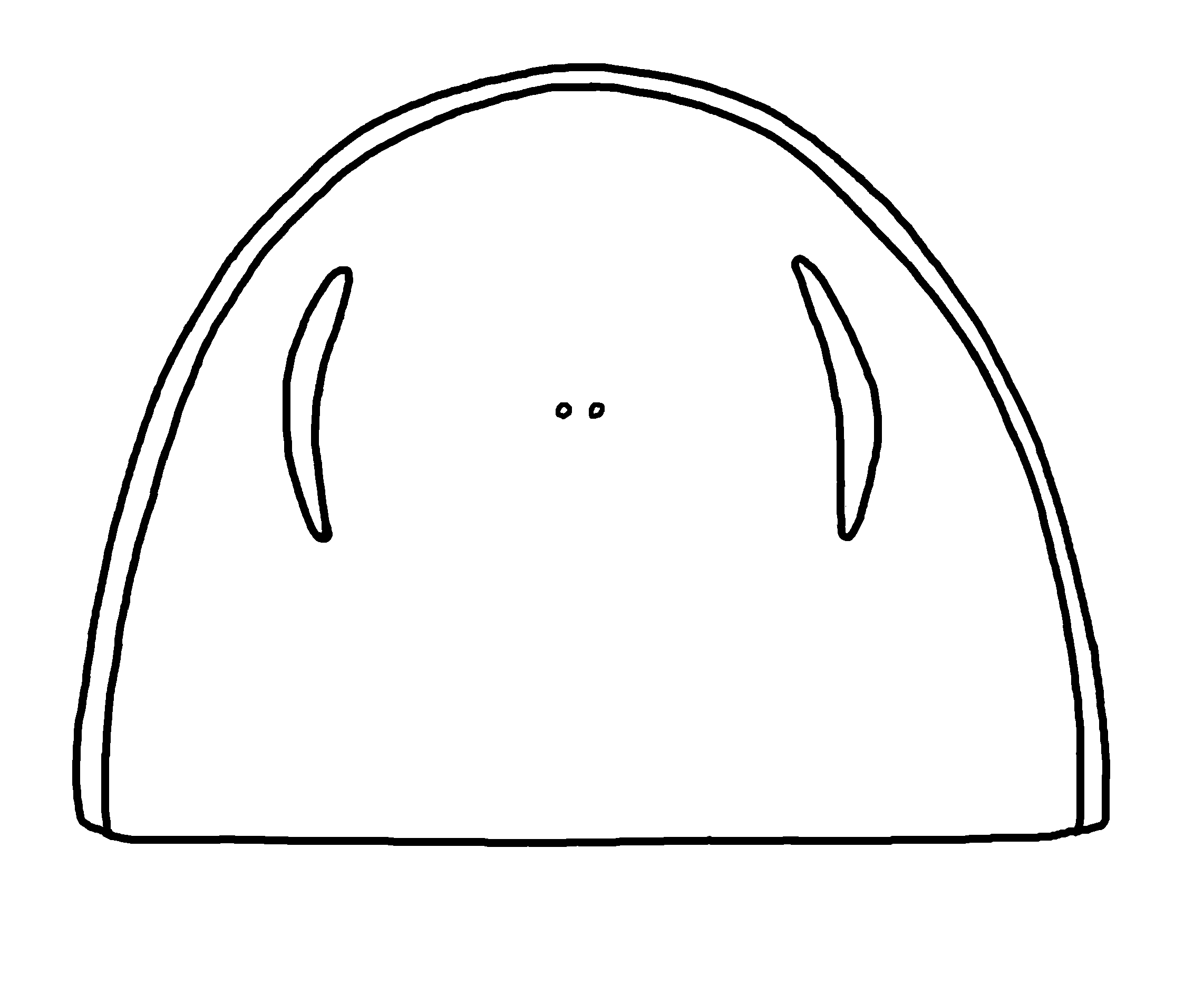
- Restoration of the carapace of P. phelpsae

Scientific classification
- Kingdom: Animalia
- Phylum: Arthropoda
- Subphylum: Chelicerata
- Order: †Eurypterida
- Superfamily: †Adelophthalmoidea
- Family: †Pittsfordipteridae
- Genus: †Pittsfordipterus; Kjellesvig-Waering & Leutze, 1966

Type species
- †Pittsfordipterus phelpsae (Ruedemann, 1921)

Other species
- †P. maria (Clarke, 1907)

= Pittsfordipterus =

Pittsfordipterus Temporal range: Llandovery–Ludlow

Genus of arthropods

Pittsfordipterus ("wing from Pittsford") is a genus of eurypterid, an extinct group of aquatic arthropods. Pittsfordipterus is classified as part of the family Pittsfordipteridae, in the Adelophthalmoidea superfamily of eurypterids. Two species are known, P. phelpsae and P. maria, found in Silurian (Llandovery–Ludlow) deposits in the United States (New York and Pennsylvania).

Pittsfordipterus was a basal ("primitive") genus that was distinguished from more derived adelophthalmoids by the specialization of its genital operculum (a plate-like segment which contains the genital aperture) and its long and narrow eyes, being Bassipterus' closest relative. With an estimated length of 6 cm (2.4 in), Pittsfordipterus phelpsae was one of the smallest adelophthalmoids.

== Description ==
Size comparison of P. phelpsae

Like the other adelophthalmoid eurypterids, Pittsfordipterus was a small eurypterid. The total size of the largest known P. phelpsae specimen is estimated at only 6 cm (2.4 in), making it one of the smallest adelopththalmids and eurypterids overall. P. maria was of a similar size, the largest specimens being 7 cm (2.8 in) long.

Pittsfordipterus had a broad carapace (dorsal shield of the head) with elongated and narrow eyes placed away from the head margin. In the largest specimen (the paratype), the carapace was 18 mm (0.7 in) wide and 13 mm (0.5 in) long. Five parallel lines along the front margin that make up the ornamentation can be seen on the surface of the carapace. In the posterior portion, a series of small irregularly distributed tubercles (rounded protuberances) appear. In the posterior margin, there is a strip of fine triangular scales. The tergites (the dorsal part of the body segments) also present three to four parallel lines along the posterior margin, followed by five lines that end in a series of separate and lunate (crescent-shaped) scales.

Its genital operculum (a plate-like segment which contains the genital aperture) is the main characteristic that distinguishes it from the rest of the derived (more "advanced") adelopththalmids, showing characteristics indicative of the more basal eurypterid Eurypterus. It possessed two opercular flaps, two protruding extensions lateral to the genital appendage. The genital appendage (which is of type A, assumed to represent females) had a great length, extending beyond the second abdominal plate. It was divided into two joints. The first was approximately hastate (with protruding lobes) and was ornamented with fine scales. It was followed by a tubular (tube-shaped) joint that lacked ornamentation. The second joint was less broad and long. The distal end (the farthest from the junction point) widens, with a pair of sharp lateral projections ("protuberances"). This gives it a termination finished in three spines similar to those that occur in the genital appendage (of type A) in Slimonia and Adelophthalmus. The American paleontologist Erik Norman Kjellesvig-Waering predicted that the genital operculum would end up being a feature of great phylogenetic importance at least at the generic level.

== History of research ==
=== P. phelpsae ===
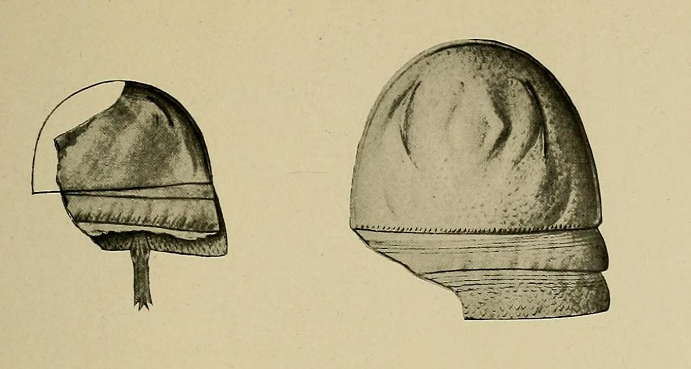
The holotype (right) and paratype (left) of P. phelpsae

Pittsfordipterus phelpsae is only known by two well preserved specimens, the holotype and paratype (NYSM 10102 and NYSM 10103, both at the New York State Museum). In 1921, the American paleontologist Rudolf Ruedemann described the species Hughmilleria phelpsae from the Vernon Formation of the New York state. Ruedemann noted several differences between his new species and H. socialis (type species of Hughmilleria), including the size of the carapace (broader and shorter than in the latter), the position of the eyes further from the margin (as opposed to the marginal position of H. socialis) and the morphology of the genital appendage. Instead, Ruedemann suggested a relationship between H. phelpsae and the species H. shawangunk based on the size of the carapace and the position of the eyes more or less being similar, as well as the same linear ornamentation. However, while in its ventral part, H. shawangunk had the same linear ornamentation, H. phelpsae had imbricate scales similar to those of H. socialis. Even so, he suggested that H. phelpsae could probably represent a late descendant of H. shawangunk.

In the description of the genus Parahughmilleria in 1961, Kjellesvig-Waering suggested that H. phelpsae should be classified under this new genus. Three years later, Kjellesvig-Waering decided to assign the same species to the subgenus Nanahughmilleria. In 1966, Kjellesvig-Waering, together with the American paleontologist Kenneth Edward Caster, recognized that H. (N.) phelpsae was sufficiently different from the other eurypterids and erected the genus Pittsfordipterus based on the morphology of its genital appendage. The name Pittsfordipterus is translated as "wing from Pittsford", with the first word of the name referring to the type locality (the location where it was initially found) and the last word composed of the Greek word πτερόν (pteron, wing).

=== P. maria ===
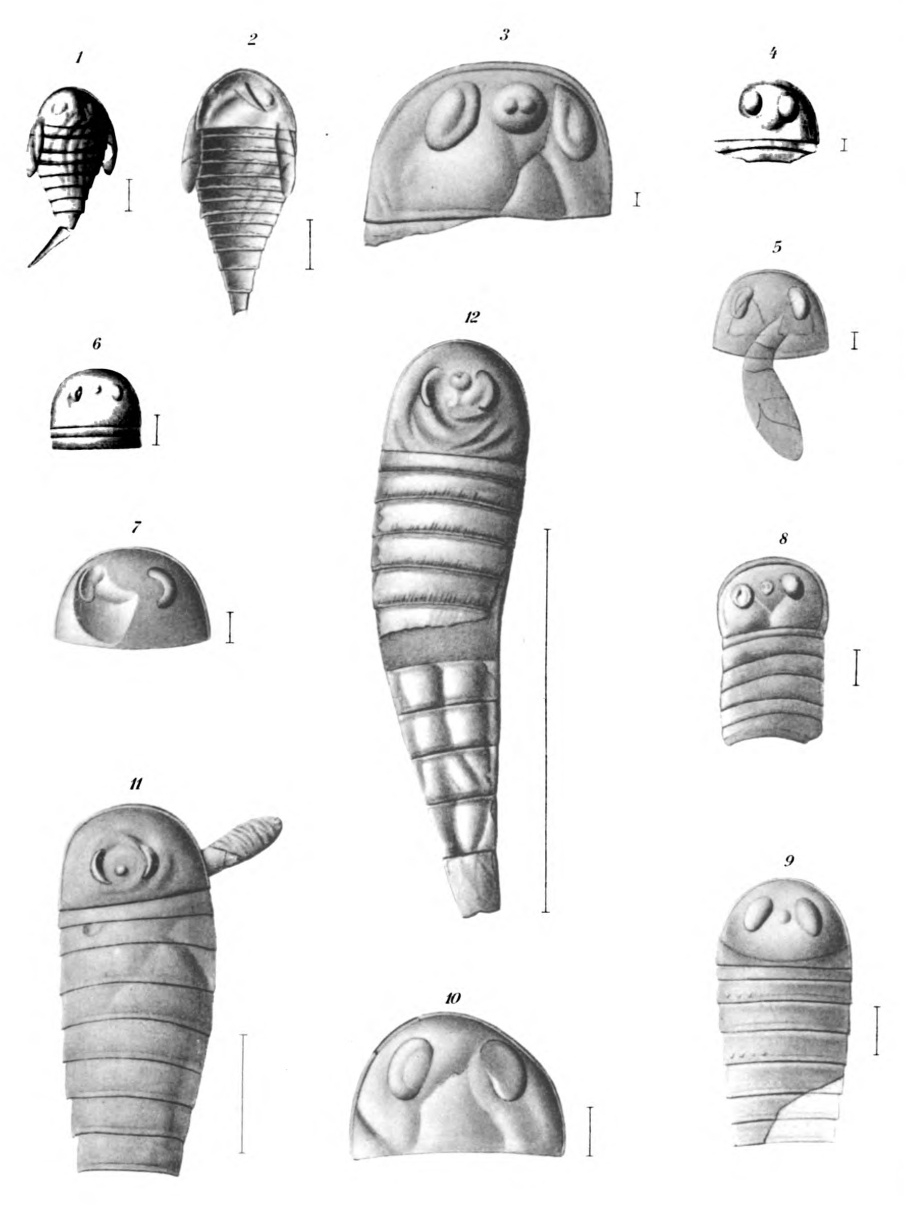
Various fossils of P. maria

In 1907, John Mason Clarke described the eurypterid species Eurypterus maria based on fossils from the Shawangunk Mountains, New York. The carapace of this species was somewhat elongate, regularly rounded and with subparallel (almost parallel) lateral margins with subcentral (near the centre of the carapace) eyes of a crescentic (half moon shaped) form. The segments were wide. A rapid contraction was observed in the postabdomen (segments 8 to 12) reminiscent of the scorpion abdomen, which seems to indicate a nepionic (immature) condition. Similar contraction is present in other immature eurypterids as well. The only known adult eurypterids to possess it are Carcinosoma scorpioides and several species of Eusarcana, in which the tail was heavily specialized. The ocelli (light-sensitive simple eyes) were located in a line that connected the centers of the compound eyes, and were located on a large prominent mound. The abdomen was thin and tapered towards the telson, which was lanceolate. The third and fourth segments were the widest of the preabdomen. Each tergite of the preadomen was arched with a narrow flat strip (the epimera). In this species, the appendages are rare, and only swimming legs have been found in some mature specimens. These were short and protuberant. The eighth segment or paddle was long and elliptical, with a ninth segment forming a terminal claw.

In 1961, Erik N. Kjellesvig-Waering reclassified E. maria to the then new genus Parahughmilleria. P. maria was then not subject to any detailed analysis or examination for decades, merely appearing in the literature through being listed in taxonomic lists. P. maria was referred to Pittsfordipterus by James Lamsdell in 2025. This reassignment was based on the lateral eyes being elongated in several specimens. The lack of serrated edges on the paddle of the sixth appendage allowed Lamsdell to classify the species in Pittsfordipterus rather than the closely related Bassipterus.

== Classification ==
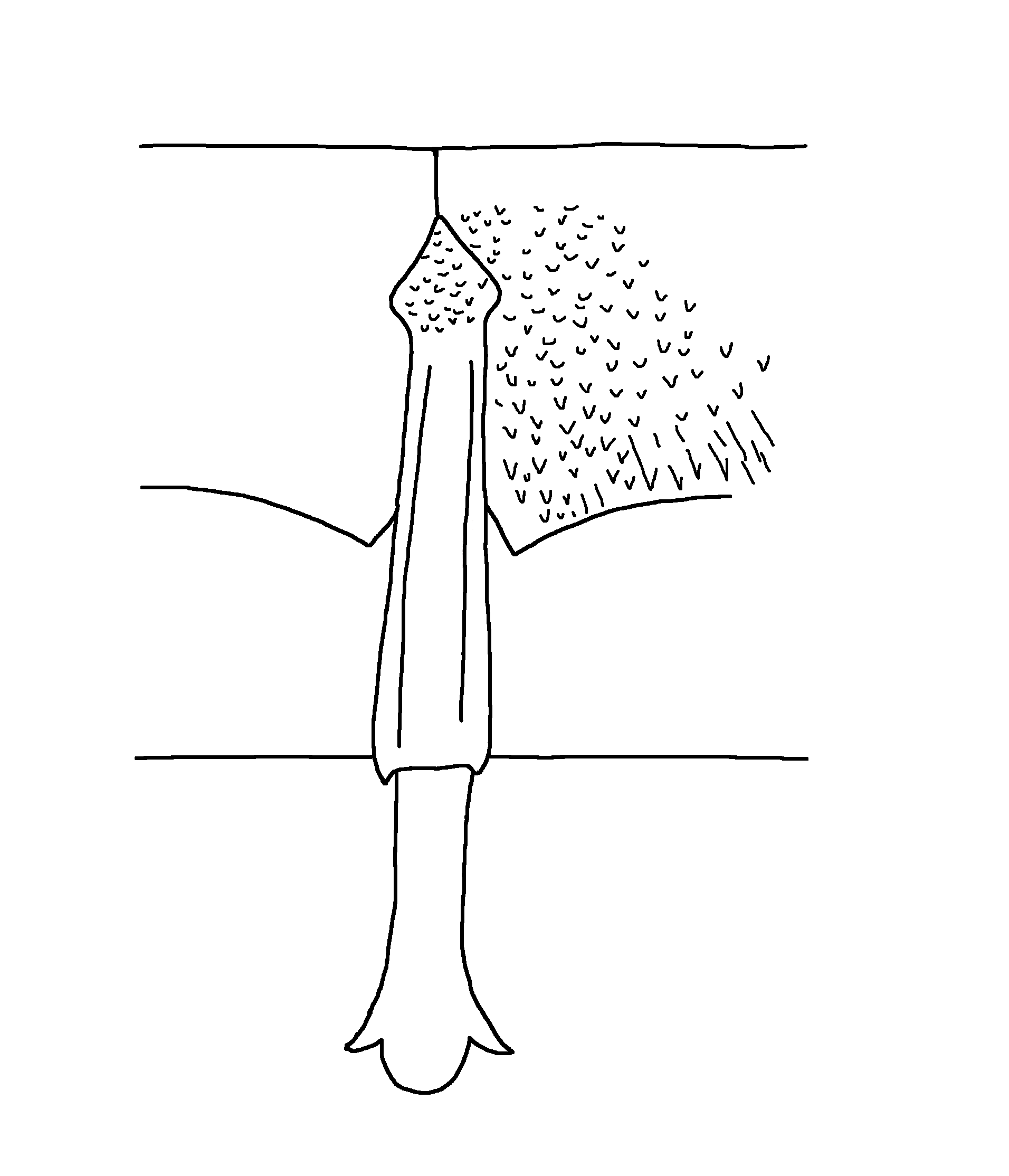
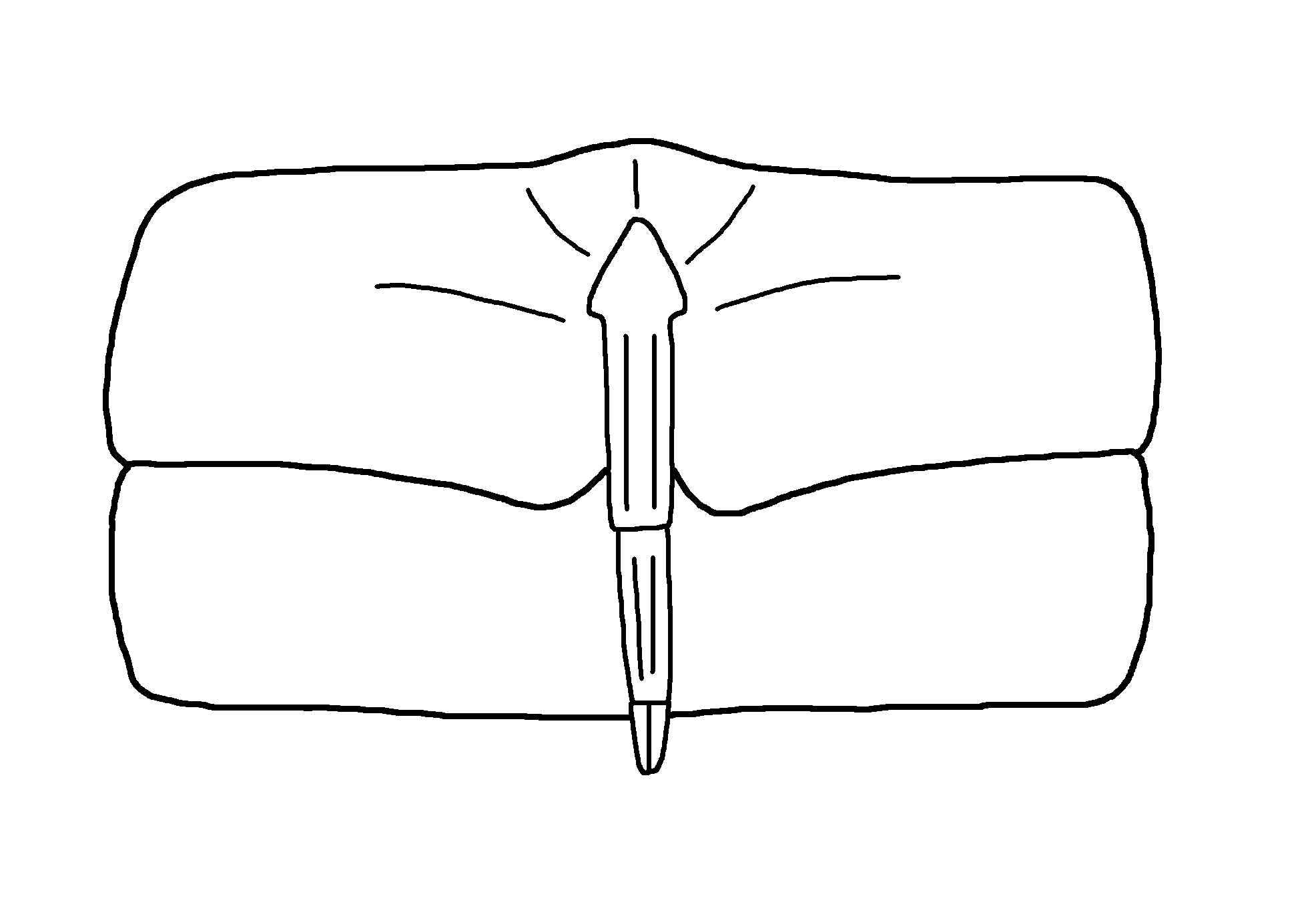
Type A genital appendages of Pittsfordipterus phelpsae (top) and the closely related Nanahughmilleria norvegica (bottom)

Pittsfordipterus is classified as part of the family Pittsfordipteridae, in the Adelophthalmoidea superfamily of eurypterids. P. phelpsae was originally described as a species of the genus Hughmilleria, but it was considered different enough to represent a new separate genus in 1966.

In 2004, O. Erik Tetlie erected the family Nanahughmilleridae in an unpublished thesis to contain the adelophthalmoids with no or reduced genital spatulae (a long, flat piece in the operculum) and the second to fifth pair of prosomal (of the prosoma, "head") appendages (limbs) of Hughmilleria-type (hypothetical since the appendages of Pittsfordipterus are unknown). This family contained Nanahughmileria, Pittsfordipterus and perhaps Parahughmilleria. Later studies tended to classify these nanahughmillerids as part of Adelophthalmidae. In 2025, James Lamsdell classified Pittsfordipterus in its own family in the Adelophthalmoidea, Pittsfordipteridae, alongside Archopterus and Bassipterus.

The cladogram below follows the phylogenetic analysis of Lamsdell (2025).

- Adelophthalmoidea
  - Nanahughmilleriidae
    - Nanahughmilleria notosiberica
    - - Nanahughmilleria clarkei
      - Nanahughmilleria norvegica
  - - Parahughmilleriidae
      - Pruemopterus salgadoi
      - - Parahughmilleria pygmaea
        - - Parahughmilleria hefteri
          - Parahughmilleria fuea
    - - Pittsfordipteridae
        - Archopterus anjiensis
        - - Bassipterus bellistriata
          - - Pittsfordipterus maria
            - Pittsfordipterus phelpsae
      - Adelophthalmidae
        - Wiedopterus noctua
        - Adelophthalmus
          - - Adelophthalmus sievertsi
            - Adelophthalmus waterstoni
          - - Adelophthalmus luceroensis
            - - Adelophthalmus irinae
              - Adelophthalmus kamyshtensis
            - - Adelophthalmus zadrai
              - - Adelophthalmus imhofi
                - Adelophthalmus wilsoni
              - - Adelophthalmus granosus
                - - Adelophthalmus dumonti
                  - Adelophthalmus moyseyi
              - - Adelophthalmus approximatus
                - - - Adelophthalmus mansfieldi
                    - Adelophthalmus mazonensis
                  - - Adelophthalmus douvillei
                    - Adelophthalmus sellardsi

== Paleoecology ==
Pittsfordipterus fossils have been recovered from Silurian deposits of the Late Ludlow (Ludfordian) epoch of the Vernon Formation of the New York state. In this formation, fossils of other eurypterids have been found, such as Eurypterus pittsfordensis or Mixopterus multispinosus, as well as indeterminate species of phyllocarids, leperditiids and cephalopods. The lithology of the place consists of dark gray to black shale with abundant gypsum and dolomite slabs that reach a combined thickness of 305 m (1,000 ft). It is also possible to find green shale and very rarely, red shale. This habitat was probably lagoonal.

== See also ==
- List of eurypterid genera
- Timeline of eurypterid research
