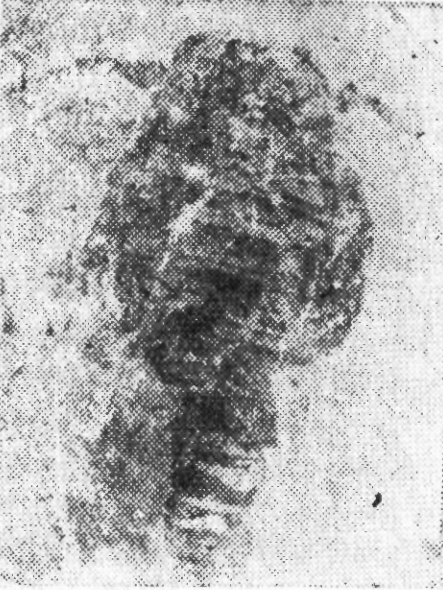
- Type and only known specimen of U. anastasiae
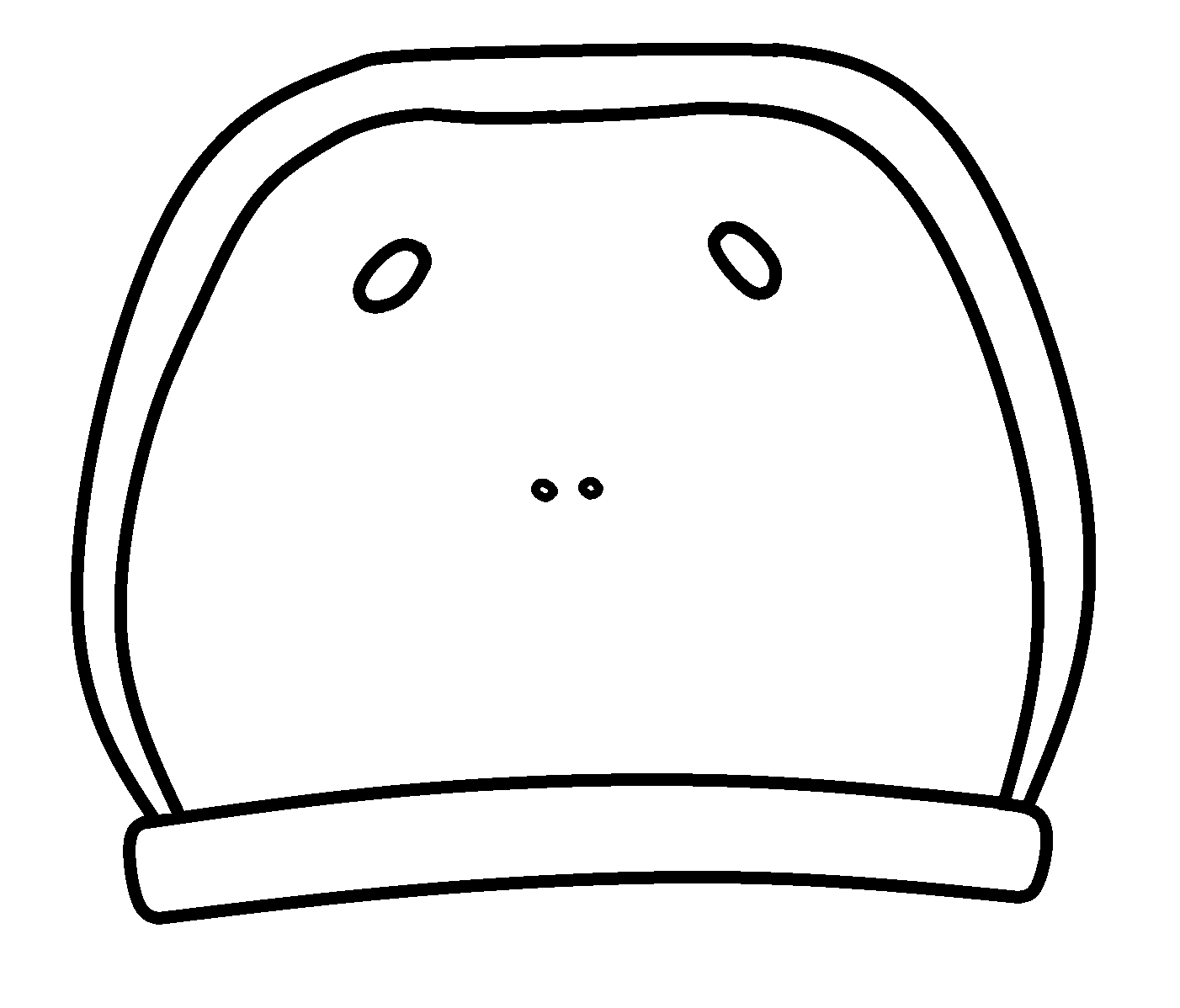
- Restoration of the carapace and first body segment of U. anastasiae

Scientific classification
- Kingdom: Animalia
- Phylum: Arthropoda
- Subphylum: Chelicerata
- Order: †Eurypterida
- Superfamily: †Adelophthalmoidea
- Family: †Adelophthalmidae
- Genus: †Unionopterus; Chernyshev, 1948

Type species
- †Unionopterus anastasiae Chernyshev, 1948

= Unionopterus =

Unionopterus Temporal range: Tournaisian-Viséan, 358.9–330.9 Ma

Genus of eurypterid

Unionopterus is a genus of eurypterid, an extinct group of aquatic arthropods commonly known as "sea scorpions". Fossils have been registered from the Early Carboniferous period. The genus contains only one species, U. anastasiae, recovered from deposits of Tournaisian to Viséan stages in Kazakhstan. Known from one single specimen (now presumed to be lost) which was described in a publication of Russian language with poor illustrations, Unionopterus' affinities are extremely poorly known.

Unionopterus was described in 1948 after the discovery of its only known specimen in the Karaganda Formation of Kazakhstan (at that time part of the Soviet Union). This was one of the first discoveries of eurypterids in the Soviet Union and Carboniferous eurypterids in general. It was probably a swimming organism as well as other eurypterids, although not as good as its relatives.

There are numerous factors that have made Unionopterus a problematic genus for eurypterid researchers. It has been placed in the family Adelophthalmidae and it has even been speculated that a species of Adelophthalmus, A. dumonti, actually belongs to Unionopterus, but this cannot be confirmed. Many authors have chosen to completely ignore the genus during phylogenetic studies, making Unionopterus an enigmatic eurypterid.

== Description ==
Unionopterus was a very small eurypterid, with the length of the body being estimated at 2.38 cm (0.9 in), although this measure excludes unknown parts of the body (like the 12th body segment or the tail). Unionopterus was far smaller than the largest adelophthalmids, such as Adelophthalmus khakassicus of 32 cm (12.6 in) in length.

The morphology of Unionopterus is relatively well known since its only known specimen is almost completely preserved. The prosoma ("head") was trapezoid and somewhat narrow anteriorly, being close to that of Eurypterus. It was surrounded by a wide marginal border. The lateral eyes were small (about 1.5 millimetres or 0.06 inches long), reniform (bean-shaped) and close to the prosoma, resembling Nanahughmilleria. The ocelli (simple eye-like sensory organs) occupied a subcentral (almost central) position, immediately behind the eyes. Also known is the metastoma (a large plate that is part of the abdomen), which extended to the second segment, probably shifted downwards. As in the rest of eurypterids, the opisthosoma was divided into twelve segments. The tergites (dorsal half of the segment) of the mesosoma (comprising segments 1 to 6) were rigid and covered with chitin. The first opisthosomal segment was twice as short as the rest, and the fourth was the widest. From this segment, the opisthosoma would begin to narrow gradually. The seventh segment carried two lateral extensions, known as epimera, and was separated from the other five by a weakly expressed groove. The pretelson (12th segment anterior to the telson) and telson (the posteriormost division of the body) are not known, but due to the opisthosoma structure, the telson was probably similar to the one of Hughmilleria (styliform and lanceolate). The metasoma (compromising segments 7 to 12) had an ornamentation that consisted of small and frequent scales grouped in rows that overlapped each other, a system of ornamentation common among the genera of Adelophthalmidae.

Only four out of the six pairs of appendages are known. In the second pair, the eighth podomere (leg segment) had the appearance of a thin spine (1.01 mm or 0.03 in long), while the seventh, sixth and fifth only differed slightly in thickness and length. According to weak traces, they all possessed spines in their distal ends, which were probably preserved in a different position than during their lifetime's. The rest of the podomeres were hidden under the prosoma, and therefore they are not known. The third pair was more or less similar to the second one, but thicker and longer than the latter, with different proportions and spikes in the podomeres. Few fragments are known from the fourth pair, while the fifth pair is not known at all. In the sixth pair of appendages, also known as swimming legs, the seventh podomere was long and very expanded towards the end, the eighth was elliptical and large, but not as much as the previous one. In a shallow groove located on the inner side of the eighth podomere was the ninth one in the form of a small spine. These podomeres form the paddle of the swimming leg. Parts of the coxae (the point of union with the prosoma and the appendages) are known, but all are poorly preserved and in a unnatural position, as well as potential remains of chelicerae (first pair of appendages).

== History of research ==
Location of Karaganda in Kazakhstan, where the only known specimen of Unionopterus has been found

Unionopterus is only known by an almost complete fossil from the Karaganda Formation, Karaganda, Kazakhstan (then part of the Soviet Union). The fossil was deposited in a coal seam, and was collected from a borehole. Unionopterus represented the only eurypterid (and merostomate, an outdated group that encompassed eurypterids and xiphosurans) of the entire Soviet Union after Adelophthalmus carbonarius. This specimen was collected by the Russian geologist Leonty Leontiyevich Halfin and sent to the Ukrainian paleontologist Boris Isidorovich Chernyshev, who described it in 1948 and also described A. carbonarius in 1933. Due to its temporal rank (Lower Carboniferous, one of the first finds from this period), Chernyshev considered the genus as worthwhile for the knowledge of Eurypterida and its evolution, placing it in the family Pterygotidae. He gave it the specific epithet anastasiae to honour his wife, who helped him during the study of Unionopterus.

Unionopterus has been considered as an enigmatic genus whose classification is highly uncertain. Because its only known specimen is probably lost and the original description by Chernyshev was not well-illustrated and in Russian, its re-study is impossible. Unionopterus has been considered as a genus close to Adelophthalmus, as incertae sedis in the whole Eurypterida order or directly ignored by eurypterid researchers. Victor P. Tollerton, Jr. considered Unionopterus as part of his new family Adelophthalmidae, and placed the genus in it in 1989 based in the possession of spines in its appendages and their similar appearance with those of Adelophthalmus, with which some authors agree. If this was the case, Unionopterus would represent not only the only post-Devonian form of the family Adelophthalmidae, but of the whole suborder Eurypterina (swimming eurypterids) along with Adelophthalmus itself.

Further, in 2005 the paleontologists Odd Erik Tetlie and Jason A. Dunlop suggested that the Belgian species Adelophthalmus dumonti could actually represent a species of Unionopterus due to similarities in the trapezoidal shape of the prosoma and the width of the marginal rim. However, this was contested by Tetlie and Peter Van Roy a year later, following the re-analysis of a specimen of A. dumonti which showed that its carapace in fact had a parabolic (approximately U-shaped) shape and a narrow marginal rim, unlike that shown in its original description in 1917.

== Classification ==
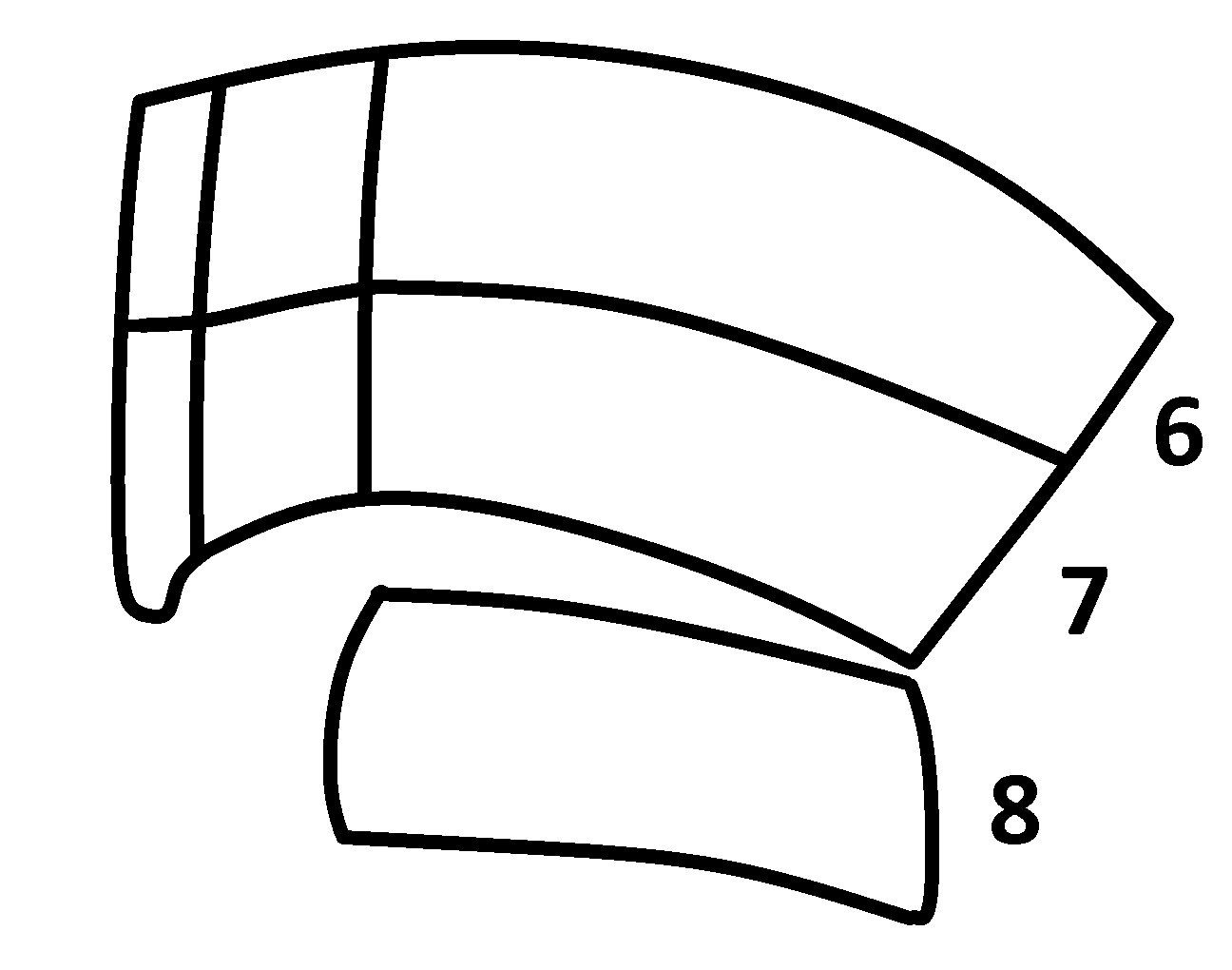
Sixth to eight body segments of Unionopterus

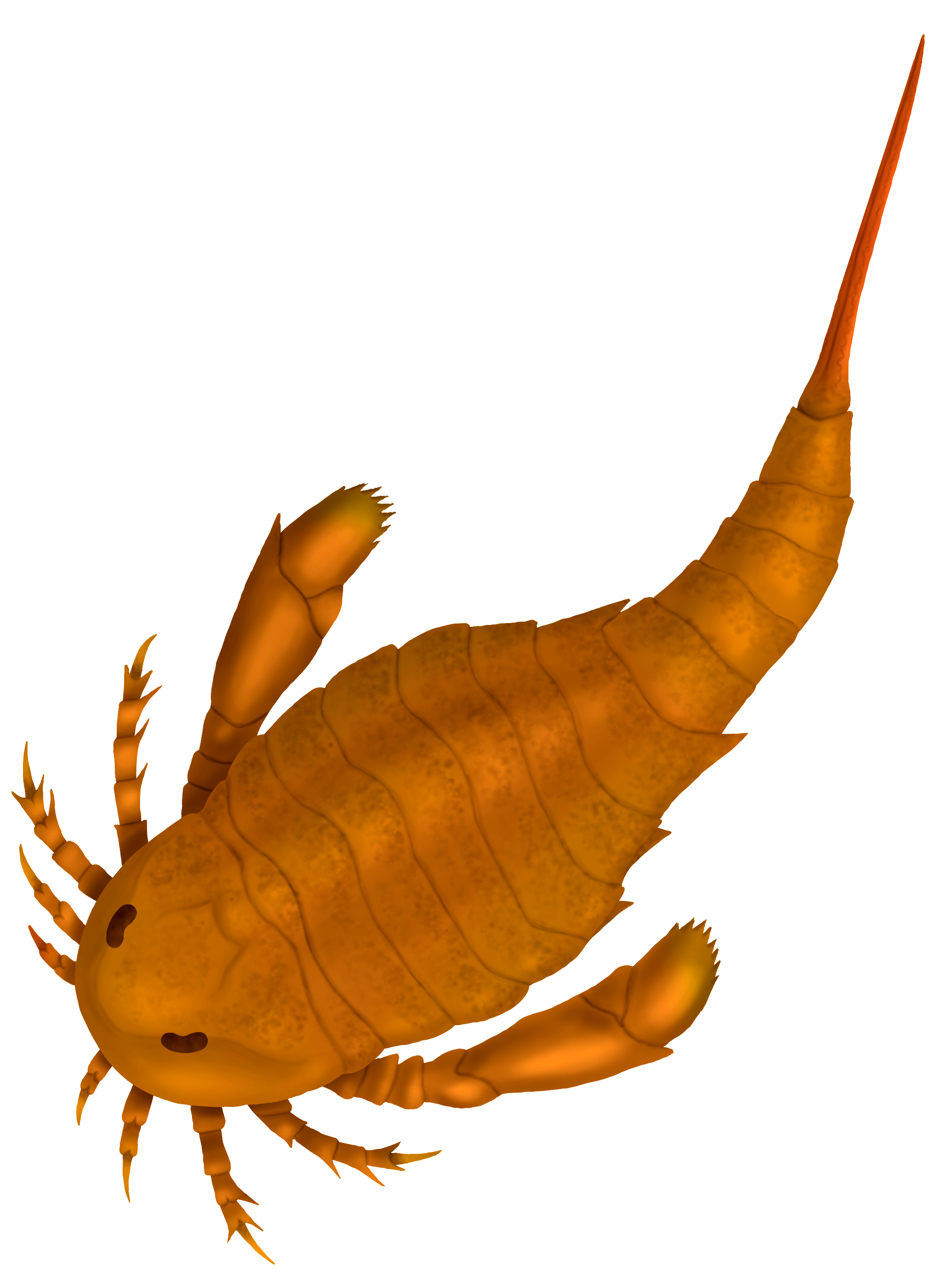
Restoration of the possibly related Adelophthalmus

Chernyshev classified Unionopterus as a member of the family Pterygotidae, mainly due to its great similarities to Hughmilleria (genus which he thought should have a separate clade), such as the prosoma and opisthosoma shape, position of the eyes, aerodynamic body, epimera, gradual narrowing of the body and shape of the swimming leg, among others. Victor P. Tollerton, Jr. would classify it in 1989 in the family Adelophthalmidae, but some later authors consider this classification uncertain.

The phylogenetic classification of Unionopterus is not clear due to the poor illustrations given by Chernyshev and the probable loss of the only known specimen of Unionopterus. There are several factors that help the inclusion of the genus in Adelophthalmidae, such as the possession of spines in the appendage or epimeras in the metasoma, but the trapezoidal shape of the prosoma is different from all adelophthalmids. In addition, the affinities within Adelophthalmidae of Unionopterus are also uncertain, as it seems to share characteristics with Adelophthalmus but also with the more basal ("primitive") Nanahughmilleria and Pittsfordipterus. It has also been suggested that the fossil described by Chernyshev in fact represents another specimen of Adelophthalmus whose characteristics have been misinterpreted, but since the location of the fossil is still unknown, it is possible that this will never be resolved.

The following cladogram is based on a larger phylogenetic analysis carried out by Tetlie (2004) in an unpublished thesis encompassing every more or less well known eurypterid genus. It has been simplified to only show Adelophthalmoidea and the closely related Pterygotoidea, with Carcinosomatoidea and the waeringopteroids as outgroup taxa (used as reference groups).

- Diploperculata
  - Carcinosomatoidea
  - - Waeringopteroidea
    - - Adelophthalmoidea
        - Parahughmilleria
        - Nanahughmilleria
        - - Unionopterus
          - Adelophthalmus
      - Pterygotoidea
        - Hughmilleria
        - - Herefordopterus
          - - Slimonia
            - - Jaekelopterus
              - - - Pterygotus
                  - Erettopterus
                - Acutiramus

Unionopterus was likewise classified in Adelophthalmidae by Lamsdell (2025).

== Paleoecology ==
Like other forms with a similar body structure, it is likely that Unionopterus was a benthic (living at the lowest level of the waterbody) organism. Its body and lifestyle were capable of and adapted to not only swimming, but also crawling. However, Unionopterus would not have been so active as other relatives.

== See also ==
- List of eurypterid genera
- Timeline of eurypterid research
