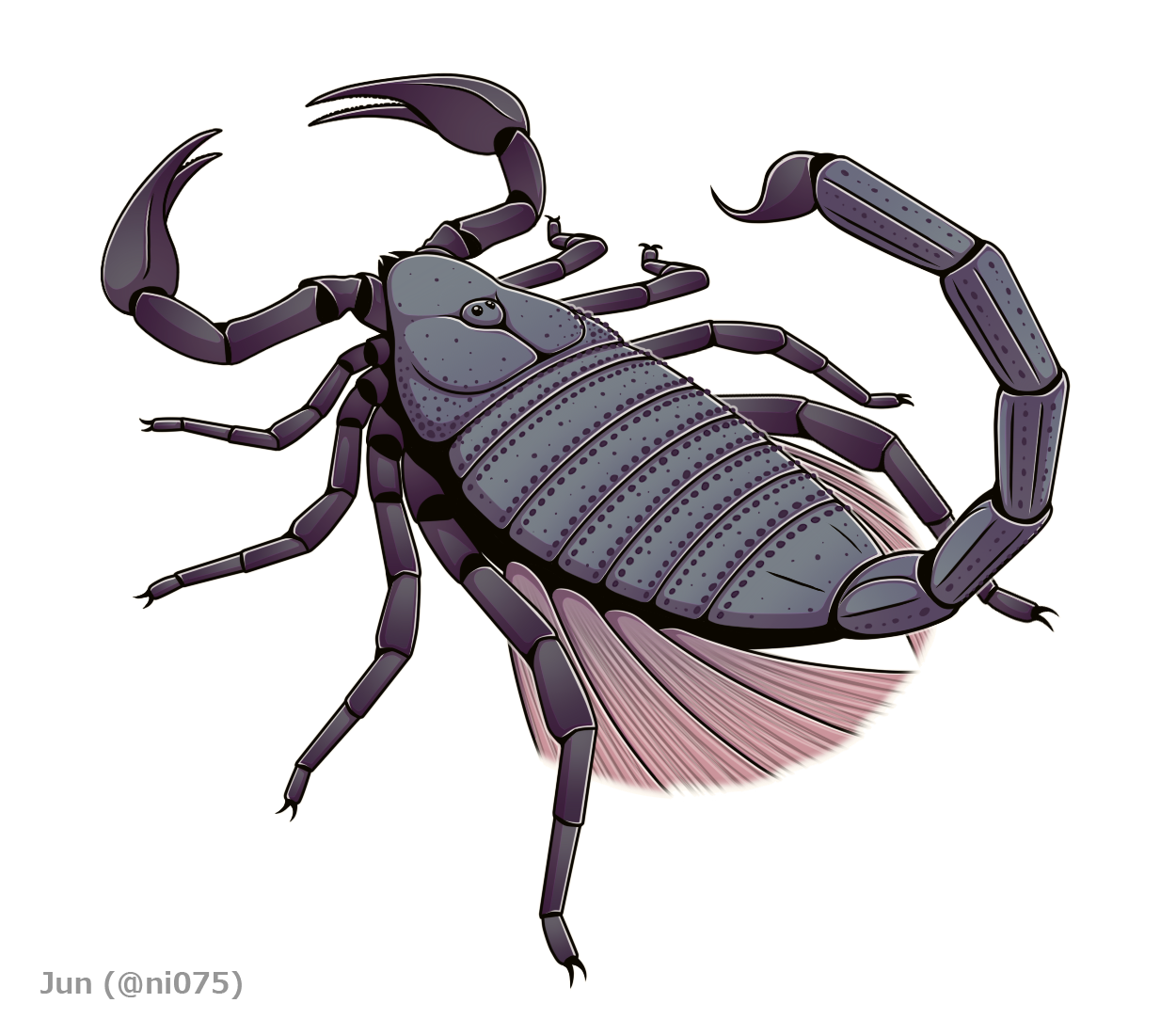
- Life restoration of W. westerwaldensis
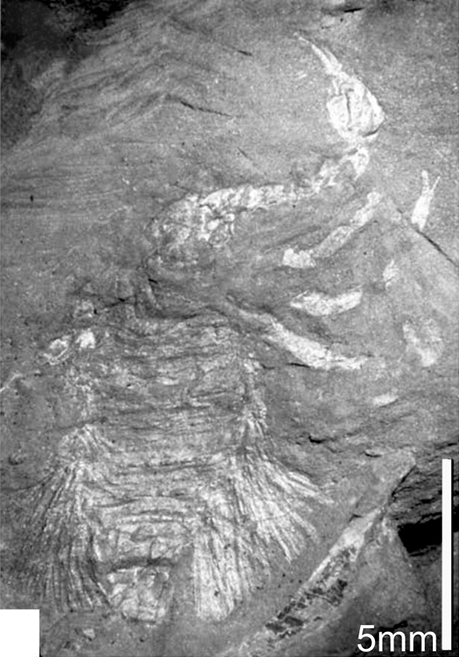
- Type specimen of W. westerwaldensis

Scientific classification
- Kingdom: Animalia
- Phylum: Arthropoda
- Subphylum: Chelicerata
- Class: Arachnida
- Order: Scorpiones
- Family: †Proscorpiidae
- Genus: †Waeringoscorpio; Størmer, 1970

Type species
- Waeringoscorpio hefteri Størmer, 1970

= Waeringoscorpio =

Waeringoscorpio Temporal range: 411–408 Ma

Genus of fossil scorpions

Waeringoscorpio is a fossil genus of scorpions in the family Proscorpiidae. Species of this genus were discovered in Germany and lived during the Devonian period (411–408 Ma). Waeringoscorpio is the only known genus of scorpion to show gill-like features.

== List of species ==
There are two accepted species:

- † Waeringoscorpio hefteri Størmer, 1970
- † Waeringoscorpio westerwaldensis Poschmann, Dunlop, Kamenz & Scholtz, 2008
