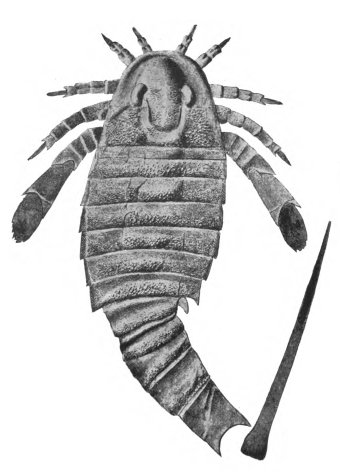
- Fossil of Adelophthalmus mansfieldi.

Scientific classification
- Kingdom: Animalia
- Phylum: Arthropoda
- Subphylum: Chelicerata
- Order: †Eurypterida
- Suborder: †Eurypterina
- Infraorder: †Diploperculata
- Superfamily: †Adelophthalmoidea; Tollerton, 1989

Type species
- †Adelophthalmus granosus Jordan in Jordan & von Meyer, 1854

Genera
- †Adelophthalmidae; †Adelophthalmus; †Selkiepterella; †Unionopterus; †Wiedopterus; †Nanahughmilleriidae; †Nanahughmilleria; †Parahughmilleriidae; †Parahughmilleria; †Pruemopterus; †Pittsfordipteridae; †Archopterus; †Bassipterus; †Pittsfordipterus

= Adelophthalmoidea =

Adelophthalmoidea Temporal range: Late Ordovician-Artinskian, 455–283.5 Ma

Family of eurypterids

Adelophthalmoidea (the name deriving from the type genus Adelophthalmus, meaning "no obvious eyes") is a superfamily of eurypterids, an extinct group of aquatic arthropods. Adelophthalmoidea is classified within the infraorder Diploperculata, in the suborder Eurypterina. The superfamily contains four families: Adelophthalmidae, Nanahughmilleriidae, Parahughmilleriidae, and Pittsfordipteridae.

Adelophthalmoid eurypterids were small and swimming eurypterids that appeared in the Silurian period. With the earliest known members of the group, Nanahughmilleria prominens and Parahughmilleria maria, being known from deposits of Early Silurian (possibly the Llandovery epoch) age and the last members, belonging to the long-lasting and widespread genus Adelophthalmus, going extinct in the Early Permian, the Adelophthalmidae is the longest lasting single family of eurypterids. The survival of the group, and of swimming eurypterids (the suborder Eurypterina) beyond the Late Devonian is entirely due to the survival, and subsequent success, of Adelophthalmus throughout the Devonian and Carboniferous. Adelophthalmus (and possibly Unionopterus) represents the only known genus of swimming eurypterids beyond the extinction of the rest of the group in the Late Devonian, extending the temporal range of the group by over a hundred million years.

Though the last swimming eurypterids and the final members of the traditionally more successful and numerous suborder Eurypterina, the adelophthalmoids were not the last eurypterids. The stylonurines or the "walking eurypterids" were the last ones, surviving in the family Hibbertopteridae until the Permian–Triassic extinction event or shortly before a few million years after the extinction of the adelophthalmoids in the Early Permian.

== Description ==
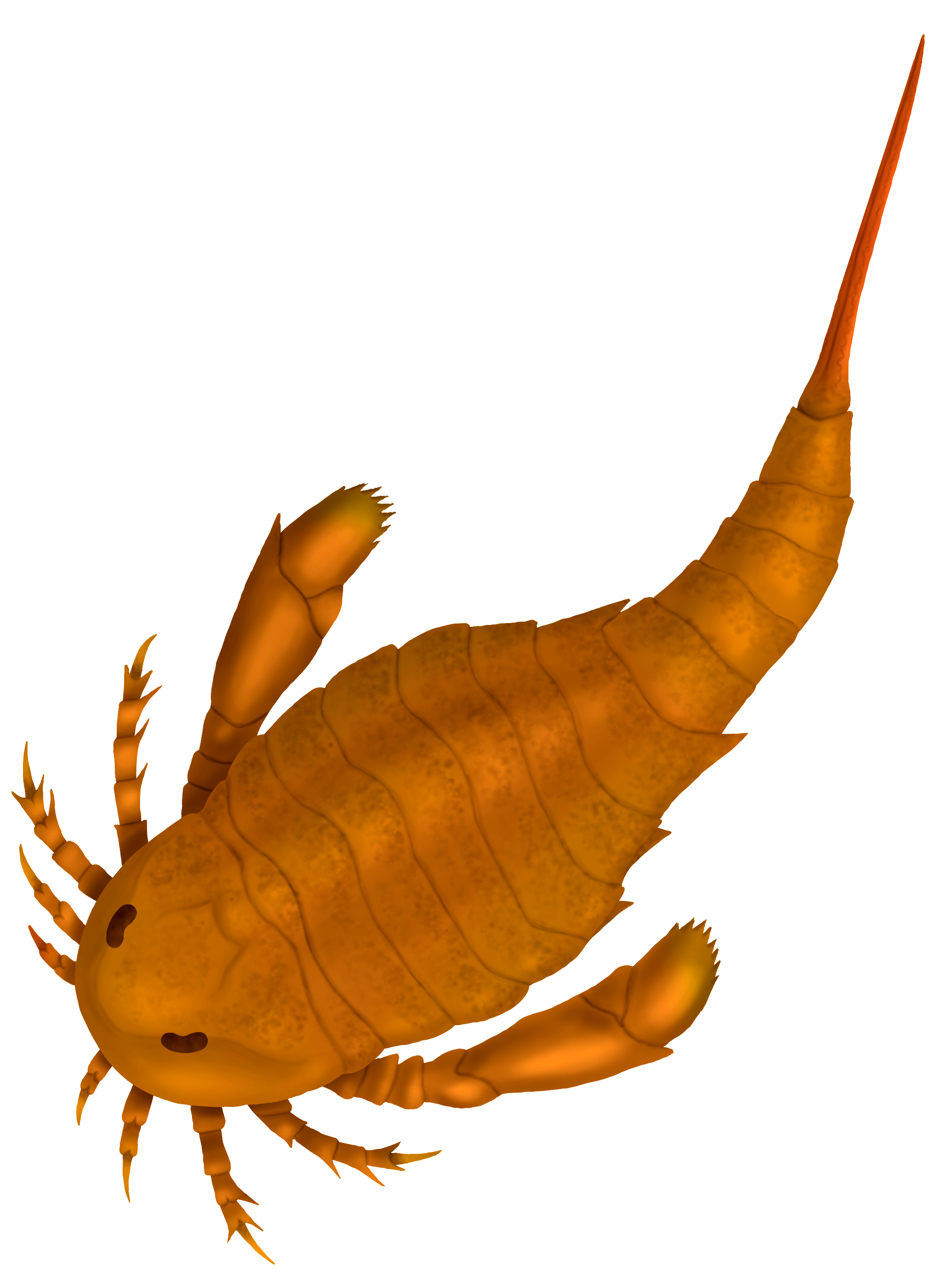
Reconstruction of Adelophthalmus irinae.

The size of the adelophthalmoid eurypterids ranged from 4 centimetres (1.6 inch) to 32 cm (12.6 in), the smallest species being Nanahughmilleria clarkei and the largest one being Adelophthalmus khakassicus. The adelophthalmoids were relatively small compared to their relatives, such as the gigantic pterygotid Jaekelopterus rhenaniae, which easily exceeded 2 metres (6.5 feet), and was the largest arthropod ever discovered.

The adelophthalmoids were small swimming eurypterids with a parabolic (approximately U-shaped) carapace (the dorsal plate of the head, Unionopterus possibly representing an exception) and with intramarginal (occurring within the margin) eyes. The swimming leg (sixth limb) was of Adelophthalmus-type, that is, with a seventh podomere (segments of the limbs) long and an eighth podomere coarsely serrated. The body had a midsection second order differentiation present (that is, with lateral "extensions" in the seventh body segment) and with a lanceolate (lance-shaped) telson (the posteriormost division of the body).

The morphology of the group varies depending on how derived (evolutionary advanced) the genus was. In fact, from the basal ("primitive") Nanahughmilleria to the more derived Adelophthalmus, a gradual decrease in the spinosity (possessing spines) of the appendages (limbs) and an increase in the size of the genital spatulae (a long, flat piece in the genital area) occurred. The even more primitive Pittsfordipterus probably did not even possess the latter.

== History of research ==
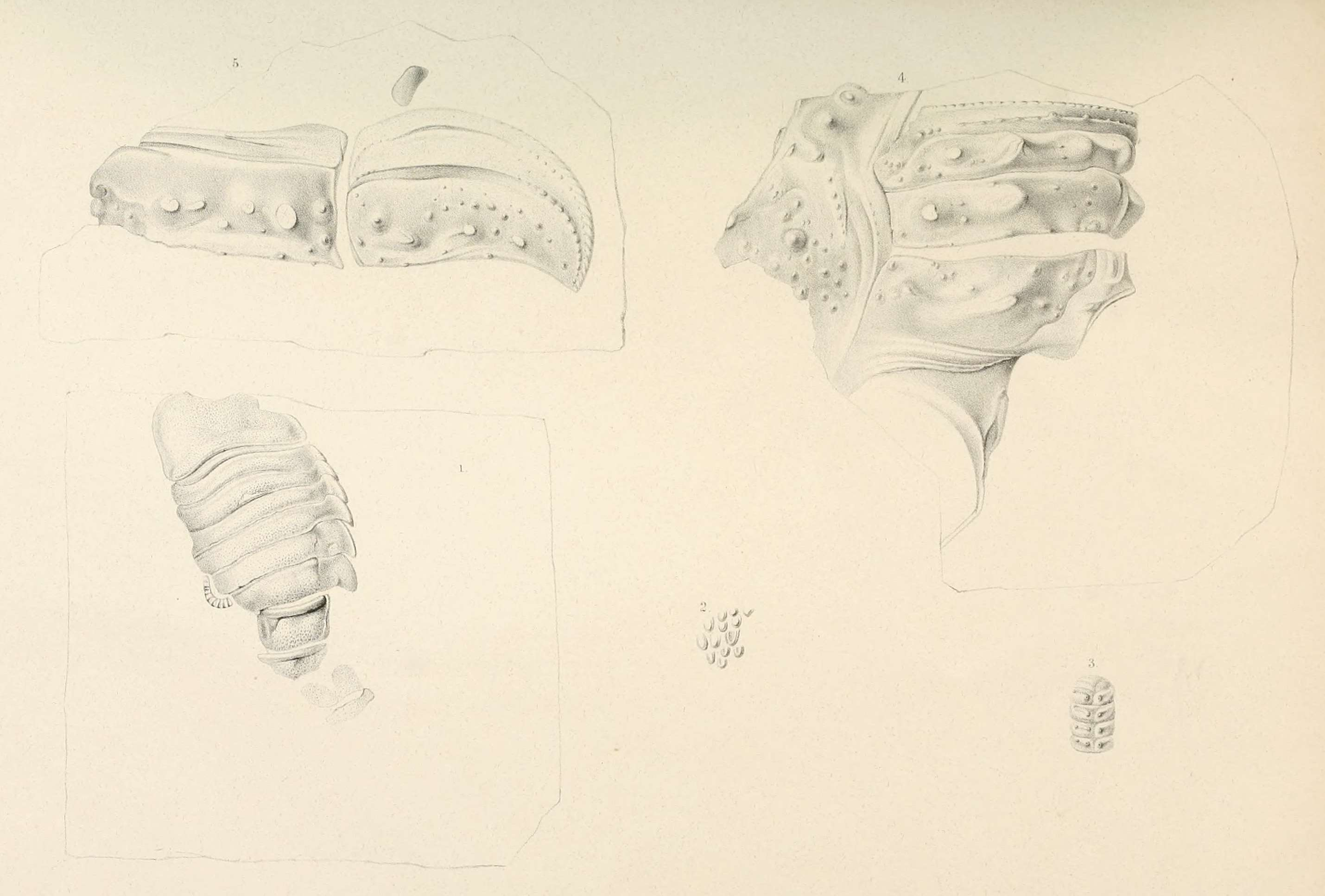
The type specimen of Adelophthalmus granosus, the first adelophthalmid ever described.

The first adelophthalmoid fossils to be uncovered were those of the type genus, Adelophthalmus. The German paleontologist Hermann Jordan collected the first specimen of the species A. granosus at Jägersfreude in Saarland, Germany. The specimen would be described three years later by Jordan and Hermann von Meyer, who immediately recognized the eurypterid nature of the fossils by the great resemblance of the overall shape and form of the carapace and appendages with that of Eurypterus. One of the main differences that Jordan and von Meyer noticed was the apparent lack of eyes, which gives name to Adelophthalmus (meaning "no obvious eyes") and the entire superfamily. This feature is now assumed to be due to a preservational artifact and that was not present in Adelophthalmus, nor in any other adelophthalmoid. Since then, a total of 33 species have been described, some of which have been historically classified within other genera (Anthraconectes, Glyptoscorpius, Lepidoderma and Polyzosternites, all now synonymous with Adelophthalmus), making Adelophthalmus the most diverse eurypterid genus to date. However, many of these species are fragmentary and could represent synonyms of other species within Adelophthalmus or even species of other genera. It is possible that the large amount of species in Adelophthalmus will eventually provoke its separation into two or three separate genera.

In 1948, the Ukrainian paleontologist and geologist Boris Isidorovich Chernyshev described a new genus known by one single specimen from Kazakhstan (at that time part of the Soviet Union) and tentatively classified it as part of the Pterygotidae family. It was named Unionopterus, and its classification is controversial due to the poor illustrations given by Chernyshev and the fact that the only known fossil is presumed to be lost. The genus has been treated as an indeterminate eurypterid, an adelophthalmoid or a member of the genus Adelophthalmus, as well as completely ignored. The spinosity of its appendages may suggest the second option, but this is not entirely certain and the phylogenetic classification of Unionopterus may never be resolved.

In 1961, the American paleontologist Erik Norman Kjellesvig-Waering considered several species of the genus Hughmilleria sufficiently different from the type species to be separated into a new subgenus, which he named Nanahughmilleria. These species shared a key characteristic, small intramarginal eyes of reniform form (bean-shaped), in contrast to the large ovoid eyes placed in the margin of the carapace present in the genotype and its allied forms. Kjellesvig-Waering designated H. (Nanahughmilleria) norvegica as the type species of the new subgenus. At the same time, he erected a new genus, Parahughmilleria, with P. salteri as the type species. Kjellesvig-Waering based its new clade mainly on the presence of supplementary lobes (distal lobes in a plate-like segment which contains the genital aperture called genital operculum), as well as in the intramarginal eyes.

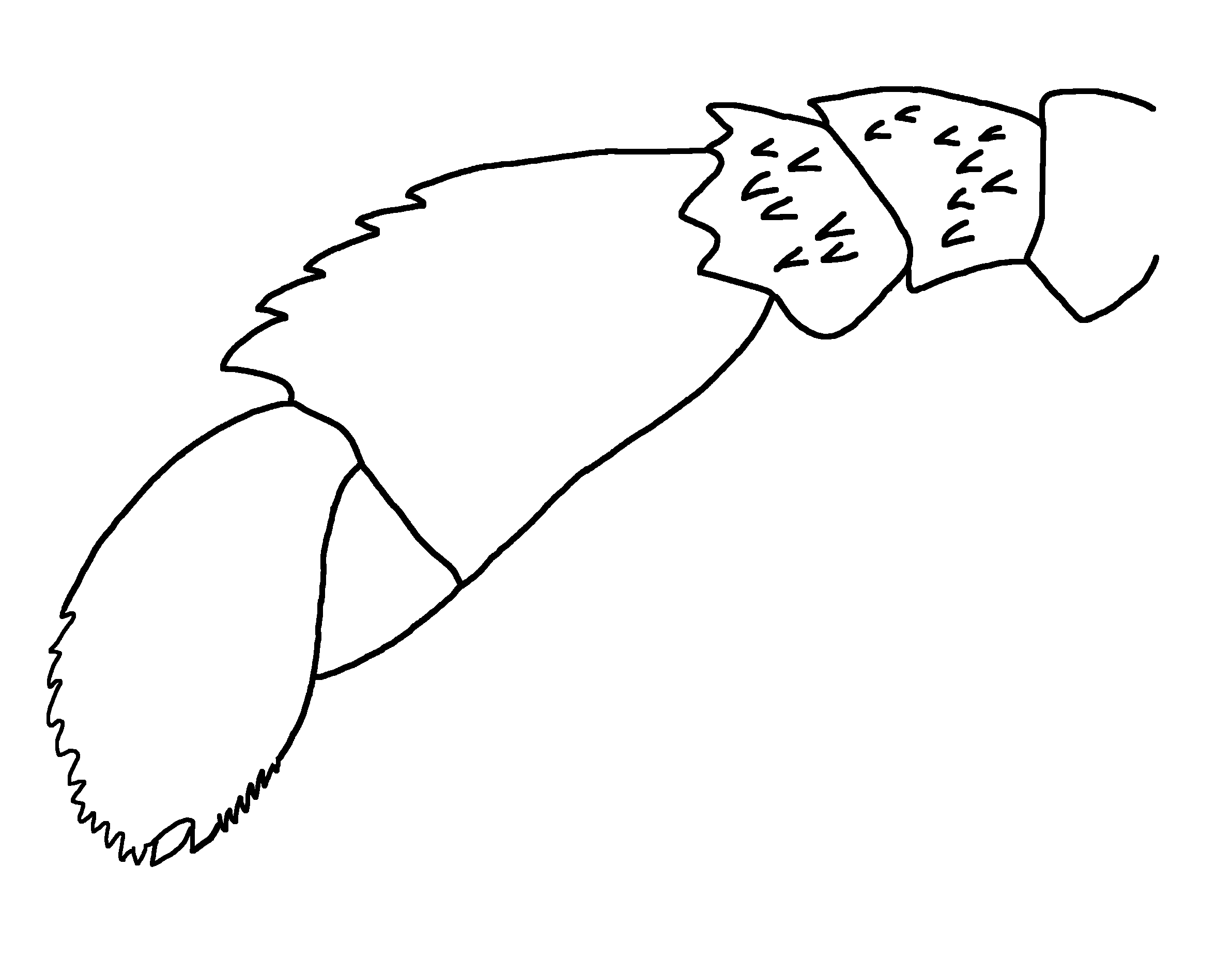
Reconstruction of the swimming leg of Bassipterus.

In 1964, Kjellesvig-Waering described the genital operculum of the species H. (N.) phelpsae and suggested that this part of the body could have great phylogenetic importance in the future. Two years later, together with the American paleontologist Kenneth Edward Caster, he raised H. (N.) phelpsae to the generic level under the name Pittsfordipterus. They also described a new genus and species, Bassipterus virginicus. It differs essentially from other adelophthalmoids by the specialization of its genital appendage, with characteristics reminiscent of Eurypterus.

In 1989, Victor P. Tollerton Jr. described the family Adelophthalmidae along with many others, including Adelophthalmus, Parahughmilleria, Bassipterus and Unionopterus. This clade was based on the presence of spines in the second to fifth pair of appendages, a swimming leg of Adelophthalmus-type and the presence of epimera (lateral "extensions" of the segment) in the seventh segment. Tollerton commented that some species of Adelophthalmus that did not have spines in the appendages may be better placed in a new genus in the family Slimonidae (he mentioned the now invalid Slimonioidea). Although a new genus for spineless species could be phylogenetically supported, moving it to Slimonidae based on the loss of a feature which seems to have been lost separately in the two groups is not in line with common practice.

Odd Erik Tetlie in an unpublished thesis of 2004 erected the superfamily Adelophthalmoidea and the family Nanahughmilleridae. Adelophthalmoidea was diagnosed as eurypterids with parabolic carapaces, small reniform eyes, appendages of variable spinosity and a lanceolate telson, among others. This superfamily would be formally described two years later by Tetlie and Peter Van Roy. On the other hand, Nanahughmilleridae was described to contain the adelophthalmoids with no or reduced genital spatulae and the second to fifth pair of prosomal (of the prosoma, "head") appendages of Hughmilleria-type. This family contained Nanahughmileria, Pittsfordipterus and perhaps Parahughmilleria. However, the clade was almost never used in subsequent studies and lists of eurypterids, and instead, they classified the nanahughmillerids as part of Adelophthalmidae.

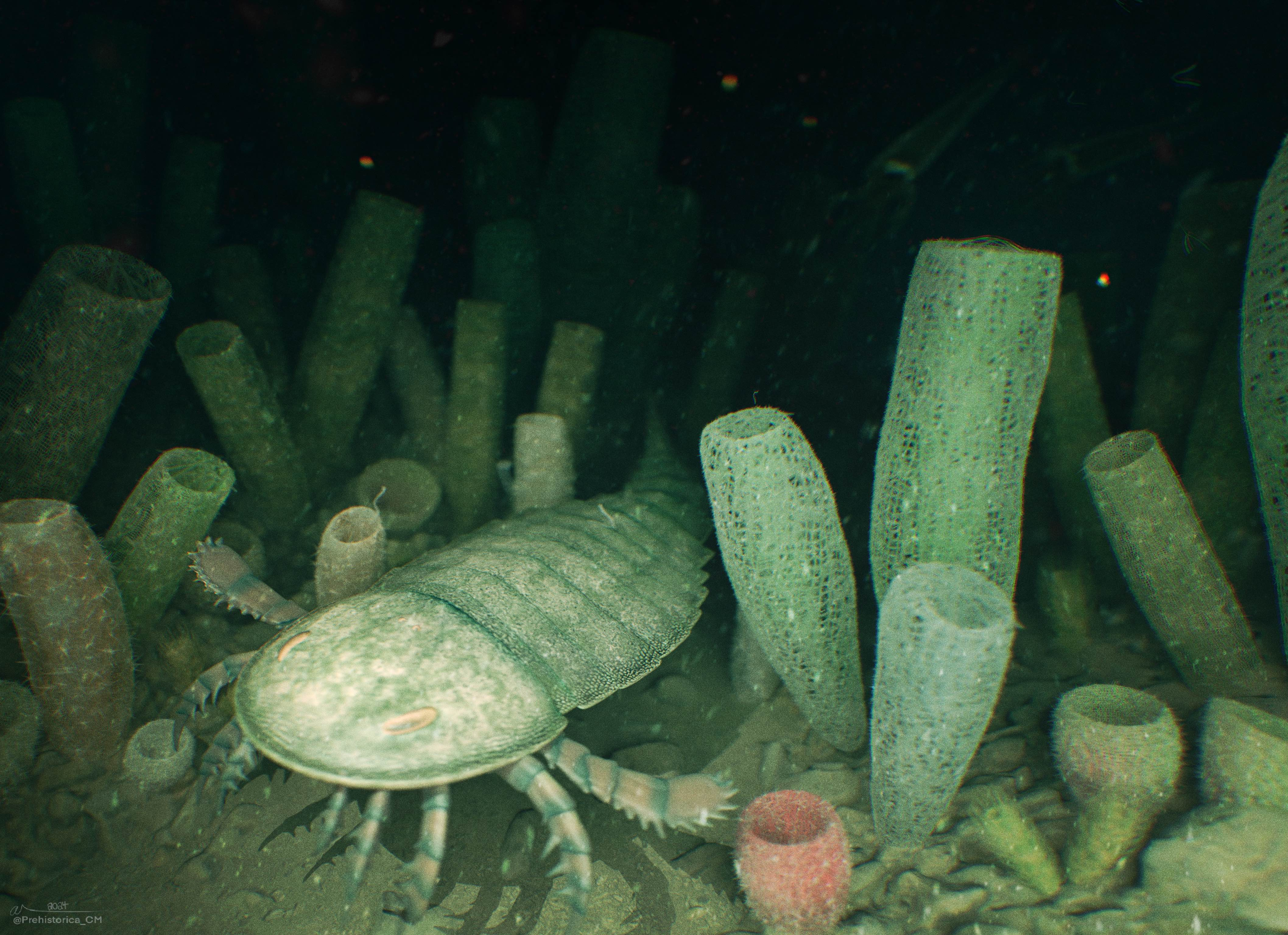
Restoration of Archopterus anjiensis amongst a reef of Glass sponges.

In 2008, Nanahughmilleria patteni was recognized as a different and much more basal species, and therefore a new genus, Eysyslopterus, was named by Tetlie and Markus Poschmann. The carapace of Eysyslopterus and other basal members of the closely related Pterygotioidea (Herefordopterus) and the waeringopteroids (Orcanopterus) has been shown as almost identical, only differing between them by the position of the eyes. Due to the intramarginal position of the eyes, Eysyslopterus has been classified within Adelophthalmidae, but it has also been suggested that it is the sister taxon (closest relative) of a clade formed by Adelophthalmoidea and Pterygotioidea. However, this can not be demonstrated until more fossil material is found.

In 2023, Archopterus anjiensis, a new genus and species, was described based on a single specimen found in the Ordovician-aged Wenchang Formation of Zhejiang, China, representing the oldest known record of the Adelophthalmidae, extending the stratigraphic record of the family some 10 million years older from the early Silurian into the late Ordovician.

In a 2025 monograph, James Lamsdell divided the Adelophthalmoidea into four families to reflect the phylogenetic relationships inside the group: Adelophthalmidae (Adelophthalmus, Selkiepterella, Unionopterus, and Wiedopterus), Nanahughmilleriidae (Nanahughmilleria), Parahughmilleriidae (Parahughmilleria and Pruemopterus), and Pittsfordipteridae (Archopterus, Bassipterus, and Pittsfordipterus). Lamsdell transferred Eysyslopterus to the Waeringopteridae.

== Evolutionary history ==
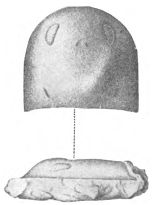
Type and only known specimen of Nanahughmilleria prominens, one of the earliest adelophthalmoids.

The eurypterids as a group peaked in diversity during the Silurian; of the approximately 250 valid species accounted for as of 2026, around 139 (≈56 %) were from the Silurian alone. Many eurypterid groups are first recorded from the Silurian, such as Pterygotioidea, Mycteropoidea, Stylonuroidea and Adelophthalmoidea itself. The most primitive members of Adelophthalmoidea evolved in Laurussia (an ancient supercontinent, also known as Euramerica). In fact, the most basal species of the clade so far (Eysyslopterus patteni) has been recovered from Ludlovian (around 427–423 mya) deposits of the paleocontinent Baltica (Scandinavia and Eastern Europe, precisely Estonia). However, it is not possible to determine where the clade originated, probably in Baltica or Laurentia (most of eastern continental North America). Although most of the representatives of Adelophthalmoidea have been found in Laurentia, Avalonia (Germany, Great Britain, parts of eastern North America) and Baltica (that is, Laurussia), the nearly cosmopolitan (worldwide) genus Adelophthalmus was also present in the Rheno-Hercynian Terrane (western and central Europe), Siberia and in the Gondwana part of the current Australia.

In the Silurian, most of the adelophthalmoid genera would appear, but all went extinct soon after or in the Middle Devonian. The oldest representatives of the group were Parahughmilleria maria and Nanahughmilleria prominens, both from the Llandovery (around 444–433 mya), suggesting that the adelophthalmoids first appeared around this epoch. This is supported by the appearance of the basal pterygotioids, the sister group of the adelophthalmoids, in the Llandovery. However, the fossil record of Adelophthalmoidea is very poor in the Early Silurian and both species have disputed ages. The unequivocally oldest representative was P. hefteri, with fossils found in the Kip Burn Formation, Lesmahagow, Scotland, from the beginning of the Wenlockian epoch (around 433–427 mya). These fossils differ slightly in the proportions of the body with the fossils of its type locality (in Germany) and have been compared with the latter ones, but the assignment of the Scottish fossils to P. hefteri is not entirely certain. The first species lived in brackish-estuarine water or in fully marine habitats.

In the Emsian (around 393–408 mya, in Early Devonian), the earliest species of Adelophthalmus appeared, A. sievertsi, presenting basal features such as the wide swimming leg (as in Nanahughmilleria and Parahughmilleria). The eurypterids were one of the groups most heavily affected by the Late Devonian extinction event, following a major decline in diversity during the Early Devonian, eurypterids were rare in marine environments by the Late Devonian. Of the 16 eurypterid families that had been alive at the beginning of the Devonian, only three persisted into the Carboniferous, all of them non-marine groups. The suborder Eurypterina was rendered almost completely extinct, only surviving Adelophthalmoidea (represented by Adelophthalmus).

Size comparison of the largest species of five adelophthalmoid genera. Eysyslopterus, included in the chart, was previously considered an adelophthalmoid but has since been reclassified as a waeringopteroid.

Adelophthalmus would rapidly diversify, already being present in Siberia and Gondwana (Australia) since the Devonian. In the Carboniferous, the distribution of Adelophthalmus became approximately circumequatorial (around the Equator). Out of the 33 species referred to Adelophthalmus, 23 (69%) were from the Carboniferous alone, reaching its peak diversity in the Late Carboniferous and becoming the most common of all eurypterids of the Late Paleozoic. This quick diversification may be due to their morphology, converting the adelophthalmoids in one of the most able swimmers among the eurypterids. The amalgamation (union) of Pangaea into a global supercontinent was also an important factor. The pterygotoids were also successful swimmers, but they went extinct in the Middle Devonian, long before the formation of Pangea. Although Unionopterus also appeared in the Carboniferous, this genus is very little known and is usually ignored by the eurypterid researchers.

During the Late Carboniferous and Early Permian, Adelophthalmus lived in brackish and freshwater environments adjacent to coastal plains, a type of common and stable habitat at the time. Although the formation of Pangea helped the genus to widespread, it also affected its environments. They began to disappear due to a climatic change that caused alterations of depositional and vegetational patterns across the world, provoking a decrease in number of the genus. A. sellardsi from the Artinskian (around 290–284 mya, Early Permian) epoch of Kansas, United States, was the last species of Adelophthalmus and therefore of all the suborder Eurypterina. The genus expanded the temporal range of the suborder by about 100 million years and turned its family to the longest lasting single family of eurypterids. Nevertheless, the eurypterids continued to exist represented by the stylonurids. The Russian hibbertopterid species Campylocephalus permianus persisted until the Changhsingian (around 254–252 mya, Late Permian) stage, being the last known eurypterid. No eurypterids are known from fossil beds higher than the Permian, indicating that they probably died out in the Permian–Triassic mass extinction event or shortly before.

== Classification ==
=== External phylogeny ===
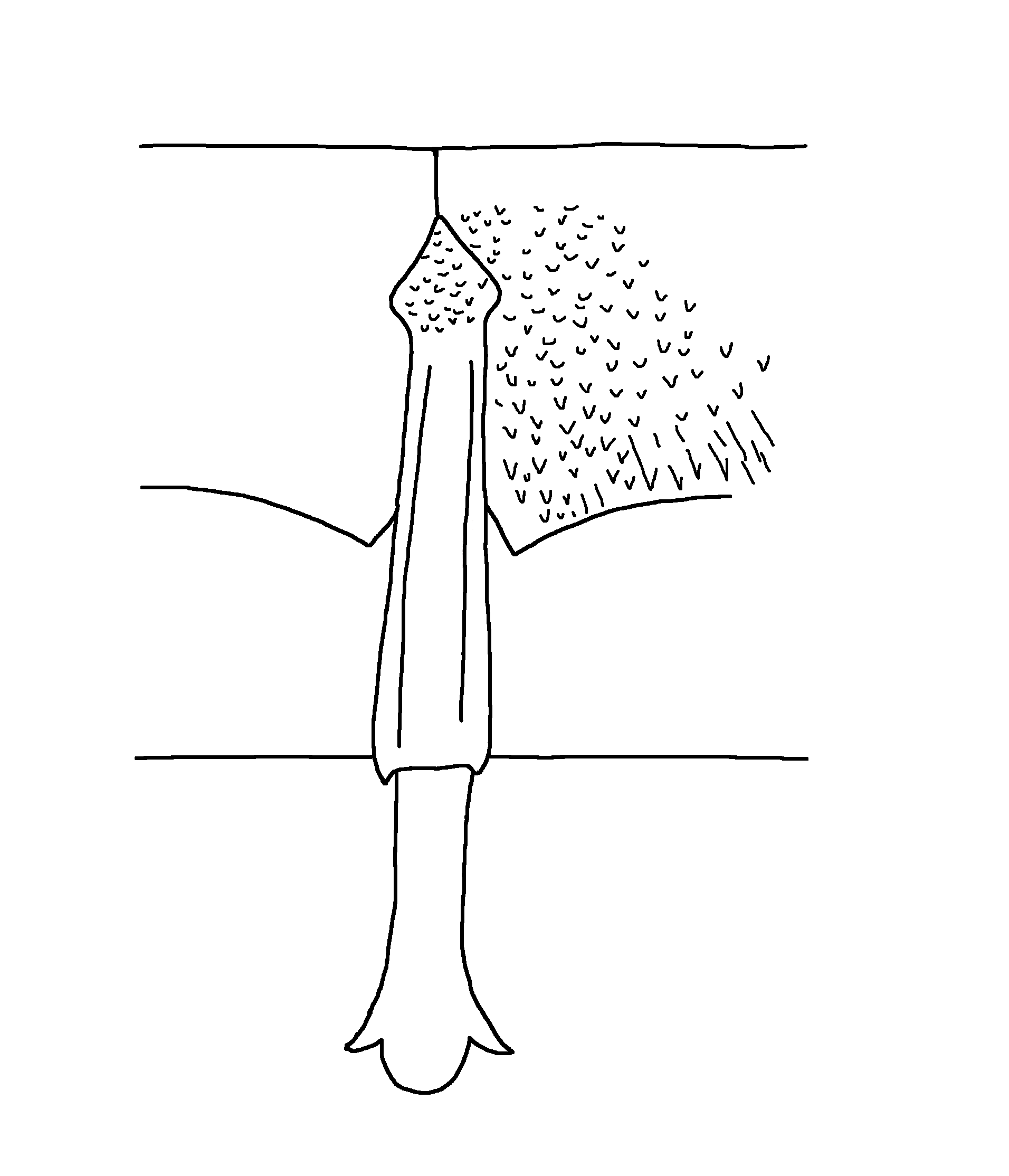
Type A genital appendage of Pittsfordipterus phelpsae.

The adelophthamids are classified within the infraorder Diploperculata, in the Eurypterina suborder of eurypterids. The infraorder Diploperculata contains the four most derived superfamilies of eurypterine eurypterids; Carcinosomatoidea, Adelophthalmoidea, Pterygotioidea and the waeringopteroids, united by the shared feature that the genital operculum (the structure that contains the genital appendage) is made up of two fused segments.

Adelophthalmoidea was one of the most diverse taxonomically eurypterid clades, with about 40 species described. The sister group of Adelophthalmoidea, Pterygotioidea, surpassed this amount with around 50 described species, becoming the most diverse superfamily to date. These sister-clades are the most derived in the Eurypterina and make up more than a third of all the species of eurypterids, with almost 100 species between both of them.

The cladogram below is simplified from 2007 study by O. Erik Tetlie, showcasing the position of Adelophthalmoidea within the suborder Eurypterina. Placement of Diploperculata follows Lamsdell et al. 2013.

- Eurypterida
  - - Stylonurina
  - Eurypterina
    - Megalograptoidea
    - - Eurypteroidea
      - Diploperculata
        - Carcinosomatoidea
        - - Waeringopteroidea
          - - Adelophthalmoidea
            - Pterygotioidea
              - Hughmilleria
              - - Herefordopterus
                - - Slimonia
                  - - Pterygotidae

=== Internal phylogeny ===
All adelophthalmoids have a series of shared characteristics that make them different from the rest of eurypterids. However, some genera developed different features within Adelophthalmoidea that divide the superfamily into several smaller clades and groupings. The genera Parahughmilleria and Adelophthalmus form a derived clade based on the presence of enlarged spines on at least one podomere in the appendage V (fifth limb), the presence of epimera in the postabdomen (body segments 8 to 12) and the large spatulae that has been associated with the genital operculum. Nanahughmilleria is placed as the sister taxon of this clade but more basal due to the increased spinosity of its appendage V and in the small size of the genital spatulae. Bassipterus and Pittsfordipterus are positioned as relatively more basal to this clade and form a group supported by two synapomorphies (shared characteristics different from that of their latest common ancestor); long narrow eyes and a complex termination of the genital appendage.

The cladogram below follows Lamsdell (2025).

- Adelophthalmoidea
  - Nanahughmilleriidae
    - Nanahughmilleria notosiberica
    - - Nanahughmilleria clarkei
      - Nanahughmilleria norvegica
  - - Parahughmilleriidae
      - Pruemopterus salgadoi
      - - Parahughmilleria pygmaea
        - - Parahughmilleria hefteri
          - Parahughmilleria fuea
    - - Pittsfordipteridae
        - Archopterus anjiensis
        - - Bassipterus bellistriata
          - - Pittsfordipterus maria
            - Pittsfordipterus phelpsae
      - Adelophthalmidae
        - Wiedopterus noctua
        - Adelophthalmus
          - - Adelophthalmus sievertsi
            - Adelophthalmus waterstoni
          - - Adelophthalmus luceroensis
            - - Adelophthalmus irinae
              - Adelophthalmus kamyshtensis
            - - Adelophthalmus zadrai
              - - Adelophthalmus imhofi
                - Adelophthalmus wilsoni
              - - Adelophthalmus granosus
                - - Adelophthalmus dumonti
                  - Adelophthalmus moyseyi
              - - Adelophthalmus approximatus
                - - - Adelophthalmus mansfieldi
                    - Adelophthalmus mazonensis
                  - - Adelophthalmus douvillei
                    - Adelophthalmus sellardsi

== Paleoecology ==
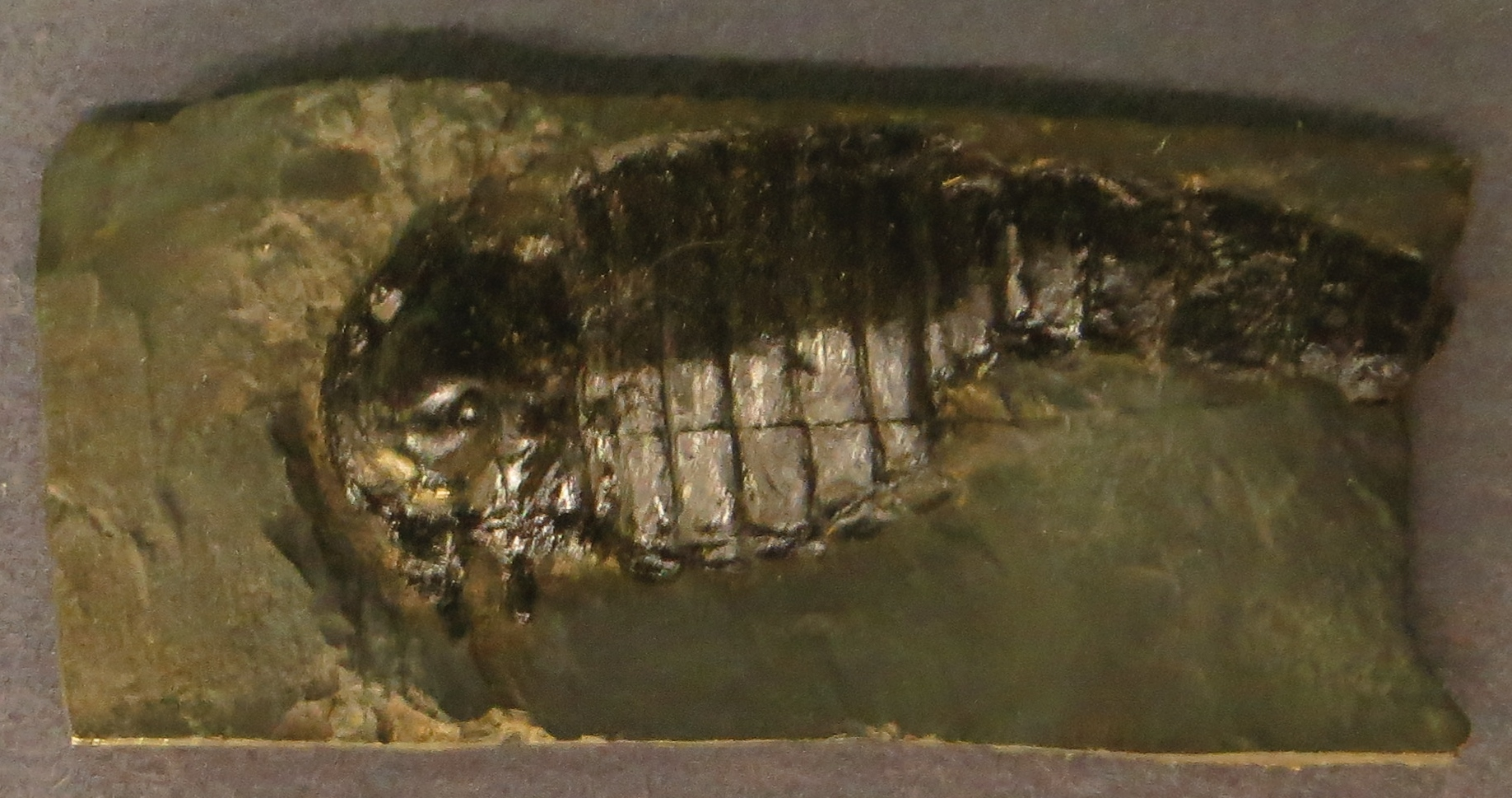
Fossil of Adelophthalmus imhofi, exhibited at the Senckenberg Museum, Frankfurt.

The adelophthalmoids as a whole inhabited environments situated near the coastal realm, with preferences in lagoons, estuaries or deltas, which have reduced salinity. A marine influence is commonly found in horizons (sections of the fossil site) that comprise eurypterids, but marine index fossils (fossils that indicate a marine environment and ecosystem) in many cases are not associated with eurypterids. In some cases, where the adelophthalmoids are very rare, the fossils could have been deposited in a different place from the one they originated, exemplified by A. waterstoni, which is known from a single specimen that is in turn the only eurypterid of the zone, the Gogo Formation of Australia, where more than 2,000 crustaceans have been found.

The first adelophthalmoids, for example the Scottish Parahughmilleria hefteri, have been conserved in non-marine brackish-estuarine habitats, with possible tidal influence, although basal forms that inhabited completely marine deposits are known. This preference remained constant in Adelophthalmoidea until Adelophthalmus appeared. In deposits of the Early Devonian of Germany, where Parahughmilleria hefteri and Adelophthalmus sievertsi coexisted, a more obvious marine influence is observed in the sections dominated by Parahughmilleria than in those dominated by Adelophthalmus. This suggests that Adelophthalmus had a preference for habitats dominated by freshwater, unlike other more basal forms. This preference for freshwater habitats is stronger during the Bashkirian and Moscovian times (in the Late Carboniferous), times in which fossils of Adelophthalmus have been associated with freshwater bivalves and terrestrial organisms in coal-bearing strata (indicating a coal swamp environment).

However, this could be related to the diversification of Adelophthalmus in those epochs more than an ecological change in the whole genus. Most of the Adelophthalmus species were confined to paralic (in shallow water near the coast) or lowland basins, in depositional environments that had a close connection with marginally marine habitats. For example, during the Moscovian, the Saar-Nahe Basin (where fossils of A. granosus have been found), was connected or even part of a vast western subsiding area (a sunken zone) in whose drainage went towards the Paleo-Tethys Ocean, some 1,500 kilometres (930 miles) towards the south. During the Late Pennsylvanian and Early Permian, due to the southern uplift, the drainage began to go north towards the Panthalassa Ocean, increasing the distance to the ocean (about 2,400 km, 1490 mi). Adelophthalmus is not found in these deposits, while others indicative of a connection with a marginal marine habitat, such as the belinurid xiphosurans, persisted. Some of the last occurrences of the adelophthalmoids (end of the Carboniferous and Early Permian) seem to have had a kind of reversion in ecological preferences, inhabiting environments with a strong marine influence again, the especially tidally estuarine environments.

Adelophthalmoidea is considered as a euryhaline (able to adapt in different salinities) clade that inhabited stressful habitats with regard to paleosalinity and possibly oxygen whose conquest of freshwater habitats was not as successful as in other animals such as the aforementioned bellinurids.

== See also ==
- List of eurypterid genera
- Timeline of eurypterid research
