= Archaeaphorme =

Archaeaphorme Temporal range: Hirnantian

Scientific classification
- Kingdom: Animalia
- Phylum: Porifera
- Class: Hexactinellida
- Order: Lyssacinosida
- Family: Rossellidae
- Genus: †Archaeaphorme
- Species: †A. conica

Binomial name
- †Archaeaphorme conica Botting et al., 2025

Extinct genus of sponges

Archaeaphorme is an extinct genus of rossellid that lived during the Hirnantian stage of the Late Ordovician epoch.

== Distribution ==
Archaeaphorme conica is known from the Anji Biota of China.
