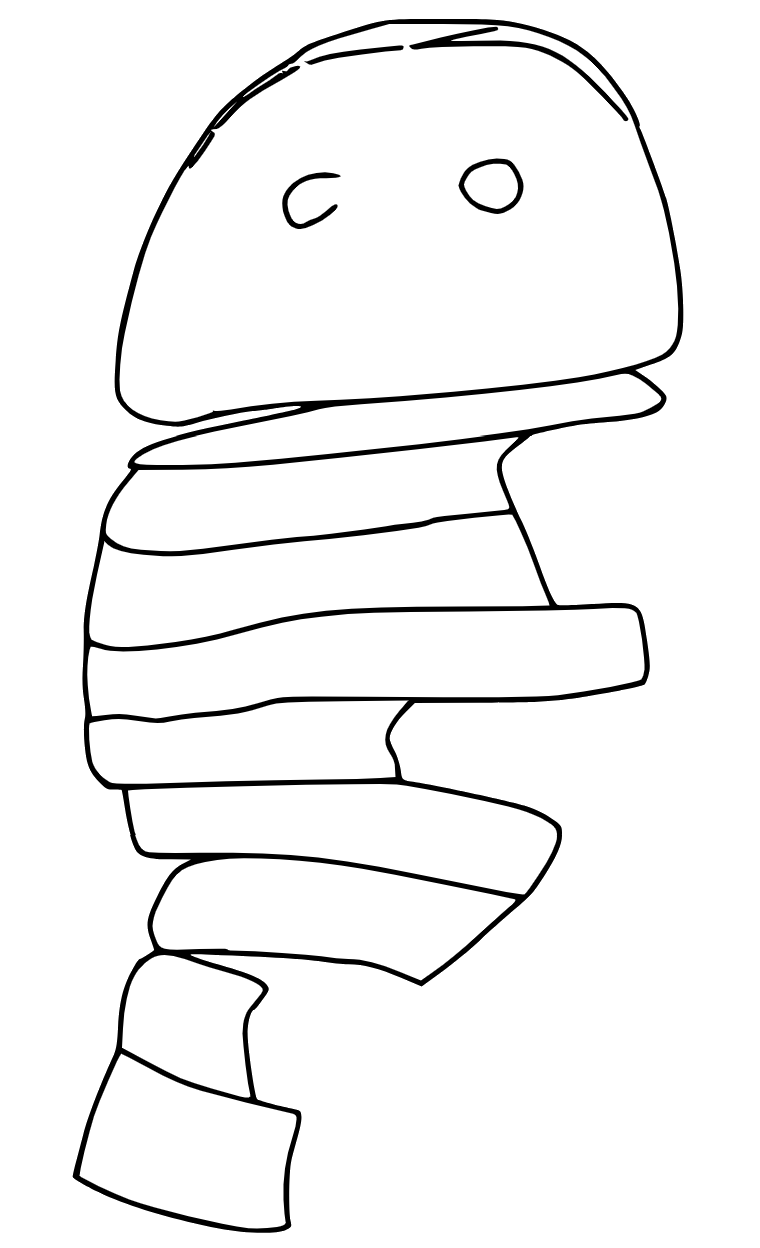
- Illustration of PWL2013/5224-LS, the type specimen of W. noctua

Scientific classification
- Kingdom: Animalia
- Phylum: Arthropoda
- Subphylum: Chelicerata
- Order: †Eurypterida
- Superfamily: †Adelophthalmoidea
- Family: †Adelophthalmidae
- Genus: †Wiedopterus; Poschmann, 2015
- Species: †W. noctua

Binomial name
- †Wiedopterus noctua Poschmann, 2015

= Wiedopterus =

Wiedopterus Temporal range: Emsian, 407.6–393.3 Ma

Extinct genus of Devonian eurypterids

Wiedopterus is a genus of eurypterid, an extinct group of aquatic arthropods. The type and only species of Wiedopterus, W. noctua, is known from deposits of Early Devonian age in Germany. The generic name derives from the Wied river, which runs near the site of the initial discovery, and the species name, noctua, derives from Latin noctua (owl) which refers to the superficial resemblance of the carapace (head plate) to an owl.

A small eurypterid, the type and only known specimen of Wiedopterus does not preserve the appendages or the underside of the body, which initially made certain classification of the genus difficult. Wiedopterus was formally classified as Eurypterina incertae sedis (indicating uncertain placement within the Eurypterina suborder of eurypterids), though similarities to the Adelophthalmoidea was noticed already during its initial description. Wiedopterus was formally classified as an adelophthalmid in 2025.

== Description ==
Wiedopterus was a relatively small eurypterid, with the only described fossil specimen, measuring 4.43 centimeters (1.74 in) in length, accounting for a little over half of the animal. If Wiedopterus was an adelophthalmoid, it would be a medium-sized member of the group, whose members ranged in length from 4 to 32 centimeters (1.6 to 12.6 in).

The diagnostic features of the genus, as noted by Poschmann in its description, include the carapace (head plate) being shaped like a trapezoid and having a narrow marginal rim, the compound eyes being placed close to the center of the carapace, the preabdomen (body segments 1–7) being rounded and wide, with the anteriormost (most forwardly placed) tergite being reduced in size, the tergites possessing narrow anterior articulation facets, the dorsal (back) preabdomen not having any prominent ornamentation, and that there is a marked constriction between the preabdomen and the postabdomen (body segments 8–12). The preabdomen of Wiedopterus was widest at the third or fourth segment, where it measured about 2.05 centimeters (0.81 in) in width.

== History of research ==
Wiedopterus noctua was described by Poschmann in 2015 based on a single specimen recovered in fossil deposits of Early Devonian, probably Emsian, age. The fossil locality, part of the Rhenish Massif, is a wayside outcrop located next to a bus stop, about 500 meters north of the village Bürdenbach and 90 meters northeast of the confluence of the small creek Güllesheimer Bach and the Lahrbach river.

The Wiedopterus type specimen, given the designation PWL2013/5224-LS, preserves the carapace and the first to ninth segment of the opisthosoma, though these are somewhat damaged on the right side. PWL2013/5224-LS was noted by Poschmann to not be the only eurypterid fossil clearly distinguishable from the other eurypterids found at the site, belonging to the genus Parahughmilleria, but it was the only fossil well-preserved enough to be described and formally named. The generic name Wiedopterus refers to the valley formed by the Wied river, located near the locality where the holotype specimen was found. The epithet -pterus, from the Ancient GreekAncient Greek: φτερός ("wing") is commonly used for eurypterid genera. The species name noctua is Latin for "owl" and derives from Poschmann finding the carapace and the eyes of Wiedopterus to be "somewhat reminiscent of an owl".

== Classification ==
Wiedopterus is different from other known Early Devonian eurypterids when it comes to the position of its compound eyes and the shape of its carapace. Moselopterus, Alkenopterus, Vinetopterus and Erieopterus are superficially similar, but Moselopterus, Alkenopterus and Vinetopterus all have a more horseshoe-shaped carapace, with the carapace of Moselopterus also has distinct ornamentation, missing in Wiedopterus, and Alkenopterus and Vinetopterus have wider and differently shaped, respectively, marginal rims. Erieopterus has a more rounded carapace, with the eyes positioned more outwardly. The shape and eye position is also similar to the Silurian Eurypterus (though the carapace of Eurypterus is slightly more quadratic, the eyes are positioned further back and its first opisthosomal tergite is not as small), the Silurian Buffalopterus and the Silurian–Devonian Strobilopterus (though Buffalopterus and Strobilopterus have a wider carapace and eyes positioned further back).

Among the Early Devonian eurypterids, the only species that has a carapace shape similar to Wiedopterus, beyond just superficial similarity, is Adelophthalmus sievertsi, though A. sievertsi can be distinguished from Wiedopterus by its carapace and opisthosoma being ornamented by large and small tubercles (rounded projections), and that it had lateral epimera on its preabdominal tergites (spines along the edges). The Wiedopterus type specimen does not preserve the appendages or its ventral (underside) anatomy, which makes certain classification of the genus impossible. Several features suggest that Wiedopterus was an adelophthalmid eurypterid, including the general outline of its body, the first tergite being reduced in size, there being morphological differentiation of the body into a pre- and postabdomen, and there being longitudinal ridges on the postabdominal segments, which were subrectangular (vaguely rectangular) in shape. Wiedopterus possessed a median eye tubercle (a large tubercle between the eyes), a feature present in derived genera within both the Eurypterina and Stylonurina suborders. The feature is, among other genera, present in Adelophthalmus. Markus Poschmann, who described Wiedopterus, classified the genus as Eurypterina incertae sedis (indicating uncertain placement within the Eurypterina suborder of eurypterids), but noted that the Wiedopterus fossils "probably represent adelophthalmoids", perhaps a relatively derived representative since it shares the centrally positioned eyes with Adelophthalmus.

In 2025, James Lamsdell classified Wiedopterus in Adelophthalmidae, having recovered Wiedopterus as the sister taxon of Adelophthalmus in a phylogenetic analysis.

== Paleoecology ==
The fossil deposits in which the Wiedopterus type specimen was found were once a land–sea transitional area, featuring rivers, deltas and fully marine environments, where the fossils were deposited under rapid environmental changes. Other fossil life known from the same deposits include jawless fish (Rhinopteraspis), trigonotarbids (Spinocharinus and Archaeomartus), scorpions (Waeringoscorpio), chasmataspidids, bivalves and other eurypterids (Parahughmilleria). Also present were early land plants, most prominently Zosterophyllopsida.

== See also ==
- List of eurypterid genera
- Timeline of eurypterid research
