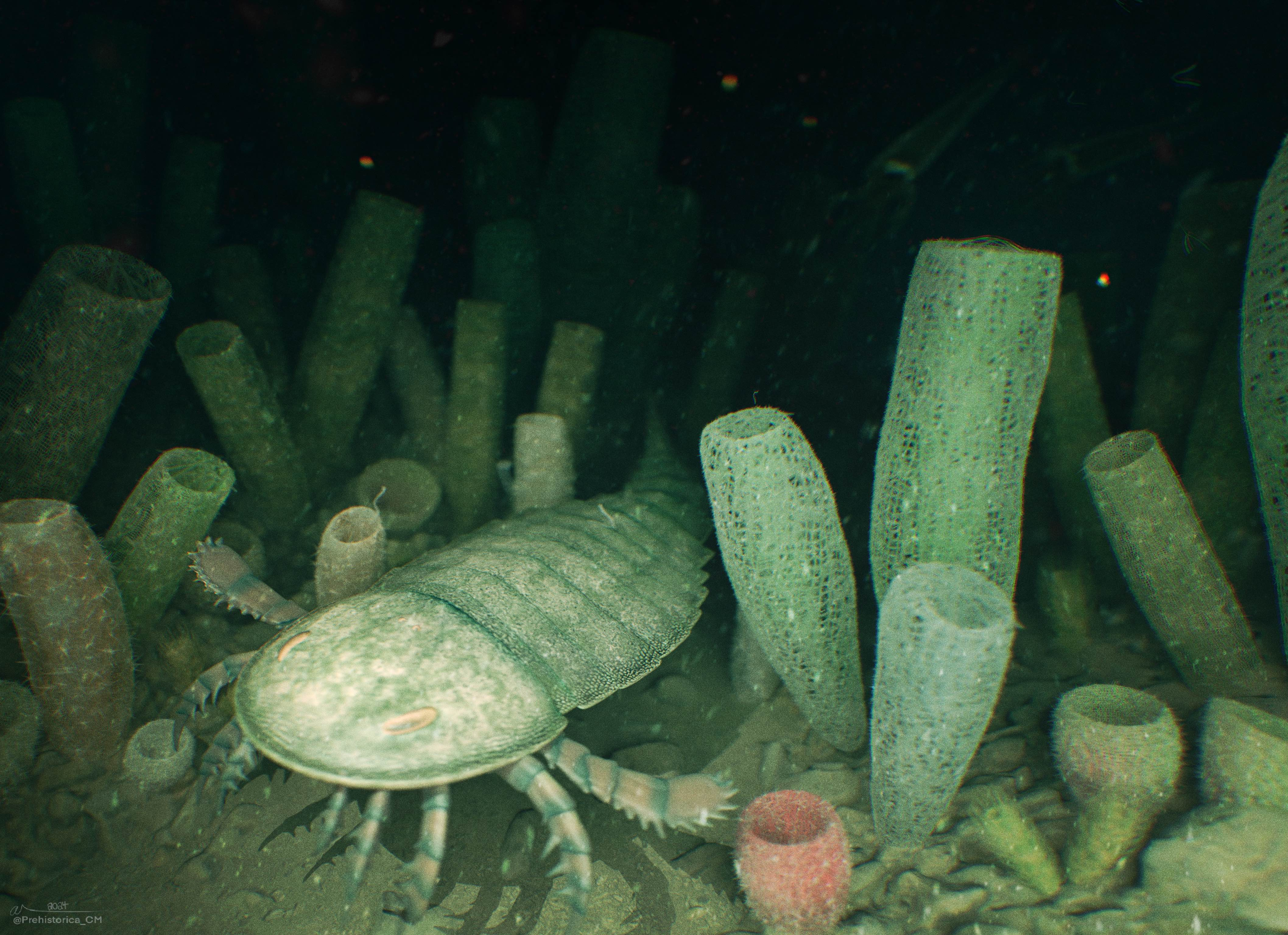
- Reconstruction of A. anjiensis swimming through a glass sponge reef.

Scientific classification
- Kingdom: Animalia
- Phylum: Arthropoda
- Subphylum: Chelicerata
- Order: †Eurypterida
- Superfamily: †Adelophthalmoidea
- Family: †Pittsfordipteridae
- Genus: †Archopterus; Wang et al., 2023
- Species: †A. anjiensis

Binomial name
- †Archopterus anjiensis Wang et al., 2023

= Archopterus =

Archopterus Temporal range: Late Ordovician, 455 Ma

Fossil genus of arthropod

Archopterus is a genus of eurypterid in the family Pittsfordipteridae, represented by one species. It was discovered in the Wenchang Formation of Tianfucun, Anji County, Zhejiang Province, South China. This genus is represented by a single species (Archopterus anjiensis) from the Ordovician, the oldest species from China and also of its family.

== Description ==
Archopterus was a predator that may have fed on small mollusks, crustaceans and worms.

== Fossil importance ==
The only known fossil, found alongside various Hexactinellid sponges, graptolites, and nautiloids in deep-water shale, known as the Anji Biota, now extends the range of the family of Adelophthalmidae from the early Silurian to late Ordovician. This also now supports the theory of the evolution of eurypterids in Gondwana.
