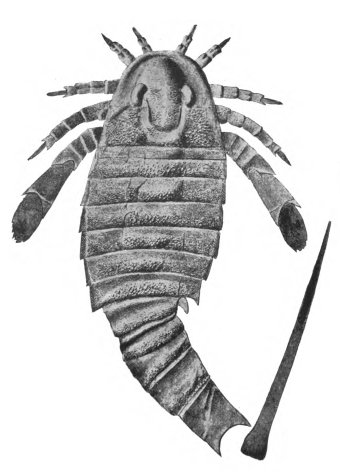
- Fossil specimen of A. mansfieldi illustrated by James Hall

Scientific classification
- Kingdom: Animalia
- Phylum: Arthropoda
- Subphylum: Chelicerata
- Order: †Eurypterida
- Superfamily: †Adelophthalmoidea
- Family: †Adelophthalmidae
- Genus: †Adelophthalmus; Jordan in Jordan & von Mayer, 1854

Type species
- †Adelophthalmus granosus Jordan in Jordan & von Meyer, 1854

Species
- 33 species: †A. approximatus (Hall & Clarke, 1888); †A. asturica (Melendez, 1971); †A. bradorensis (Bell, 1922); †A. cambieri (Pruvost, 1930); †?A. carbonarius Chernyshev, 1933; †A. chinensis (Grabau, 1920); †A. corneti (Pruvost, 1939); †A. douvillei (de Lima, 1890); †A. dubius Shpinev, 2012; †A. dumonti (Stainier, 1915); †A. granosus Jordan, 1854; †A. imhofi (Reuss, 1855); †A. irinae Shpinev, 2006; †A. khakassicus Shpinev & Filimonov, 2018; †A. kamyshtensis Shpinev, 2012; †A. kidstoni (Peach, 1888); †?A. lohesti (Dewalque, 1889); †A. luceroensis Kues & Kietzke, 1981; †A. mansfieldi (Hall, 1877); †A. mazonensis (Meek & Worthen, 1868); †A. moyseyi (Woodward, 1907); †A. nebraskensis (Barbour, 1914); †A. pennsylvanicus (Hall, 1877); †?A. perornatus (Peach, 1882); †A. piussii Lamsdell, Simonetto & Selden, 2013; †A. pruvosti (Kjellesvig-Waering, 1948); †A. pyrrhae Lamsdell et al., 2020; †?A. raniceps (Goldenberg, 1873); †A. sellardsi (Dunbar, 1924); †A. sievertsi (Størmer, 1969); †A. waterstoni (Tetlie et al., 2004); †A. wilsoni (Woodward, 1888); †A. zadrai Přibyl, 1952

Synonyms
- Genus synonymy: Lepidoderma Reuss, 1855; Anthraconectes Meek & Worthen, 1868; Polyzosternites Goldenberg, 1873; Glyptoscorpius Peach, 1882; Synonyms of A. mansfieldi: Eurypterus stylus Hall, 1884; Synonyms of A. moyseyi: Eurypterus derbiensis Woodward, 1907; Synonyms of A. perornatus: A. caledonicus Peach, 1882; Synonyms of A. sievertsi: Eurypterus trapezoides Størmer, 1974; Synonyms of A. sellardsi: A. oklahomensis Decker, 1938

= Adelophthalmus =

Adelophthalmus Temporal range: Early Devonian–Early Permian, 407.6–283.5 Ma

Genus of arthropods (fossil)

Adelophthalmus is a genus of eurypterid, an extinct group of aquatic arthropods. Fossils of Adelophthalmus have been discovered in deposits ranging in age from the Early Devonian to the Early Permian, which makes it the longest lived of all known eurypterid genera, with a total temporal range of over 120 million years. Adelopththalmus was the final genus of the Eurypterina suborder of eurypterids and consisted the only known genus of swimming eurypterids from the Middle Devonian until its extinction during the Permian, after which the few surviving eurypterids were all walking forms of the suborder Stylonurina.

Fossils of Adelophthalmus have been described from four continents; North America, Europe, Asia and Australia, which indicates that Adelophthalmus might have had a nearly cosmopolitan (worldwide) distribution, one of few eurypterid genera to achieve one besides potentially Pterygotus. The territorial expansion of Adelophthalmus had begun early, with representatives found in both Siberia and Australia during the Devonian, but it first gained its almost cosmopolitan distribution following the amalgamation of the supercontinent Pangaea during the Carboniferous and Permian.

The generic name Adelophthalmus means "no obvious eye", referencing that the holotype fossil seemingly represented an eyeless eurypterid, with a carapace (head plate) completely lacking any indication of eyes. Though this has caused much subsequent confusion, including the naming of several junior synonyms, the apparent eyelessness of the type specimen is treated by modern researchers as a preservational artifact, and not a feature that any species of Adelophthalmus would have possessed in life.

Adelophthalmus was a genus of comparatively small eurypterids, with species ranging in size from 4 cm (1.6 in, A. douvillei) to 32 cm (12.6 in, A. khakassicus). As of 2020, Adelophthalmus is the most taxonomically diverse of all eurypterid genera, containing 33 species considered valid. This large amount of species, many named long ago, have prompted some researchers to designate Adelophthalmus as a "wastebasket taxon" with poorly known internal relationships and phylogeny. The genus as it is currently seen may form a monophyletic group (a group sharing a common ancestor) but might most appropriately be split into different genera along distinct clades formed within the current confines of the genus.

== Description ==
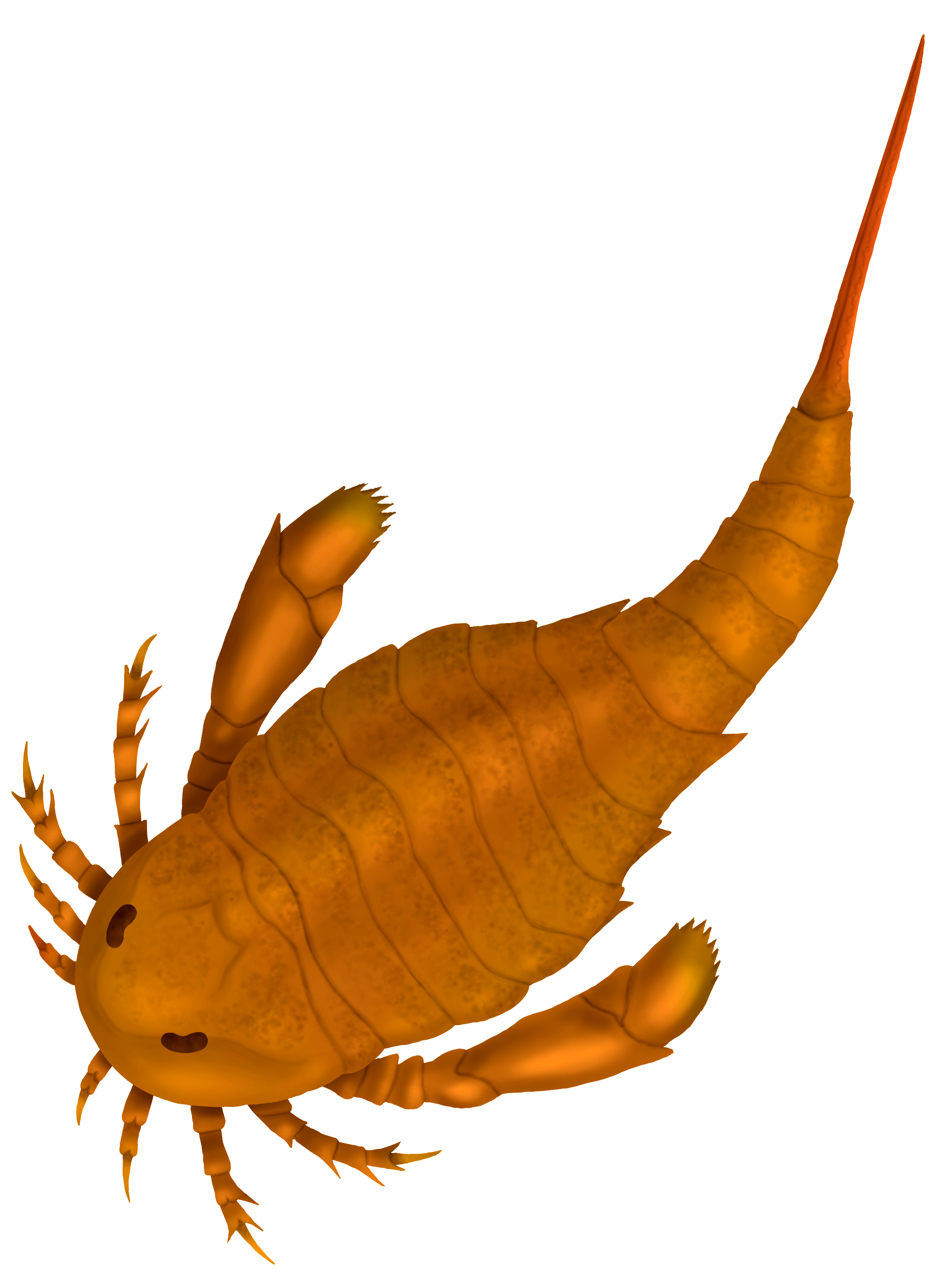
Life restoration of A. irinae.

Adelophthalmid eurypterids such as Adelophthalmus were small and streamlined nektonic (actively swimming) eurypterids with prominent cuticle sculptures (ornamentation consisting of small, minute, scales across their backs). These scales are perhaps the most distinguishing feature of the group, though similar scales have been reported in other eurypterid groups, most notably the pterygotids, as well.

Though the largest adelophthalmid, Adelophthalmus was, in comparison to larger apex predatory members of the group (such as Jaekelopterus), a genus of relatively small eurypterids. The largest species of Adelophthalmus known, A. khakassicus, reached a maximum length of approximately 32 cm (12.6 in). Many species were smaller, the smallest being the Permian A. douvillei at just 4 cm (1.6 in) in length. The genus as a whole does not appear to have fluctuated much in size over the course of its long evolutionary history, with "large" species occurring in the Devonian (A. sievertsi at 18 cm, 7 in, and A. waterstoni at 15 cm, 6 in), the Carboniferous (the aforementioned A. mazonensis, A. wilsoni at 20 cm, 7.9 in, and both A. granosus and A. zadrai at 15 cm, 6 in) and during the Permian (A. luceroensis at 18 cm, 7 in). Most of the smaller species are known from the Carboniferous, when Adelophthalmus was the most abundant, including the "medium-sized" A. irinae (13 cm, 5.1 in) and A. moyseyi (12 cm, 4.7 in) and the smaller A. mansfieldi, A. pennsylvanicus (both at 8 cm, 3.1 in), A. approximatus (7 cm, 2.8 in) and A. dumonti (6 cm, 2.4 in).

Size comparison of 11 species of Adelophthalmus.

Like most eurypterids (with some exceptions, such as Slimonia and Rhinocarcinosoma), the carapace (the segment covering the prosoma, the "head") of Adelophthalmus was parabolic in shape, with a narrow marginal rim (edge). The carapace was held in place with the aid of a small and hinged triangular "locking" mechanism placed anteriorly. The eyes were reniform (bean-shaped) and the small ocelli were located between, or slightly behind (depending on the species), the larger eyes. The metastoma (a large plate part of the abdomen) of Adelophthalmus was oval in shape, with the first opisthosomal (the opisthosoma refers to all segments after the carapace, essentially the abdomen) having a reduced length and being tapered laterally. The body of Adelophthalmus ended with a long and sharp styliform telson (the posteriormost segment, here in the shape of a spike). The feature that primarily distinguishes Adelophthalmus from other adelophthalmid eurypterids is its elongated body and the spurs present on its abdominal segments.

=== Table of species ===
The status of the 35 names (out of which two are synonyms) listed below follow a 2018 survey by German paleontologists Jason A. Dunlop and Denise Jekel and British paleontologist David Penney and size- and temporal ranges follow a 2009 study by American paleontologists James Lamsdell and Simon J. Braddy unless otherwise noted.

Species	Author	Year	Status	Length	Temporal range	Notes & description
Adelophthalmus approximatus	Hall & Clarke	1888	Valid	7 cm	Famennian (Devonian)	Originally described as a species of Eurypterus. A. approximatus is similar to A. mansfieldi, the spikes running alongside the abdomen being very similar. A. approximatus can be differentiated from A. mansfieldi by the lack of differentiation between the first three pairs and the last pair of the endognathites being less distinct.
Adelophthalmus asturica	Melendez	1971	Valid	? cm	Moscovian (Carbonferous)	Originally described as a species of the synonymized genus Lepidoderma. The posterior swimming paddles of A. asturica were particularly large.
Adelophthalmus bradorensis	Bell	1922	Valid Possible synonym of A. imhofi	? cm	Kasimovian (Carboniferous)	Originally described as a species of Anthraconectes. A. bradorensis is most similar to A. kidstoni, differing only in being proportionally shorter and not possessing indentation around the edges of the exoskeleton as A. kidstoni does.
Adelophthalmus caledonicus	Peach	1882	Synonym of A. perornatus	–	–	Originally described as a species of the synonymized genus Glyptoscorpius. Designated as a synonym of A. perornatus, though was noted as being significantly different in it possessing "comb organs" by British paleontologist Charles D. Waterston in 1958.
Adelophthalmus cambieri	Pruvost	1930	Valid Possible synonym of A. imhofi	? cm	Bashkirian (Carboniferous)	Originally described as a species of the synonymized genus Anthraconectes.
Adelophthalmus carbonarius	Chernyshev	1933	Uncertain	? cm	Bashkirian – Kasimovian (Carboniferous)	Originally described as a species of Eurypterus. A. carbonarius differed from A. luceroensis in the proportions of the body. Its carapace had a length/width ratio similar to the average value of A. luceroensis specimens of the same size class. The same ratio of the length of the metasoma to length of the mesosoma was somewhat larger than in A. luceroensis, while the ratio of the length of the prosoma to length of the mesosoma was smaller than in the latter.
Adelophthalmus chinensis	Grabau	1920	Valid	? cm	Latest Carboniferous – Asselian (Permian)	Originally described as a species of the synonymized genus Anthraconectes.
Adelophthalmus corneti	Pruvost	1939	Valid Possible synonym of A. imhofi	? cm	Bashkirian (Carboniferous)	Originally described as a species of the synonymized genus Anthraconectes.
Adelophthalmus douvillei	de Lima	1890	Valid	4 cm	Asselian – Sakmarian (Permian)	Originally described as a species of Eurypterus.
Adelophthalmus dubius	Shpinev	2012	Valid Possible synonym of A. kamyshtensis	18 cm	Middle Devonian	A slightly larger than medium-sized species, A. dubius is incredibly poorly known, the only known specimen lacking the eyes, the appendages and even the abdominal spines otherwise always present in Adelophthalmus. The species is most similar to A. mazonensis (differing in size and having a relatively longer prosoma), A. moyseyi (differing in size and having a narrower prosoma), A. nebraskensis (differing in size and having a wider prosoma), A. wilsoni (differing in a smaller and narrower prosoma) and A. zadrai (differing in size). A. dubius, A. khakassicus and A. kamyshtensis might represent synonyms.
Adelophthalmus dumonti	Stainier	1915	Valid	6 cm	Moscovian (Carboniferous)	Originally described as a species of Eurypterus. Very similar to A. mansfieldi, similar in overall shape and proportions and in the pattern of the ornamentation. They differ in A. dumonti having a broader carapace, larger eyes, a more slender thorax and the characteristic spikes running along its abdomen pointing backwards (in A. mansfieldi they point backwards and outwards).
Adelophthalmus granosus	Jordan	1854	Valid, type species	15 cm	Moscovian (Carboniferous)	A. granosus had relatively broad proportions. With the only known specimen lacking eyes and appendages, its status as diagnostic is somewhat questionable. It is possible that the large abdominal spikes of A. granosus are on the sternites (a feature shared only by A. nebraskensis) and not on the tergites as in other species, but this feature may also simply be due to deformation.
Adelophthalmus imhofi	Reuss	1855	Valid	? cm	Moscovian (Carboniferous)	Originally described as the type species of the synonymized genus Lepidoderma.
Adelophthalmus irinae	Shpinev	2006	Valid	13 cm	Tournaisian (Carboniferous)	
Adelophthalmus khakassicus	Shpinev & Filimonov	2018	Valid Possible synonym of A. kamyshtensis	32 cm	Givetian (Devonian)	A. khakassicus is similar to A. mazonensis, A. moysei and A. sellardsi. It differs from all these species in a narrower mesosoma and in a wider metasoma. It had undeveloped epimera in the seventh, eleventh and twelfth segments (being in these last two segments flattened and leaf-like). A. khakassicus, A. kamyshtensis and A. dubius might represent synonyms.
Adelophthalmus kamyshtensis	Shpinev	2012	Valid	15 cm	Middle Devonian	A medium-sized and poorly known species, A. kamyshtensis can be distinguished from most other species by its first segment being narrower relative to the other segments of the mesosoma. The characteristic abdominal spikes were present in the last segment of the mesosoma and all the metasomal segments. Compared to other species, A. kamyshtensis is most similar to A. luceroensis, A. sellardsi, A. imhofi, A. granosus, A. mazonensis, A. wilsoni and A. sievertsi. A. kamyshtensis, A. khakassicus and A. dubius might represent synonyms.
Adelophthalmus kidstoni	Peach	1888	Valid Possible synonym of A. imhofi	? cm	Moscovian (Carboniferous)	Originally described as a species of the synonymized genus Glyptoscorpius. A. kidstoni is similar to A. bradorensis but possessed indentations around the edges of its exoskeleton, a feature that separates it from all other known species of Adelophthalmus. A. kidstoni was considerably different from A. wilsoni, a contemporary species from the same location.
Adelophthalmus lohesti	Dewalque	1889	Uncertain Possible stylonurid affinities	? cm	Famennian (Devonian)	Originally described as a species of Eurypterus. A. lohesti is questionably referred to Adelophthalmus and has several features that are not consistent with the genus. These include a very wide carapace, very large eyes and what appears to be a median ridge on its carapace.
Adelophthalmus luceroensis	Kues & Kietzke	1981	Valid	18 cm	Asselian (Permian)	A medium-sized species closely related to other species of Adelophthalmus found in North America, A. luceroensis can be distinguished by its unusually wide prosoma (in other species, such as A. imhofi and A. mansfieldi, the prosoma is largely as long as wide but in A. luceroensis it is considerably more wide than it is long).
Adelophthalmus mansfieldi	Hall	1877	Valid	8 cm	Latest Carboniferous – Early Permian	Originally described as a species of Dolichopterus. A. mansfieldi is perhaps most similar to A. dumonti but has a narrower carapace, smaller eyes and a wider thorax. The spikes along the abdomen of A. mansfieldi point backwards and outwards.
Adelophthalmus mazonensis	Meek & Worthen	1868	Valid	22 cm	Moscovian (Carboniferous)	Originally described as the type species of the synonymized genus Anthraconestes.
Adelophthalmus moyseyi	Woodward	1907	Valid	12 cm	Moscovian (Carboniferous)	Originally described as a species of Eurypterus and then transferred to the synonymized genus Anthraconestes. This species is similar to A. mansfieldi, but the spikes running alongside the abdomen are noticeably less prominent in A. moyseyi.
Adelophthalmus nebraskensis	Barbour	1914	Valid	6 cm	Sakmarian (Permian)	Originally described as a species of the synonymized genus Anthraconectes. The spikes running along the abdomen of A. nebraskensis are on the sternites which separates this species from all other known species of Adelophthalmus (with the possible exception of A. granosus). A. nebraskensis is also known for its unusually long telson and generally slender and thin body plan.
Adelophthalmus oklahomensis	Decker	1938	Synonym of A. sellardsi	–	–	A. oklahomensis was synonymized with the identical A. sellardsi (of similar age and stratigraphical formation in Kansas) in 1959.
Adelophthalmus pennsylvanicus	Hall	1877	Valid	8 cm	Moscovian (Carboniferous)	Originally described as a species of Eurypterus.
Adelophthalmus perornatus	Peach	1882	Uncertain Possible hibbertopterid affinities	? cm	Viséan (Carboniferous)	Originally described as the type species of the synonymized genus Glyptoscorpius. The fragmentary fossil specimens (consisting of only five tergites) referred to A. perornatus is unusually large for an Adelophthalmus and shows ornamentation more similar to that seen in the family Hibbertopteridae than in Adelophthalmus.
Adelophthalmus piussii	Lamsdell, Simonetto & Selden	2013	Valid	4 cm	Late Carboniferous	A. piussii is unique within Adelophthalmus in possessing a median furrow (raised structure through the center of the carapace) on its prosoma and in the corners of the carapace not being expanded. Its first tergite has an almost identical morphology as that possessed by A. wilsoni.
Adelophthalmus pruvosti	Kjellesvig-Waering	1948	Valid Possible synonym of A. imhofi	? cm	Moscovian (Carboniferous)	Originally described as a species of the synonymized genus Lepidoderma.
Adelophthalmus pyrrhae	Lamsdell et al.	2020	Valid	7 cm	Tournaisian (Carboniferous)	A. pyrrhae had in its second to fifth appendages a pair of ventrodistal spines on each podomere. Furthermore, it had epimera in its postabdomen and the first segment did not have any lateral reduction. This suggests that A. pyrrhae was similar to A. mansfieldi and A. mazonensis.
Adelophthalmus raniceps	Goldenberg	1873	Uncertain	? cm	Moscovian (Carboniferous)	Originally described as a species of Polyzosternites.
Adelophthalmus sellardsi	Dunbar	1924	Valid Possible synonym of A. imhofi	? cm	Artinskian (Permian)	Originally described as a species of the synonymized genus Anthraconectes. A. sellardsi seems to resemble A. mansfieldi, differing in a slightly longer and more rounded carapace in A. mansfieldi. Other related species such as A. chinensis has a shorter and rounder carapace than A. sellardsi, as well as prominent epimeras in the preabdomen unlike the latter.
Adelophthalmus sievertsi	Størmer	1969	Valid	18 cm	Emsian (Devonian)	Originally described as a species of Rhenopterus. A. sievertsi is, despite its early age, most similar to late Carboniferous and Permian species such as A. sellardsi and A. luceroensis. The species can be differentiated from others in the genus by its relatively broad carapace, a short podomere 7 on the swimming legs and rows of tubercles along the posterior edges of the carapace and opisthosomal segments.
Adelophthalmus waterstoni	Tetlie et al.	2004	Valid	15 cm	Frasnian (Devonian)	Originally described as a species of Rhenopterus. A poorly known species based on a single fossil consisting of a series of fragmentary segments. Similar to A. sievertsi, but differing in arrangement of tubercles on the segments.
Adelophthalmus wilsoni	Woodward	1888	Valid Possible synonym of A. imhofi	20 cm	Moscovian (Carboniferous)	Originally described as a species of Eurypterus. The only known specimen consists of six body segments. These segments possess markings and spikes alongside the abdomen similar to A. mansfieldi. The spikes of A. wilsoni are less pointed than those of A. mansfieldi.
Adelophthalmus zadrai	Přibyl	1952	Valid Possible synonym of A. imhofi	15 cm	Bashkirian (Carboniferous)	The abdominal spikes of A. zadrai are more angular in comparison to other species, such as A. granosus (where they are more rounded). Other differences between A. zadrai and the type species is the ornamentation of A. zadrai being coarser and A. zadrai being markedly more slender in shape.

In a 2025 eurypterid monograph, James Lamsdell retained 30 of these species as valid. Lamsdell classified A. dubius as a synonym of A. kamyshtensis, and reclassified A. lohesti and A. perornatus as hibbertopterids, in the genera Dunsopterus and Glyptoscorpius, respectively.

== History of research ==
=== Earliest discoveries ===
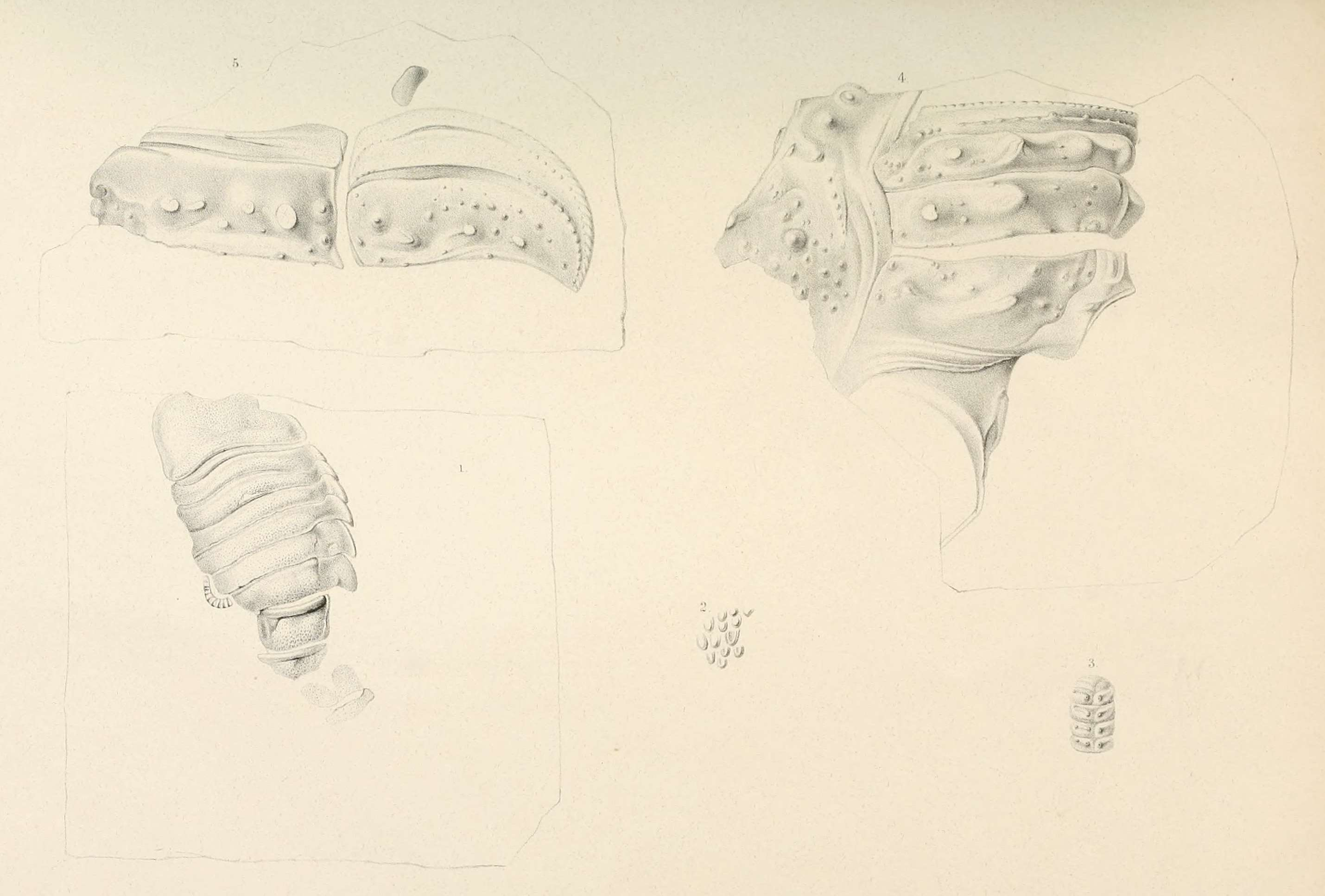
The type specimen of A. granosus, MB.A. 890, as illustrated in its original description by Hermann Jordan and Hermann von Meyer in 1854. The apparently eyeless carapace can be seen in the bottom-left illustration.

The first specimen of Adelophthalmus to be discovered was excavated in 1851 by German paleontologist Hermann Jordan in a railway shaft at Jägersfreude, near Saarbrücken in Germany. This specimen was described three years later in 1854 in the work Ueber die Crustaceen der Steinkohlenformation von Saarbrücken ("Of the crustaceans of the coal formation of Saarbrücken"), written by Jordan and Hermann von Meyer and featuring descriptions of several other arthropod taxa. The fossil was immediately recognized by Jordan as that of a eurypterid, with both the overall shape and form and the individual parts (particularly the head and the appendages) being very similar to those of Eurypterus which had been described in the United States in 1825, 29 years earlier. Among the differences noted between the specimens were the smaller size and later age of the Saarbrücken fossil and what Jordan and von Meyer perceived to be a complete lack of eyes.

Since the preserved carapace had no indication of there ever having been any eyes present, Jordan and von Meyer assumed that the animal would have been completely eyeless in life, with the original description of the fossil citing several cases in which eyeless forms occur in arthropod groups otherwise possessing eyes (such as in crustaceans and trilobites). This apparent eyelessness prompted the choice of name, Adelophthalmus, meaning "no obvious eye". The species name, granosus, is derived from the Latin grānōsus ("grainy" or "full of grains"), referring to the state of the fossil preservation having given some of the fossils a grainy texture. The type specimen, to this day the only specimen referred to A. granosus, is today held in the arthropod paleontology collections of the Natural History Museum of Berlin under the specimen number MB.A. 890.

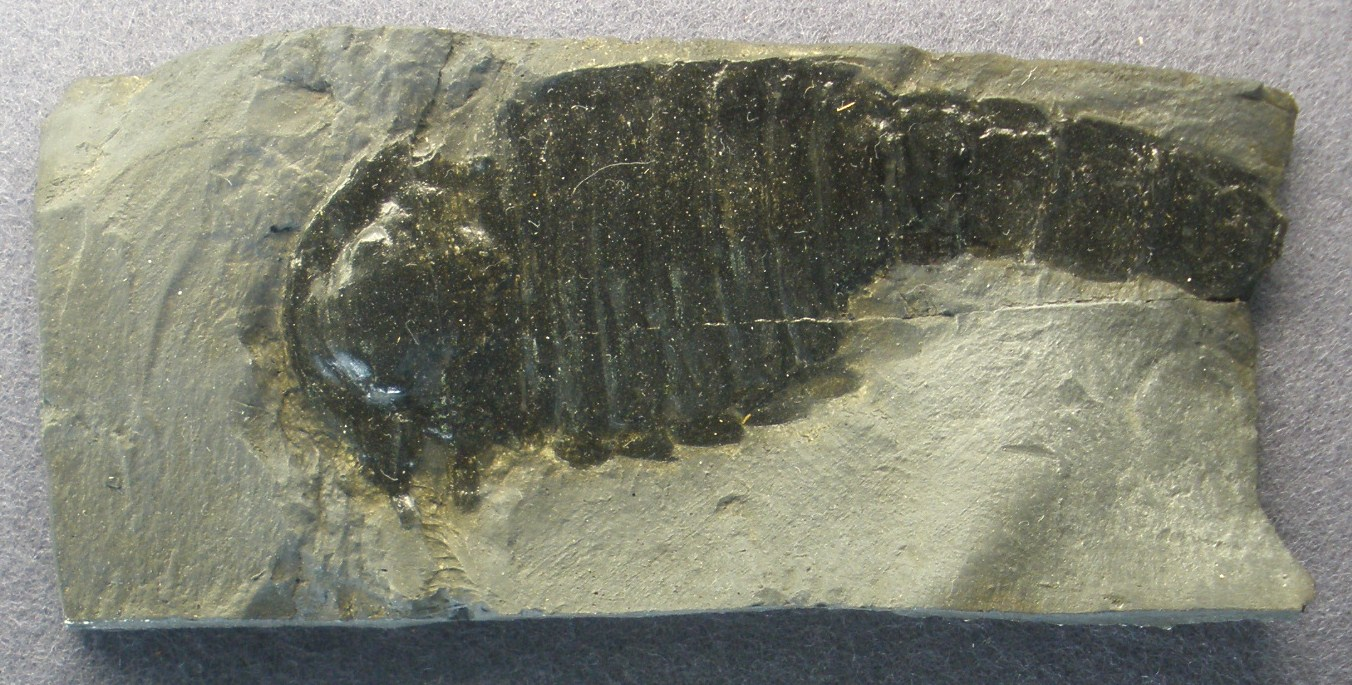
Fossil of A. imhofi, formerly considered to be the type species of the genus Lepidoderma, exhibited at the Senckenberg Museum of Frankfurt.

Though modern researchers tend to treat the assumed eyelessness as a preservational artifact and not a feature that A. granosus would have had in life, this issue was not resolved immediately which made the naming of subsequently discovered species confusing and problematic. Lepidoderma imhofi, named in 1855 from Carboniferous-age deposits in Germany, shows definite eyes. The descriptor, Austrian paleontologist August Emanuel von Reuss, noted that Lepidoderma likely was synonymous with Adelophthalmus, but ignored the rules of taxonomical priority and used his younger name due to it being based on material that he considered to be better preserved. The name Lepidoderma derives from the Latin lepidus ("elegant" or "fine") and Ancient Greek δέρμα (ðerma, "skin").

In 1868, American paleontologists Fielding Bradford Meek and Amos Henry Worthen described Anthraconectes mazonensis, Anthraconectes being designated a subgenus of Eurypterus, based on fossils recovered in Carboniferous-age deposits at Mazon Creek in Illinois (the first species to be described from North America). After examining the Adelophthalmus type specimen in 1934, German paleontologist Paul Guthörl remarked that Anthraconectes and Adelophthalmus were so similar that they would have been synonyms had Adelophthalmus possessed eyes. The name Polyzosternites was coined by German paleontologist Friedrich Goldenberg (who also named the species Polyzosternites raniceps, today recognized as A. raniceps) in 1873 to replace the name Adelophthalmus in regards to specimens described after the type specimen in the belief that the type of Adelophthalmus represented the fossil remains of a cockroach. Glyptoscorpius was erected to include some fossils from the Carboniferous of Scotland, including the species G. perornatus (designated as type, the type specimen consisting of only five tergites), G. caledonicus and G. kidstoni, by British geologist Ben Peach in 1882. Glyptoscorpius would for a long time erroneously be considered to represent the fossil remains of a scorpion and not a eurypterid.

The second species to be described from North America was A. pennsylvanicus (as Eurypterus pennsylvanicus), by Meek and Worthen from the coal-measures of Venango County, Pennsylvania in 1877. That same year, American paleontologist James Hall described the species A. mansfieldi (under the name Eurypterus (Dolichopterus) mansfieldi) based on fossils recovered in Cannelton, Pennsylvania. In 1888, Hall described the species A. approximatus (as Eurypterus approximatus) together with American paleontologist John Mason Clarke based on fossils also recovered from Pennsylvania.

The English geologist Henry Woodward described the species Eurypterus wilsoni (=Adelophthalmus wilsoni) in 1888 based on a fossil recovered by an Edward Wilson of the Bristol Museum, naming the species in his honor. The only known specimen is composed of six body segments and Woodward noted that naming the species may have been slightly premature. He noted that the specimen possessed markings and spikes running alongside the abdomen in a similar way to A. mansfieldi (then classified as Eurypterus mansfieldi).

Portuguese paleontologist Pereira de Lima described the species Eurypterus douvillei (today seen as Adelophthalmus douvillei) in 1890 based on fossils from Bussaco in Portugal.

=== Twentieth century ===
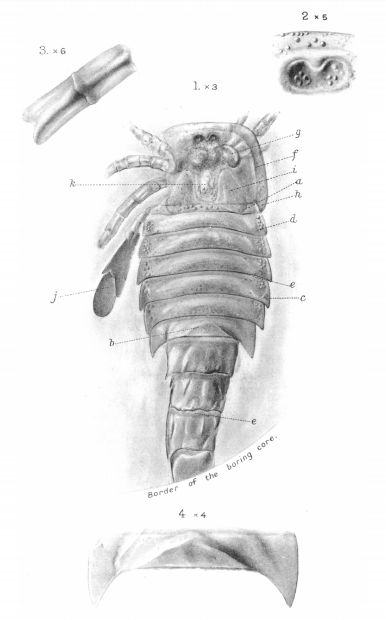
Drawing of the type specimen of A. dumonti from its 1915 description (as Eurypterus dumonti).

In 1907, Henry Woodward described Eurypterus moyseyi (today recognized as Adelophthalmus moyseyi) based on fossils recovered from Radstock, Somerset in England. Woodward compared the singular specimen of E. moyseyi to fossil specimens of A. mansfieldi from America, finding the spikes along the abdomen very similar, though noted that they were less prominent in E. moyseyi. Woodward described very large fossil specimens, the carapace alone measuring 21 cm (8.3 in) and the seven associated body segments measuring an additional 25 cm (9.8) together. Despite this, the latest available size estimates for A. moyseyi put the species at 12 cm (4.7 in) in length.

A. nebraskensis was described as Eurypterus (Anthraconectes) nebraskensis in 1914 by American geologist Erwin H. Barbour based on fossils recovered in Nebraska, USA. The species was described alongside other fossils from the associated sediments, which helped reinforce the idea as Adelophthalmus (or Anthraconectes) as a freshwater animal.

The species A. dumonti, Carboniferous in age, was described by Belgian paleontologist Xavier Stainier in 1915 as Eurypterus dumonti. The type specimen, a relatively complete fossil measuring just 3.3 centimetres (1.3 in) in length, was discovered through boring at a new coalfield in Campine, northern Belgium. Though the fossil had been slightly damaged, including the entire counterpart being fragmented, owing to careless usage of hammers and diamond bores during excavation, the fossil could nevertheless be studied in detail and compared to known eurypterid species. As Stainier considered every known Carboniferous eurypterid to be part of the genus Eurypterus (among them several species today recognized as Adelophthalmus, such as the type species A. granosus, A. imhofi and A. pennsylvanicus), he classified the new Belgian eurypterid in that genus as well. He did note that the new species was very similar to species such as E. pennsylvanicus and especially E. mansfieldi (both seen as species of Adelophthalmus today). The species name dumonti honors the prominent Belgian geologist André Dumont.

The American geologist Amadeus William Grabau described the species Anthraconectes chinensis in 1920, based on fossils discovered in Zhaozezhuang, China.

Canadian geologist Walter A. Bell described the species A. bradorensis in 1922 (as a species of Anthraconectes) based on a single fossil recovered in New Campbelton in the Municipality of the County of Victoria, Canada, referring it to the genus due to similarities with the Scottish A. kidstoni and the American A. mansfieldi.

1924 saw the description of the species Anthraconectes sellardsi by American paleontologist Carl Owen Dunbar based on two incomplete fossils and few other small fragments from Elmo in Kansas. The first specimen preserves the carapace and the first four tergites of the preabdomen, while the second preserves five preabdominal and three postabdominal tergites; this specimen represents twice the size of the first one.

The species A. oklahomensis was described by American paleontologist Carl E. Decker in 1938 based on Permian-age fossils in Oklahoma. Since the A. oklahomensis specimen was virtually identical to specimens of A. sellardsi of similar age and a similar stratigraphical horizon in Kansas, A. oklahomensis was designated a junior synonym of A. sellardsi by American geologist Carl Colton Branson, with the support of Decker, in 1959.

The type specimen of A. zadrai, MB.A. 889, was collected in the Czech Republic in 1930 or 1931 and first mentioned in a manuscript by French Carboniferous worker Pierre Pruvost, who dubbed it "Eurypterus (Anthraconectes) Zadrai", but he did not formally describe the specimen or taxon. Pruvost had previous experience with the genus, having described the species Anthraconectes cambieri in 1930 based on fossils from Charleroi, Belgium. A. zadrai was first described formally in 1952 as Adelophthalmus zadrai, at a point in time when the type specimen was seemingly lost. The specimen was rediscovered in Berlin under a different species name based on the original collector of the fossil (Dr. Palisa) and without any designation of it representing a type specimen. Pruvost was also honored through the naming of A. pruvosti (described as Lepidoderma pruvosti by Norwegian paleontologist Erik N. Kjellesvig-Waering in 1948 based on fossils discovered in Lens, France).

1933 saw Ukrainian paleontologist Boris Isidorovich Chernyshev describe the species A. carbonarius based in one single specimen from the Donets in Ukraine. A new expedition in 2012 carried out by Russian paleontologist Evgeniy S. Shpinev and others in the respectively Russian and Ukrainian localities of Kakichev and Lomuvatka brought a number of well-preserved, presumably juvenile, fossils of A. carbonarius. The exact identification of these fossils is not possible, but they are identified as A. carbonarius since there are no features showing the opposite. Another Belgian species, A. corneti, was described by Pruvost in 1939 based on fossils from Quaregnon.

All synonymous genera; Anthraconectes, Glyptoscorpius, Lepidoderma and Polyzosternites, were subsumed into Adelophthalmus in studies during the middle twentieth century, notably that of Belgian paleontologist Fredrik Herman van Oyen (1956). Though most authors assign all described species to Adelophthalmus, some, such as van Oyen in 1956, have considered Anthraconectes to potentially represent a distinct genus, citing that scorpions with similar dorsal anatomies can be quite different ventrally and that the same could be true for the Carboniferous Adelophthalmus where the ventral morphology is not yet known. A genus Anthraconectes of this nature would be problematic due to its classification depending on the preservational state of any given specimen.

A. asturica was described as Lepidoderma asturica by Spanish paleontologist Bermudo Meléndez in 1971 based on fossils from d'Ablana in Spain.

The species A. luceroensis was described by American paleontologists Barry S. Kues and Kenneth K. Kietzke in 1981 based on 150 fossil specimens recovered from the Madera Formation of New Mexico. The large amount of specimens recovered, representing individuals at various stages of development and ontogeny, allowed detailed studies to be performed on the ontogeny and intraspecific variation within Adelophthalmus.

American paleontologist Roy E. Plotnick referred a species of Eurypterus, E. lohesti (first described in 1889) to Adelophthalmus in 1983 (as A. lohesti), but this classification is questionable as the morphology of the A. lohesti specimen is not consistent with that otherwise known of Adelophthalmus. The differences include A. lohesti having larger eyes, a wider carapace and what could possible by a median ridge on the carapace.

=== Twenty-first century ===
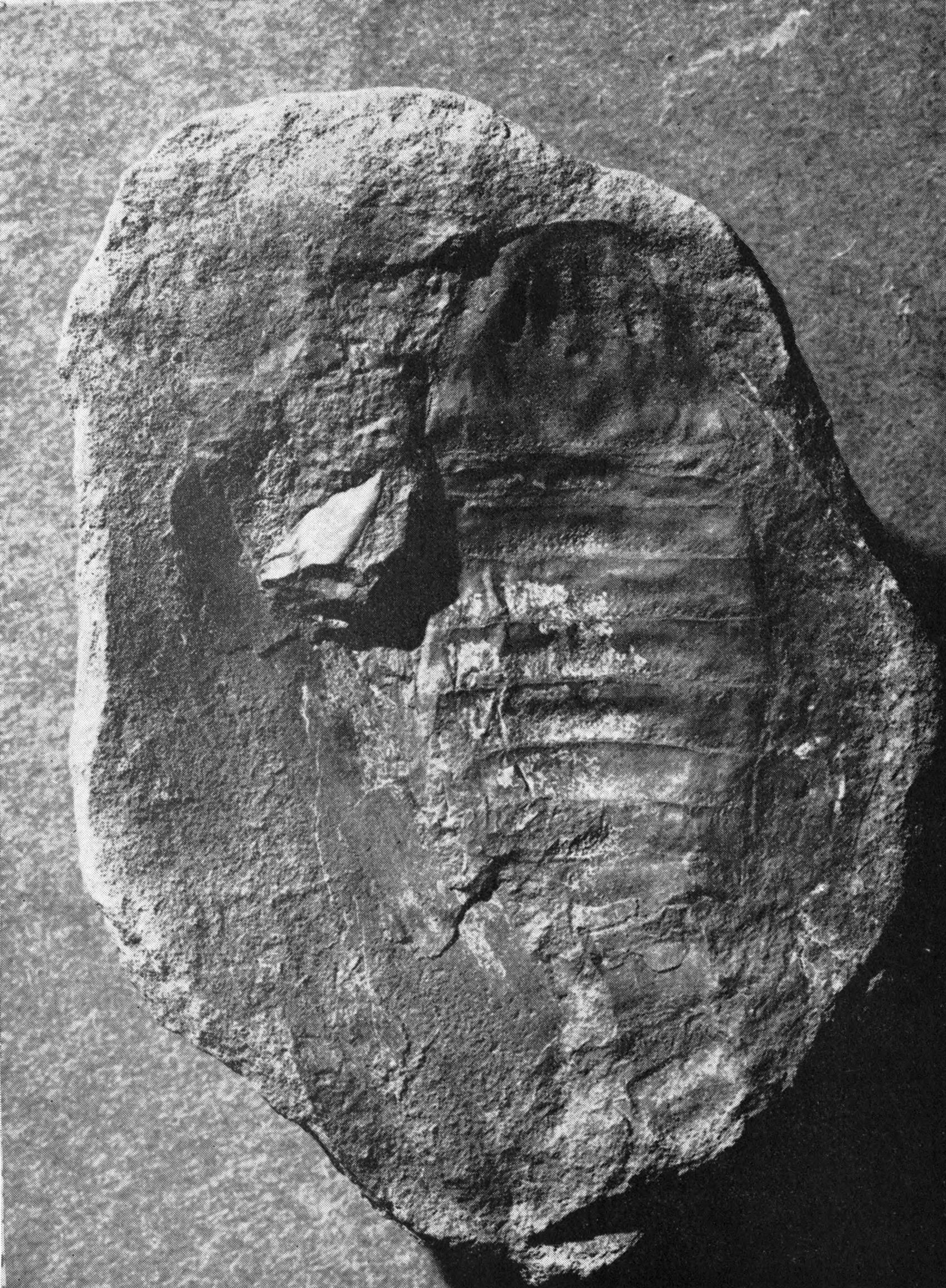
Fossil of A. mazonensis.

In 2004, the German paleontologist Markus Poschmann referred the species A. sievertsi, first described as part of the genus Rhenopterus by Norwegian paleontologist Leif Størmer in 1969 based on fossil remains from the Devonian Klerf Formation in Germany, to the genus. Poschmann also referred the species Rhenopterus waterstoni (described earlier in 2004 based on the singular specimen BMNH In 60174 from the Late Devonian of Australia) to Adelophthalmus. This species had previously not been assigned to the genus despite clear similarities to other species of Adelophthalmus partly due to there previously not being any solid evidence for the presence of Adelophthalmus as early as the Devonian.

A. irinae was described in 2006 based on a fossil specimens (including the holotype, a prosoma, "head", with the specimen number PIN no. 5109/4) collected by the Krasnoyarsk Geological Expedition near Sakhapta, a village in the Nazarovsky District of the Krasnoyarsk Region of Russia. The fossils, from the Tournaisian Solomennyi Stan Formation, could confidently be assigned to Adelophthalmus based on their scalelike ornamentation, the position of their eyes and the shape of the carapace shortly after their excavation. The species is the first species of Adelophthalmus to be described from Russia and the first ever Carboniferous eurypterid known from the country. It is also one of few Carboniferous eurypterids found within the territory of the former Soviet Union, the only others being A. carbonarius from Ukraine and Unionopterus from Kazakhstan.

Shpinev described two new species of Adelophthalmus in 2012; A. kamyshtensis and A. dubius (the name deriving from the Latin dubius = "doubtful"), both based on fossils originally collected by Russian geologist Yuriy Fedorovich Pogonya-Stefanovich in 1960 in deposits 3 km southeast of the village of Kamyshta (which lent its name to A. kamyshtensis) of the Republic of Khakassia, Russia and now housed at the Borissiak Paleontological Institute. Despite how poorly preserved these fossils are, several features (notably the parabolic carapace and the presence of spikes along the abdomen) place both species within Adelophthalmus.

In 2013, A. piussii became the first eurypterid to be described from Italy. The specimen (specimen number MFSNgp 31681, housed at the Museo Friulano di Storia Naturale in Udine) was collected in the gravel bank of a small creek near the greater Bombaso creek, north of the village of Pontebba and consists of a carapace and seven opisthosomal segments on a large block of sandstone. The name of the species, piussii, honors the collector of the type specimen, Stefano Piussi.

In 2018, Shpinev and Russian researcher A. N. Filimonov described a new species named A. khakassicus based in many well-preserved specimens. Found in the Ilemorovskaya Formation of Khakassia (hence the name) in 2014 by Filimonov, it represents the biggest species of the genus. The holotype, PM TGU 168/108, is composed of parts of the metasoma and a complete telson, with several other known paratypes. As A. khakassicus is known from similar stratigraphic levels to those of A. kamyshtensis and A. dubius, it has been suggested that these three species could represent synonyms.

In 2020, Lamsdell, Victoria E. McCoy, Opal A. Perron-Felle and Melanie J. Hopkins described a new species of Adelophthalmus from the Tournaisian stage of (most likely) the Lydiennes Formation, in France. Its only known specimen, GLAHM A23113, is a nearly complete body only lacking the telson and preserved in phosphatic nodules. For this reason, it was called Adelophthalmus pyrrhae, named after Pyrrha of Thessaly, a figure from Greek mythology who, together with her husband Deucalion, threw stones that transformed into babies to repopulate the world. The good preservation of A. pyrrhae allowed researchers to examine parts of its respiratory system, and after their study it was confirmed that even if they had a mostly aquatic lifestyle, the eurypterids could venture on to land for long periods.

== Evolutionary history ==
=== Devonian ===
Map of the Devonian landmass of Euramerica, composed of the once individual continents Baltica, Laurentia and Avalonia.

The adelophthalmids likely first appeared in the waters of the continent Baltica in the Late Silurian, being a part of a rapid diversification of swimming eurypterids (suborder Eurypterina) throughout the Silurian. Baltica would later collide with the continents Avalonia and Laurentia and form the landmass Euramerica, where most of basal adelophthalmid evolution took place in the Early Devonian. The earliest known species of Adelophthalmus is A. sievertsi from Early Devonian (Emsian) deposits of the Klerf Formation in Wilwerath (in the Rhineland-Palatinate), Germany, then part of Avalonia within Euramerica. A. sievertsi lived in near-shore environments, typically a varied and unstable habitat, which indicates that Adelophthalmus was eurytopic (capable of surviving in a wide range of environments).

Three other species from the Middle Devonian, A. khakassicus, A. kamyshtensis and A. dubius, are the earliest known species of Adelophthalmus from outside Europe, fossils of the three having been recovered from Khakassia in Russia. By the Late Devonian, Adelophthalmus had already become widespread, with the species A. waterstoni having been recovered from deposits of Frasnian (~382.2 to 372.2 million years old) age in the Gogo Formation of Western Australia, the only eurypterid with the exception of Acutiramus and Pterygotus known from the continent.

The only other species of Adelophthalmus known from the Devonian is the Famennian (latest Devonian) A. lohesti, known from fossil deposits at Pont de Bonne in Liège, Belgium. Alongside a Famennian species of Hibbertopterus, H. dewalquei, A. lohesti represents the oldest known eurypterid hitherto discovered in Belgium. A. lohesti is however represented by a single fragmentary specimen whose identification as Adelophthalmus or even eurypterine at large is questionable, with it possibly representing a stylonurid eurypterid instead. Devonian specimens of Adelophthalmus have allegedly also been recovered from Siberia, which would mean that the range of the genus included water around all then existing continents.

The eurypterids were one of the groups most heavily affected by the Late Devonian extinction event, following a major decline in diversity during the Early Devonian, eurypterids were rare in marine environments by the Late Devonian. Of the 16 eurypterid families that had been alive at the beginning of the Devonian, only three persisted into the Carboniferous. All of these were non-marine groups. Whilst the suborder Stylonurina was relatively unscathed, adapting new strategies (such as sweep-feeding) to avoid competition, and came to diversify once more in the Carboniferous, the Eurypterina was rendered almost completely extinct, Adelophthalmus becoming the sole survivor of the entire suborder.

=== Carboniferous ===
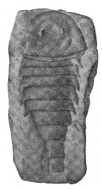
Fossil of A. approximatus.

Following the extinction of all other swimming eurypterids in the Devonian, Adelophthalmus became the most common of all eurypterids of the late Paleozoic, existing in far greater number than the surviving members of the Stylonurina, both in terms of the number of individuals and the number of species. Adelophthalmus experienced a rapid diversification through the Carboniferous, with 23 of its 33 species having been described from the Carboniferous alone, and reached its peak diversity in the Late Carboniferous. This diversification did not lead to the evolution of any new genera–Adelophthalmus remained the only genus of eurypterine eurypterids until the extinction of the group.

Already widespread and represented around all major landmasses in the Late Devonian, the amalgamation of Pangaea into a global supercontinent during the Carboniferous and Permian would allow the able swimmer Adelophthalmus to gain an almost worldwide distribution, with Carboniferous-age fossils of Adelophthalmus having been recovered from the United States, Spain, Belgium, Ukraine, China, Germany, the Czech Republic, Russia, England, Wales, Scotland, France and Italy.

The Early Carboniferous saw the appearance of a few new species, notably A. approximatus, the earliest record of Adelophthalmus in North America (although this species may have occurred as early as the Famennian stage, the last stage of the Devonian). The genus also spread to modern day Scotland (A. perornatus recovered from fossil deposits of Early Carboniferous age in Glencartholm) and Asia (the Tournaisian-age A. irinae known from fossil deposits near Krasnoyarsk, Russia). The appearance of A. irinae is particularly notable as it represents the hitherto only known Carboniferous eurypterid in Russia. A. pyrrhae discovered in France is also known from this time. The Late Carboniferous would see the appearance of several more species in various places around the world. During the Bashkirian stage (from 323.2 to 315.2 million years ago), two species appeared in Belgium, A. cambieri from Charleroi and A. corneti from Quaregnon, and a third species, A. zadrai has been reported from deposits of Bashkirian age in Moravo-Silesia of the Czech Republic.

The abundance of the bivalve Anthracomya suggests strong evidence of freshwater deposition in the habitat of A. bradorensis, a Radstockian (Upper Westphalian) species from Canada.

The Moscovian stage (from 315.2 to 307 million years ago) saw the appearance of several new species, including the two German species A. raniceps and A. granosus, both from Saarbrücken. Further Moscovian-age species include a variety of Adelophthalmus from Europe and North America; A. asturica from d’Ablana, Spain, A. kidstoni from Radstock, England, A. imhofi from Vlkhys, Czech Republic, A. mazonensis from Illinois, USA, A. moyseyi from Blaengarw, Wales, A. pennsylvanicus from Pennsylvania, USA, A. pruvosti from Lens, France, A. wilsoni from Radstock, England and A. dumonti from Mechelen-sur-Meuse, Belgium. The very latest Carboniferous and early Permian would see the appearance of A. mansfieldi in Pennsylvania, USA and A. chinensis from Zhaozezhuang, China. Furthermore, the species A. piussii has been recovered from Late Carboniferous deposits in the Carnic Alps of Italy, the first and hitherto only eurypterid known from the country.

=== Permian ===
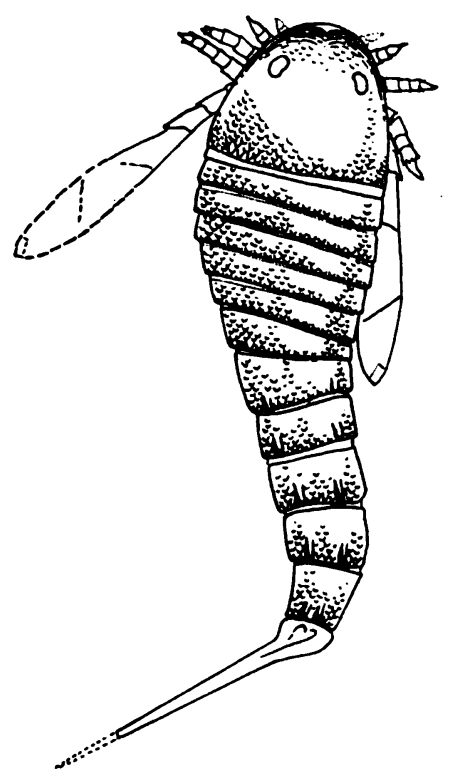
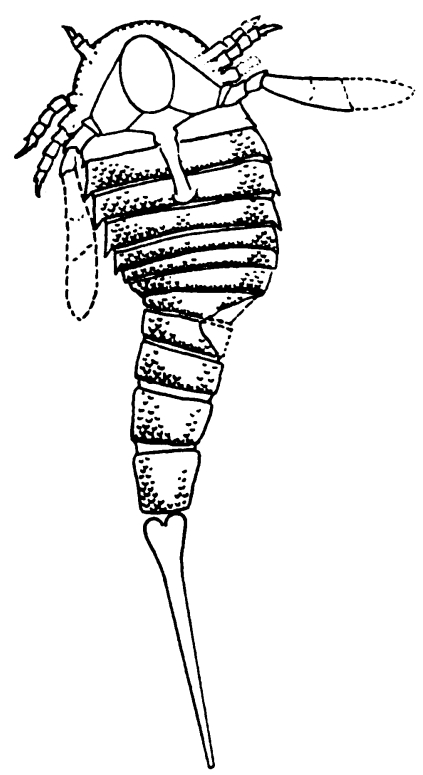
Drawings of the ventral and dorsal sides of fossils of A. nebraskensis.

The Permian fossil record of Adelophthalmus includes five species, all of which were confined to the Early Permian. The first stage of the period, the Asselian (from 298.9 to 295 million years ago), saw the appearance of A. luceroensis in New Mexico, USA, A. douvillei in Bussaco, Portugal and the continued survival of the Carboniferous Chinese species A. chinensis. A. douvillei lasted until the subsequent stage, the Sakmarian (from 295 to 290.1 million years ago), which also saw the appearance of A. nebraskensis in Nebraska, USA. A. nebraskensis is known to have lived in a freshwater environment, its fossil being found in association with fossils of land plants. The youngest described species is A. sellardsi, known from the Artinskian (290.1 to 283.5 million years ago) stage of Elmo in Kansas, USA.

Out of all known species of Adelophthalmus, the final stragglers of the genus (A. luceroensis and A. sellardsi) were most similar to the very earliest known species, A. sievertsi, despite being separated by a timespan of more than a hundred million years. The similarities are likely due to a generalized, and not a specialized, ecological niche. This morphological conservatism in Adelophthalmus suggests that the genus became bradytelic, evolving at a slower rate than the standard rate among eurypterids. Typically, bradytelic organisms have a broad geographical spread, something that was seen in Adelophthalmus over the course of the late Devonian and Carboniferous.

As with many other species of Adelophthalmus, A. luceroensis appears to have lived in environments of brackish to fresh water on a deltaic plain adjacent to a coastal plain. Climate conditions favorable for the spread and maintenance of such environments were optimal during the Late Carboniferous and Early Permian, with Adelopthalmus being widespread and numerous in these times. In most of the locations Adelophthalmus was present it appears to have been similar ecologically.

Though habitats of this kind were many, widespread and ecologically stable for a time in the early Permian, they would turn out to be delicate. A changing climate during the Permian altered depositional and vegetation patterns across the northern hemisphere, which drastically affected previously widespread environments such as the signature Carboniferous coal forests as well as brackish and fresh water habitats. As their habitat vanished, Adelophthalmus dwindled in number. Whilst some stylonurine eurypterids (Hastimima and Campylocephalus) that occupied niches outside of these habitats continued to survive for a time, Adelophthalmus, restricted to a rapidly disappearing type of environment, became extinct.

== Classification ==
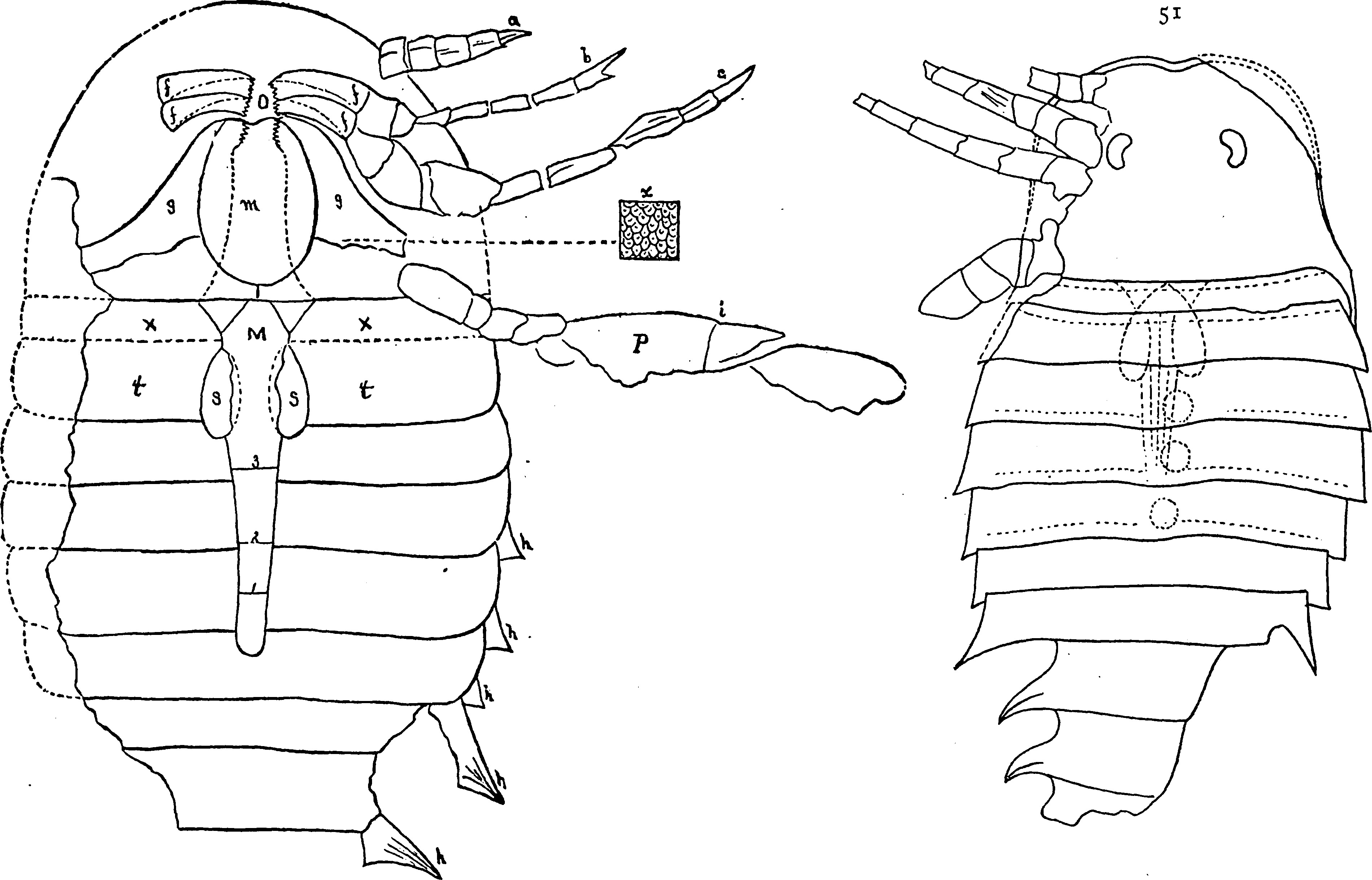
Line drawings depicting the top and bottom sides of a fossil of A. mazonensis.

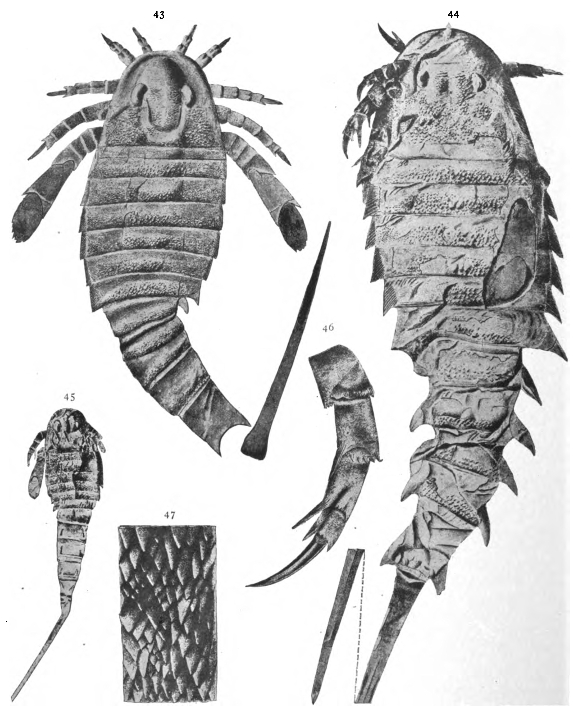
Fossils of A. mansfieldi.

Adelophthalmus is classified as part of (and lends its name to) the family Adelophthalmidae, the only family within the superfamily Adelophthalmoidea, alongside the genera Parahughmilleria, Nanahughmilleria, Bassipterus, Pittsfordipterus and Eysyslopterus. The cladogram below presents the inferred phylogenetic positions of most of the genera included in the three most derived superfamilies of the Eurypterina suborder of eurypterids (Adelophthalmoidea, Pterygotioidea and the waeringopteroids), as inferred by O. Erik Tetlie and Markus Poschmann in 2008, based on the results of a 2008 analysis specifically pertaining to the Adelophthalmoidea and a preceding 2004 analysis.

A close relationship between the three groups is confirmed partly due to basal members of all three groups, Orcanopterus, Eysyslopterus and Herefordopterus, sharing similar carapace shapes. Adelophthalmus being the most derived member of its family is confirmed by its swimming appendages being the thinnest of all included genera and by its eyes being the closest to the center of the carapace. In adelophthalmoids, eyes appear to get closer to the center of the carapace with every more derived genus, and even though eye position may reflect lifestyles and inhabited environments, they are also assumed to (particularly in this case, with a clear progression) include phylogenetically important information.

- Diploperculata
  - Waeringopteroidea
    - Orcanopterus
    - - Waeringopterus
      - Grossopterus
  - - Adelophthalmoidea
      - Eysyslopterus
      - - - Bassipterus
          - Pittsfordipterus
        - - Nanahughmilleria
          - - Parahughmilleria
            - Adelophthalmus
    - Pterygotioidea
      - Hughmilleria
      - - Herefordopterus
        - - Slimonia
          - - Erettopterus
            - - Pterygotus
              - - Acutiramus
                - Jaekelopterus

=== Internal phylogeny and monophyly ===
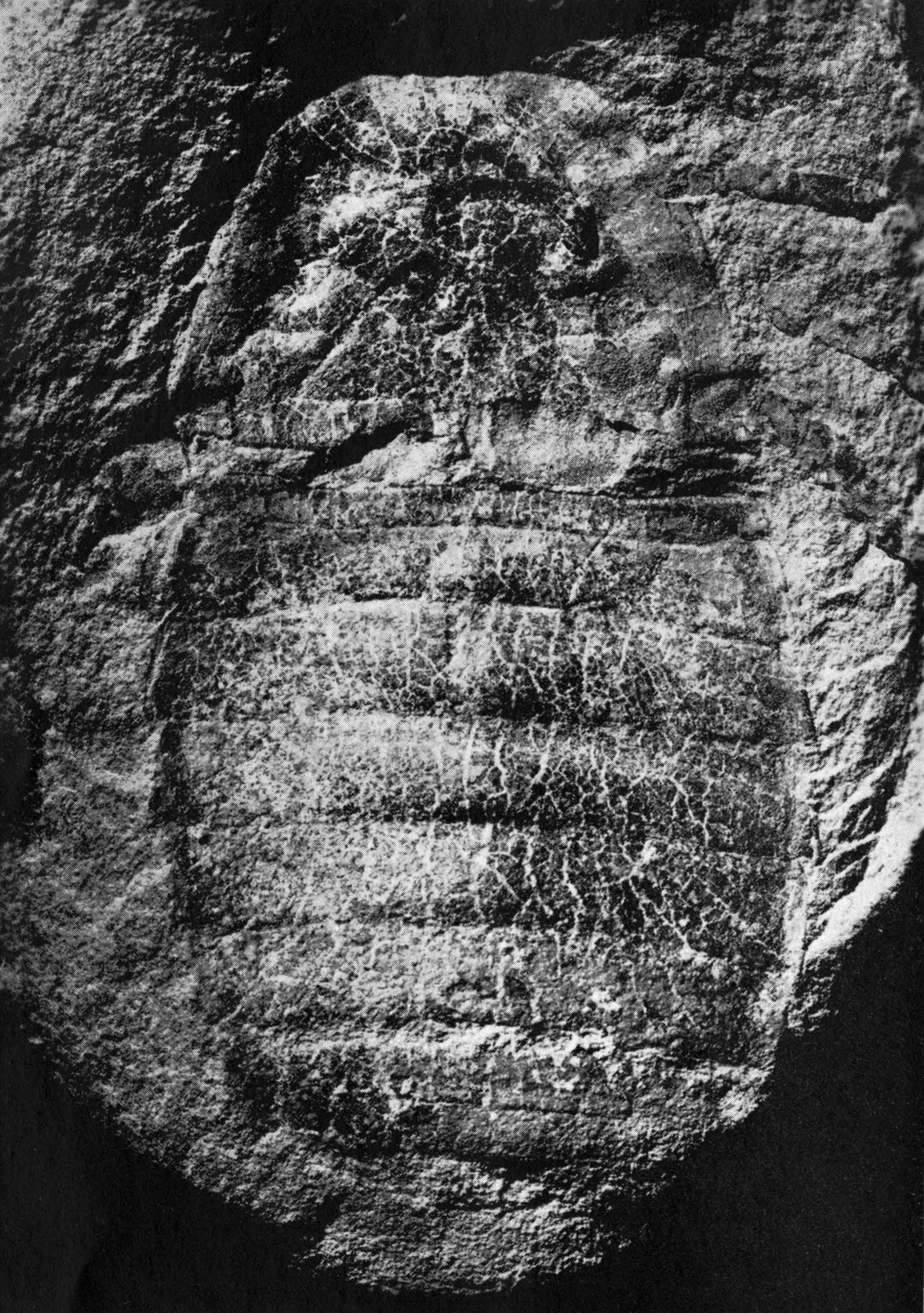
Fossil of A. mazonensis.

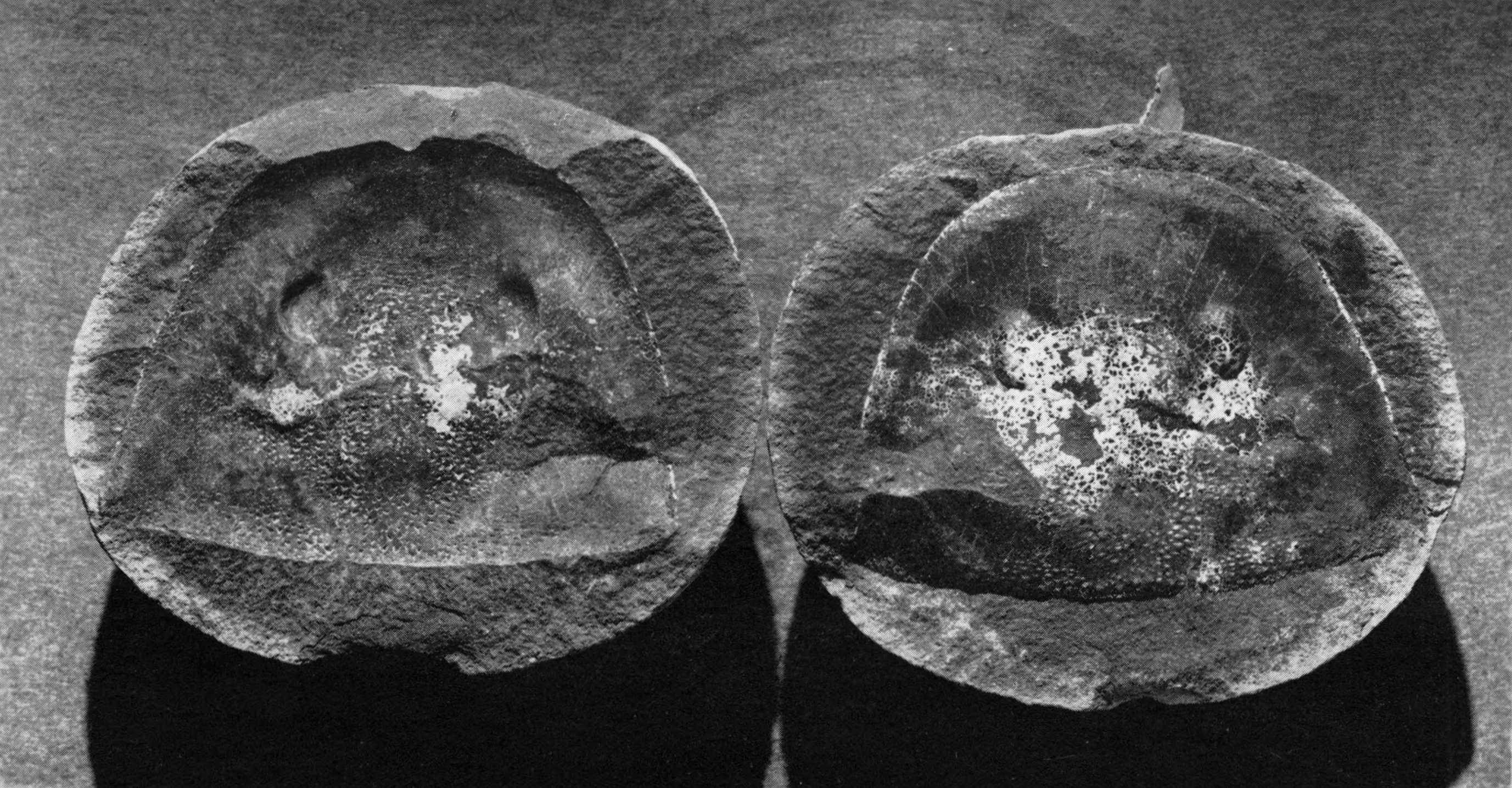
Fossil carapaces of A. mazonensis.

The internal phylogeny and relationships within Adelophthalmus are poorly known, owing to its long history and the large amount of species assigned to the genus, many based on fragmentary remains.

American paleontologist Victor P. Tollerton suggested in 1989 that some species of Adelophthalmus may be better placed within a new genus in the Slimonidae family of eurypterids, citing their lack of spines, however noted that the then presently available material of Adelophthalmus made it difficult to assess if the legs truly were non-spiniferous. A new genus for non-spiniferous species could be phylogenetically supported, but transferring the new genus to the Slimonidae based on the loss of a feature which seems to have been lost independently in the two groups is not in line with common practice.

The cladogram below displays the results of a phylogenetic analysis conducted by O. Erik Tetlie and Markus Poschmann in 2008, featuring seven species of Adelophthalmus and excluding other species on the grounds that they were too incompletely known. All characters were treated as unordered and given equal weight. Orcanopterus, part of a clade that also contains Grossopterus and Waeringopterus, was included in the analysis as an outgroup to polarise the characters.

The results of the analysis showed that all the genera featured (including Adelophthalmus), with the exception of Nanahughmilleria, where the basal species N. patteni was assigned to the new genus Eysyslopterus, were (or had the potential to be) monophyletic. The monophyly of Adelophthalmus was supported by several synapomorphies, including the presence of an anterior triangle on the carapace (the function of which is uncertain), a central circular area of the carapace being raised, the eyes being further away from the margin of the carapace than from the ocelli, an oval metastoma, a long telson and the presence of epimera on the preabdomen.

A. sievertsi was recovered as more basal than other species, which fits with it also being the earliest known species in the fossil record, mainly due to the broad swimming appendage being similar to the broad appendages of Parahughmilleria and Nanahughmilleria. All other species of Adelophthalmus where this appendage is known possess one that is thinner.

- Diploperculata
  - Orcanopterus (outgroup)
  - Adelophthalmidae
    - - Eysyslopterus patteni
      - - - Bassipterus virginicus
          - Pittsfordipterus phelpsae
    - - Nanahughmilleria norvegica
      - - Parahughmilleria hefteri
        - Adelophthalmus
          - A. sievertsi
          - - A. mansfieldi
            - - A. luceroensis
              - - A. mazonensis
                - - A. granosus
                  - - A. moyseyi
                    - A. dumonti

Life restoration of A. mazonensis

The analysis left out many fragmentary species of Adelophthalmus, as their character states could not be confidently taken into account, and Adelophthalmus in terms of all the species it is recognized as containing can thus not be fully confidently stated to be monophyletic, more fragmentary species need to be redescribed and more phylogenetic characters need to be confidently established before the status of the genus can be certain.

Adelophthalmus as it is currently understood may form a monophyletic, and thus phylogenetically valid, group, but that it likely suffers from an under-splitting at the genus level and over-splitting at the species level. It is possible that the large amount of species form two or more distinct clades that could be split into different genera. Though most of the species included in the genus appear to form a monophyletic group, some species have been suggested to represent species of other recognized genera, with A. dumonti supposedly being similar to the obscure Unionopterus in its supposed trapezoid carapace (a feature now known to be incorrect and based on an incorrect illustration) and the large A. perornatus showing ornamentation similar to the one seen in the Hibbertopteridae.

Many of the more fragmentary species could very well be synonyms of more well known species. In particular, A. imhofi was suggested by Fredrik Herman van Oyen in 1956 to possibly represent a senior synonym of many species, including A. zadrai, A. corneti, A. cambieri, A. pruvosti, A. bradorensis, A. kidstoni, A. wilsoni and A. sellardsi. Van Oyen's synonymizations were based on ratios of the carapace alone, ignoring other important phylogenetic features as well as possible taphonomic effects (defects produced during fossilization) on the fossils. Subsequent research has proven the validity of some species, now defined based on clear and distinguishing characteristics, including A. mazonensis, A. mansfieldi and A. moyseyi.

The precise taxonomy and status of the species within Adelophthalmus is an ongoing area of research, perhaps the most important question that remains unanswered is the exact relationship between the type species A. granosus and the second oldest described species, A. imhofi, which could have major implications for the internal phylogeny of the genus.

=== Status as a wastebasket taxon ===
Adelophthalmus contains a large amount of species (33 as of 2020, the largest amount of any eurypterid), is geographically widespread, named a long time ago (1854) and the nominate form of a higher taxon (lending its name to the family Adelopthalmidae and the superfamily Adelopthalmoidea), meeting every criterion to be dubbed a "wastebasket taxon", a taxon existing for the sole purpose of classifying organisms that do not fit elsewhere. According to James Lamsdell, "there is also a general habit not captured fully in the literature of assuming any undiagnostic small- to moderately sized eurypterid material in Carboniferous or Permian rocks is Adelophthalmus."

Additionally, most of the species referred to Adelophthalmus were described by authors who were not eurypterid specialists (since eurypterid researchers mostly concentrated their efforts on the more diverse pre-Carboniferous eurypterids) and most descriptions lack in comparisons with previously described species of the genus. As such, the differences between species are often trivial, perhaps partly resulting from that the first overview paper on the taxon was published only in 1948, at which point 26 species had already been described.

== Paleoecology ==
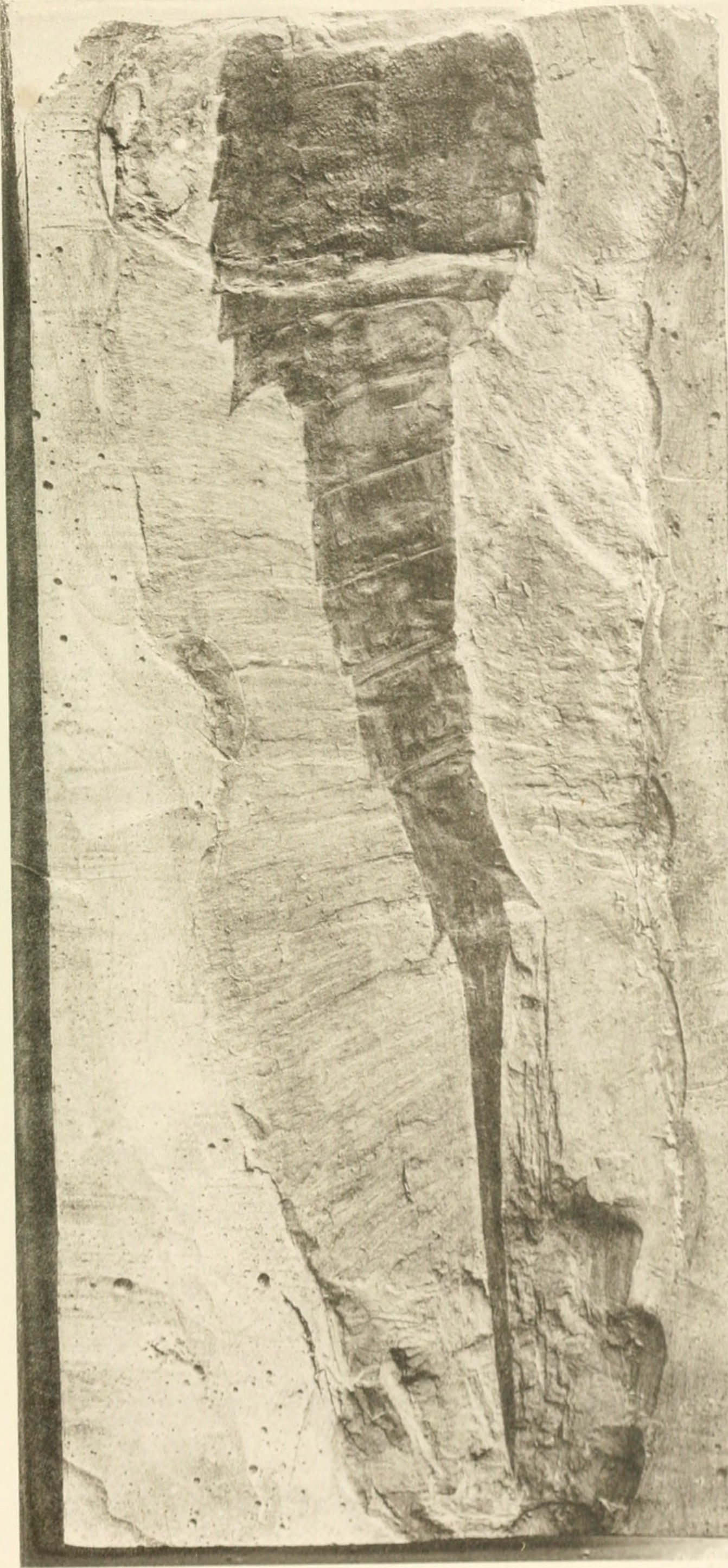
Fossil abdomen and telson of A. mansfieldi.

The Adelophthalmoidea as a whole mainly lived in environments near coastal habitats, with a preference for habitats with reduced salinity such as river deltas, estuaries or lagoons. Marine influences are often recorded from these habitats and the deposits carrying adelophthalmoid fossils, but typical marine index fossils (fossils that indicate a marine environment and ecosystem) are not found associated with the eurypterid remains. The occasional Adelophthalmus fossils found in obviously marine deposits, such as the Late Devonian Australian A. waterstoni, might have been transported from their original habitat. In the case of A. waterstoni this is seen as particularly likely as it is represented by a single specimen that is also the only eurypterid specimen collected from the formation in which it was found, the Gogo Formation of Western Australia.

In general, post-Devonian eurypterids are rare and occur in habitats of brackish or fresh water, having migrated from the marginal marine environments inhabited during the Silurian. The earliest adelophthalmoids, such as the Devonian Parahughmilleria hefteri, which are recovered in non-marine deposits such as in environments that were once brackish or estuarine habitats. The evolution of Adelophthalmus saw a shift from brackish environments to habitats dominated by fresh water. In habitats where both Parahughmilleria and early species of Adelophthalmus are found, such as in Early Devonian fossil sites in Germany where fossils of A. sievertsi have been discovered, Parahughmilleria are found in sections that are considerably more marginally marine than those sections inhabited by Adelophthalmus.

The largest presence of Adelophthalmus in freshwater habitats occurred in the Bashkirian and Moscovian stages of the Carboniferous, from which Adelophthalmus fossils are recovered in strata bearing coal (indicating a coal swamp environment) together with fossils of freshwater bivalves and terrestrial organisms. It is possible that these freshwater "conquests" are related to the diversification of the genus itself and the appearance of several new species during the Carboniferous, rather than reflecting a shift in the habitat preference of the genus as a whole. Indeed, these coal swamp Adelophthalmus seem to form a minority, with most species being confined to paralic or lowland basins in depositional environments with close connections to marginally marine habitats.

For instance, the latest surviving examples of Adelophthalmus in the Saar–Nahe Basin of Germany (Moscovian in age) are from a time in which the basin was either part of, or at the very least connected to, a western subsiding area and drainage of the basin was to the Paleo-Tethys Ocean, located 1,500 km (930 miles) southwards. With uplift in the south during the Pennsylvanian and Early Permian, drainage became routed to the Panthalassa Ocean to the north, which resulted in the basin being located 1,300 km (810 miles) further away from the ocean. In these younger deposits, Adelophthalmus is nowhere to be found, which indicates that a shift to an environment further away from the ocean caused the extinction of these populations, which indicates that several species needed some form of connection to habitats of marginally marine nature, even if they did not live in them.

Later fossil localities containing Adelophthalmus, from the Late Moscovian, the later Carboniferous and the Early Permian, show a larger presence in habitats with marine influence, particularly habitats of tidally influence estuarine environments. Despite Adelophthalmus spreading to fully freshwater environments, their conquests of these environments was apparently not as successful as that of other similar groups, for instance some Carboniferous xiphosurans of the Belinuridae family, that occurred in freshwater lakes and basins that completely lacked eurypterids.

=== Diet and predation ===
As Adelophthalmus in many ways represented the last of its kind, being the final eurypterid to possess swimming appendages, it did not exist in diverse eurypterid faunas such as the ones observed with genera during the Silurian or early Devonian. Instead, the brackish of fresh water environments typically inhabited by Adelophthalmus, such as the Early Permian Madera Formation in New Mexico (where fossils of A. luceroensis have been recovered) preserve other organisms, such as insects, branchiopods, ostracods, millipedes and spirorbid worms. The thin and long paddles of Adelophthalmus indicates that it was a good swimmer, though it is likely that it spent most of its time crawling in the mud. As the chelicerae (frontal appendages) of Adelophthalmus were small, it is most likely that it fed on small organisms, possibly in part the ostracods and branchiopods known from associated fossils. There is a noticeable lack of insects in the fossil beds with dense plant fossils, where they should be more common, and a surprising abundance in fossil beds with few eurypterids, possibly indicating that Adelophthalmus fed on insects that had fallen into the water, hindering these from being preserved as fossils.

The localities in which Adelophthalmus have been preserved in the Madera Formation are all part of the Red Tanks Member, which does not preserve any known organisms that would have been capable of preying on Adelophthalmus. It is however likely that various predatory fish, amphibians and early reptiles known to have been present at the time would have preyed upon the small eurypterids. Both fish and amphibians are known from similar environments of the same age in the nearby Manzanita Mountains.

=== Respiration ===
Through X-ray microtomography imaging, researchers have been able to observe in detail the structure of the respiratory organs of the only known specimen of A. pyrrhae. A phosphate nodule on the ventral side of the animal is split in a manner in which the branchial chamber (gill tract) is visible. This uncovers four pairs of book gills (external gills arranged like the pages of a book), although they were probably five, as in xiphosurans. These are oriented horizontally and all of them but the ones from the sixth segment are fragmentary. There, they are oval in shape, attached near the midline of the body and consist of six lamellae. The number of lamellae in the other anterior segments is thought to have been higher, as indicated by some fragments and a specimen of Onychopterella augusti that had 45 lamellae in each of its four pairs of book gills from the second to fifth segments. Onychopterella's book gills, however, were vertically oriented. This and a fossil of the xiphosuran Tachypleus syriacus suggest that the book gills of A. pyrrhae underwent a taphonomic deformation and that they were originally vertically oriented as well.

The dorsal surface of each lamellae is covered by regularly spaced pillar-shaped trabeculae located between each lamellae, leaving a space filled with hemolymph (a fluid found in arthropods, analogous to the blood of vertebrates) in each. Trabeculae are commonly found in arachnids with lungs and represent a terrestrial adaptation to breathe air. They prevent the lamellae from sticking together and eliminating the space between them, which would suffocate the organism. Therefore, the presence of trabeculae in A. pyrrhae indicates that eurypterids were able breathe in terrestrial environments with their respiratory organs unlike xiphosurans or other basal euarthropods. Its trabeculae are also highly similar to those of arachnids, especially that of a specimen of an indeterminate species of Palaeocharinus from the Devonian.

The presence of trabeculae also confirms that the kiemenplatten, ventral vascular structures of the eurypterids, acted indeed as active respiratory structures during air breathing as previously suggested. This and the evidence of land incursions made by stylonurines implies that eurypterids could stay out of the water for prolongated periods. This does not change the fact that they were predominantly aquatic creatures, just as their swimming paddles (which A. pyrrhae also possessed) indicate. Furthermore, it is possible that being out of the water would have been ineffective for them during their alimentation, limiting the time they stayed there. However, they may have moved from pool to pool to breed in safer locations, supported by the usual separation between adult and juvenile eurypterids in the fossil record and by the possession of spermatophores, which could have allowed eurypterids to store sperm for months to give them time to seek a secure environment.

=== Age-based segregation ===
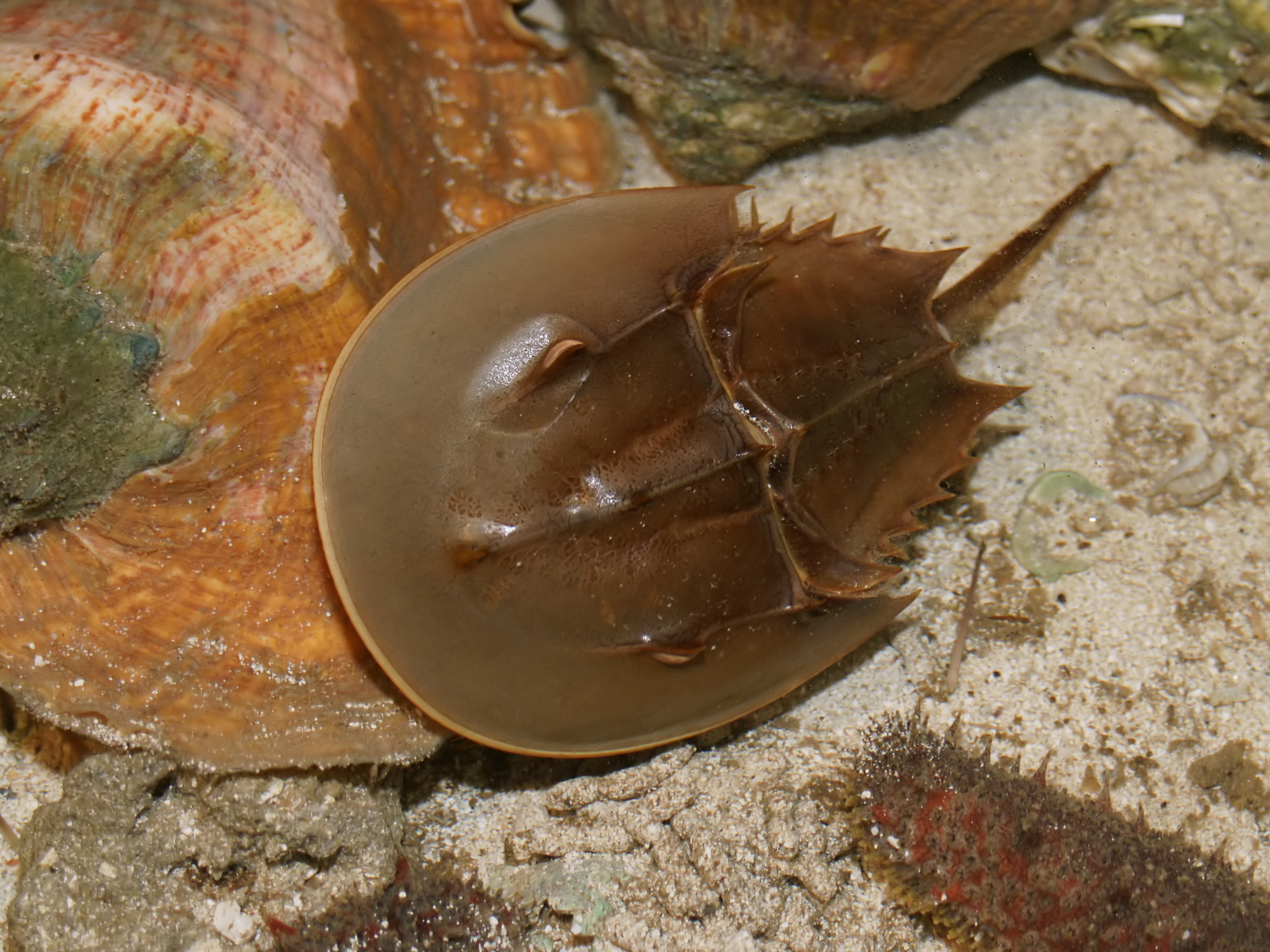
The same type of age-based segregation of individuals seen in modern horseshoe crabs (genus Limulus, pictured) has been inferred from Adelophthalmus.

In the Madera Formation, Adelophthalmus and associated organisms lived in bodies of brackish to fresh water in what is assumed to have been a deltaic plain. The lack of large coal beds suggests that the fossil localities which have yielded Adelophthalmus was a moderately elevated region with less dense vegetation and better drainage than the swamplands that occupied much of the rest of the United States. The discovery of a large assemblage of A. luceroensis, including several adults and juveniles, allowed researchers to determine different habitat preferences for different age groups. Larger individuals (adults) are found associated with large plant fragments, including branches of Walchia and leaves of Cordaites, but smaller individuals (juveniles) are found in fossil beds containing less organic material and mostly smaller plant fragments. The large plant fragments of the adult habitat were deposited in quiet conditions, likely through leaves dropping into enclosed lagoons or standing ponds.

The juveniles appear to have developed and lived in somewhat different conditions than the adults. In beds where juveniles are more common, insect fossils are more common as well, indicating a lack of adults that were capable of devouring them, and the presence of smaller plant fossils suggest a less prolific vegetation cover, the juvenile environment possibly having been lower areas on the delta plain between the ponds. Periodically, storms would drive marine water into the ponds, where salinity would thus be variable, while juveniles could live in fresher and less variable environments further away from the shoreline. It is possible that the adults mated in the streams that fed the ponds, and then returned to live in the ponds because of a richer food supply being present.

Age-based segregation of this kind between juveniles and adults of the same population is relatively normal in arthropods, for instance, juveniles of the related and modern Limulus live in different environments and regions than the adults. The advantage of this form of segregation is not only to allow younger individuals to live in conditions more stable from a salinity standpoint, but also to keep juveniles safe from situations in which substantial amounts of marine water decimated the populations in the ponds by altering the living conditions too much. In such a situation, younger populations could after some time recolonize the old habitats.

== See also ==
- List of eurypterid genera
- Timeline of eurypterid research
- Campylocephalus—the last known surviving walking (stylonurine) eurypterid.
- Pterygotus—another eurypterid with an almost worldwide distribution.
