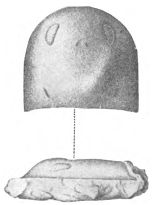
- Carapace of N. prominens

Scientific classification
- Kingdom: Animalia
- Phylum: Arthropoda
- Subphylum: Chelicerata
- Order: †Eurypterida
- Superfamily: †Adelophthalmoidea
- Family: †Nanahughmilleriidae; Lamsdell, 2025
- Genus: †Nanahughmilleria; Kjellesvig-Waering, 1961

Type species
- †Nanahughmilleria norvegica Kiær, 1911

Species
- †N. clarkei Kjellesvig-Waering, 1964; †N. norvegica Kiær, 1911; †N. notosibirica Shpiney, 2012; †N. prominens Hall, 1884

= Nanahughmilleria =

Nanahughmilleria Temporal range: Llandovery–Lochkovian

Extinct genus of arthropods

Nanahughmilleria ("dwarf Hughmilleria") is a genus of eurypterid, an extinct group of aquatic arthropods. Fossils of Nanahughmilleria have been discovered in deposits of Devonian and Silurian age in the United States, Norway, Russia, and Scotland, and have been referred to several different species.

Nanahughmilleria is the only genus in the family Nanahughmilleriidae, under the superfamily Adelophthalmoidea. The superfamily was characterised by their small size, their parabolic (approximately U-shaped) carapaces and the presence of epimera (lateral "extensions" of the segment) on the seventh segment, among others. Nanahughmilleria was different from its relatives by the presence of more spines in its appendages (limbs) and by its genital morphology. The largest species confidently assigned to the genus was N. norvegica at 10 cm (3.9 in), making it a comparatively small eurypterid.

== Description ==
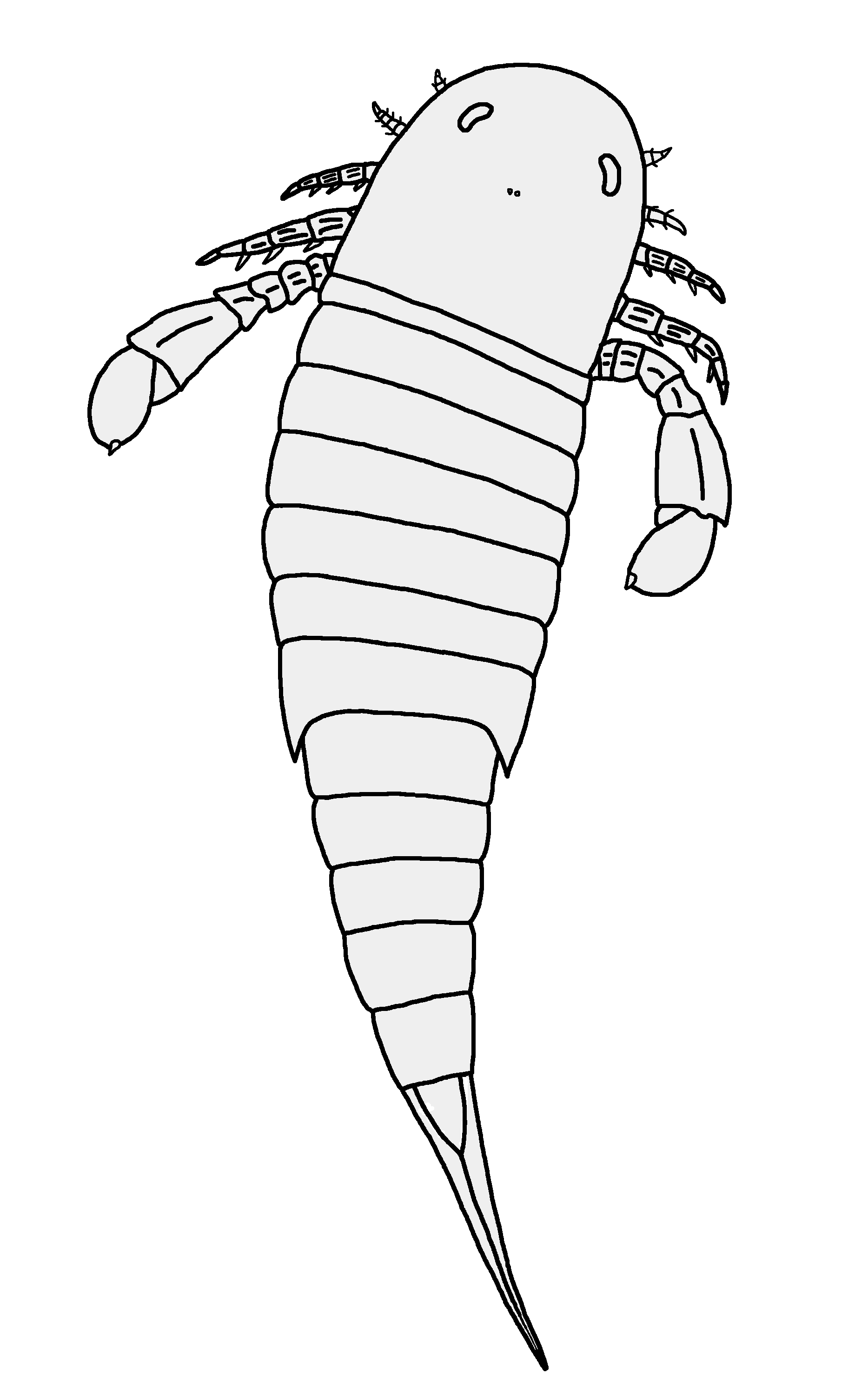
Restoration of N. norvegica.

Like other adelophthalmoid eurypterids, Nanahughmilleria was a comparatively small eurypterid. The largest species confidently assigned to the genus, N. norvegica, only reached 10 cm (3.9 in), while the smallest one, N. clarkei, did not exceed 4 cm (1.6 in). Although N. lanceolata reached 16 cm (6.3 in), this species is probably not an adelophthalmid, but an eurypteroid. Other species such as N. notosibirica reached 9 cm (3.5 in) in length, while N. pygmaea had a total length of 8 cm (3.1 in).

Nanahughmilleria had long and narrow reniform (bean-shaped) eyes placed in an intramarginal (occurring within the margin) position. The streamlined form of its body indicates that Nanahughmilleria was an active swimmer adapted to swim crosscurrent. It had epimera (lateral "extensions" of the segment) present in the seventh segment, separating the preabdomen (body segments 1 to 7) from the postabodmen (segments 8 to 12). The genital spatulae, a long, flat piece in the genital aperture, was very short. The walking legs (first to fifth appendages) of Nanahughmilleria were probably of Hughmilleria-type, that is, with a pair of spines in each podomere (leg segment). The paddle of the swimming leg was relatively wide. As in the other adelophthalmoids, the telson was lanceolate and not very expanded.

Nanahughmilleria is only distinguished from the more derived members of Adelophthalmoidea in the shorter and smaller spatulae and in the increased spinosity in the appendages.

== History of research ==
=== First discoveries ===
Size comparison of some Nanahughmilleria species. N. pygmaea has since been reclassified in Parahughmilleria.

The first species to later be classified as Nanahughmilleria was described in 1859 by John William Salter as "Eurypterus pygmaeus". Although Richard Banks first mentioned this species in 1856, this act is currently considered as nomen nudum ("naked name", a name coined without an adequate or completely missing description of it). The fossils mentioned by Banks consisted of two specimens, the first of which included carapace with the first five tergites (dorsal parts of the body segments) and the 8th and 9th segments of the swimming leg and the second including another nearly complete carapace. Both were collected in Kington, Herefordshire. N. pygmaea had an elongated carapace rounded along the anterior margin which narrows gradually anteriorly. A thin rim surrounded the carapace. The eyes were narrow, reniform and intramarginal. Its ocelli (light-sensitive simple eyes) were very small and located centrally. As in most eurypterid groups, the chelae (pincers) were small. It differs from other species in the more convergent form of the carapace and in the large size of the eyes, which were furthest from the margin. This species reached a length of 8 cm (3.1 in) in total. Erik N. Kjellesvig-Waering classified this species as part of the subgenus Hughmilleria (Nanahughmilleria) in 1961 along many other species. In 2025, James Lamsdell recovered N. pygmaea as within the genus Parahughmilleria in a phylogenetic analysis, and synonymized the species with P. salteri. As the oldest named species, this made P. salteri into P. pygmaea.

In 1884, James Hall described another species of Eurypterus, E. prominens, based on a single carapace from the Clinton Group, a geological formation of the United States. This species differs from the others by the anterior position of its eyes placed in a submarginal (almost in the margin) point, unlike other species of Nanahughmilleria and Parahughmilleria. In addition, the carapace of this species was long and with ocelli placed forward. It has been suggested that this species could represent a separate genus. In fact, notes left by Kjellesvig-Waering in museum drawers indicate that he wanted to erect a new genus for N. prominens, Clintonipterus. As in N. pygmaea, this species was assigned to Nanahughmilleria in 1961.

In 1911, the Norwegian paleontologist and geologist Johan Aschehoug Kiær described a new species of Eurypterus, E. norvegica. The carapace of this species was parabolic (approximately U-shaped) with small intramarginal arcuate eyes. The metastoma (a large plate that is part of the abdomen) was oval. Its operculum (a plate-like segment which contains the genital aperture) had a long, narrow spatulae (compared to most eurypterids). The telson was lanceolate, with a keel on both dorsal and ventral sides. It had a pair of spines in each podomere of the fifth appendage. The paddle of the swimming leg was relatively wide. It was designated the type species of Nanahughmilleria by Kjellesvig-Waering in his description of the subgenus. N. norvegica was the largest species of Nanahughmilleria, measuring 10 cm (3.9 in, with the exception of N. lanceolata, which may represent a separate genus).

In 1957, L. P. Pirozhnikov described two new species of eurypterids, N. schiraensis and Parahughmilleria matarakensis, and erroneously assigned them to the stylonurine genus Rhenopterus. This species is only known by a poorly preserved carapace which was semi-oval and elongated, with a narrow margin surrounding it. The posterior margin was slightly concave. There is only one preserved eye, which was reniform, large and rose slightly from the surface of the carapace. At the closest point between both eyes, the ocelli were placed. The fossils were found at the Matarak Formation in Minusinsk, Siberia. Kjellesvig-Waering and Willard P. Leutze noticed that the species did not really represent a Rhenopterus and they assigned it in 1966 to its current genus. It was suggested by O. Erik Tetlie and Markus Poschmann in 2008 that this species is a synonym of P. matarakensis, but the Russian paleontologist Evgeniy S. Shpinev disagreed since the prosoma of N. schiraensis was longer and its eyes were closer to the margin than in P. matarakensis. In 2025, James Lamsdell synonymized N. schiraensis with P. matarakensis.

=== Creation of the subgenus and further discoveries ===
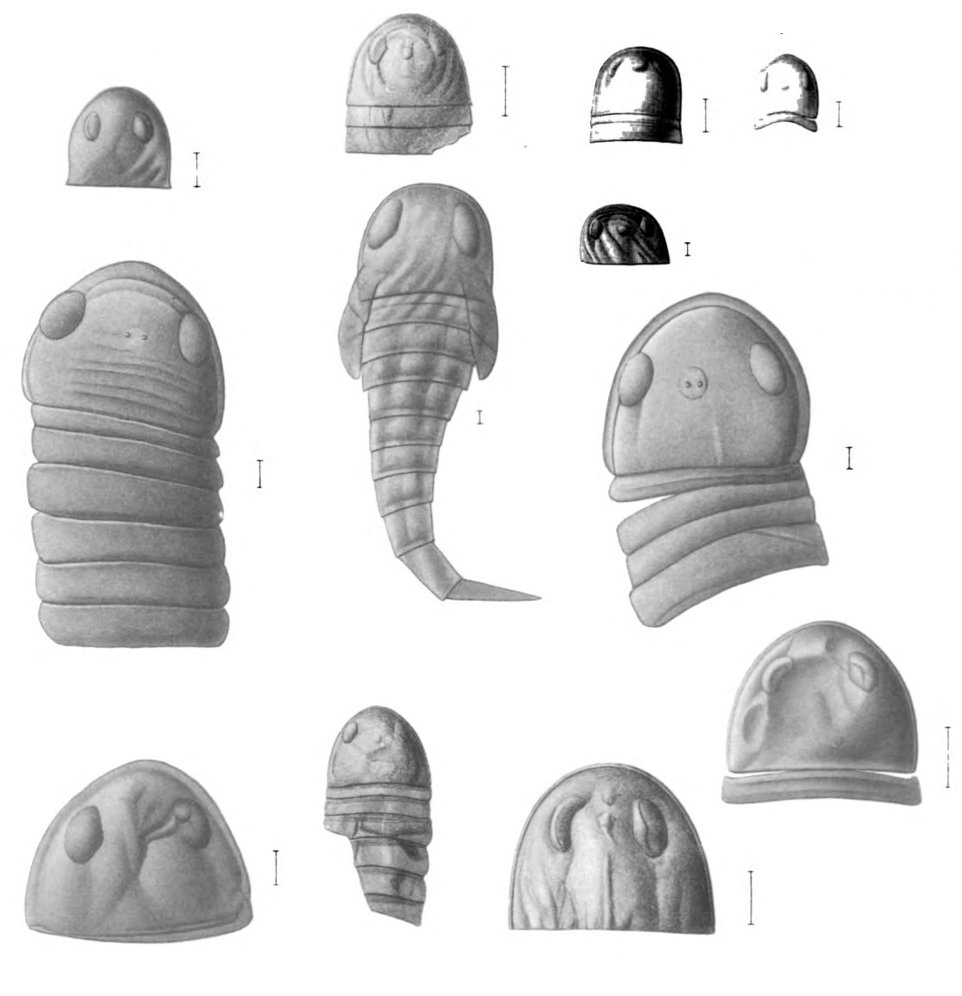
Fossils of N. clarkei previously assigned to Hughmilleria shawangunk.

In 1961, Kjellesvig-Waering separated Hughmilleria into two subgenera according to the morphology of the eyes, H. (Hughmilleria) for species with large ovoid marginal eyes and H. (Nanahughmilleria) for species with small reniform intramarginal eyes. For the latter one, H. (N.) norvegica was designated as subgenotype. He assigned a total of seven species to the subgenus, of which only four (two of them tentatively) are still in Nanahughmilleria. The generic name is composed by the Latin word nana ("dwarf") and Hughmilleria.

N. clarkei is based on a series of fossils described and assigned to Hughmilleria shawangunk by John Mason Clarke and Rudolf Ruedemann in 1912. They believed that the carapaces with intramarginal eyes were modified by the compression. While this could happen in a single specimen, it is impossible to be in so many. Kjellesvig-Waering realized this and erected the species N. clarkei in 1964, named after Clarke, who described the original Shawangunk eurypterid fauna. This small species of only 4 cm (1.6 in) had a lanceolate carapace with intramarginal eyes located anteriorly. The telson was broad and lanceolate. This species is characterized by the presence of spurs in the genal angles (a "flat" part of the carapace edge).

It would not be until 2012 when another new species, N. notosibirica, was described by Shpinev. This species is known from two specimens, the holotype (PIN 1139/1) and paratype (PIN 1139/2). Its specific name, notosibirica, comes from the Greek word notos (southern) and Siberia, referring to the place where it was discovered. The carapace was parabolic and surrounded by a narrow marginal rim and with elongated eyes probably reniform. Only the fourth and fifth pair of prosomal appendages is known. These were of Hughmilleria-type and with rather small spines. The telson was small and wedge-shaped, known from fragmentary remains. The metasoma (the posterior "part" of the body) was notably narrower than the mesosoma (the "median part"). The total size of the species could be of 9 cm (3.5 in), being one of the largest species of Nanahughmilleria. This species differs from the others in the proportions of the body and position of the eyes.

In addition, the species N. lanceolata was once tentatively classified as part of Nanahughmilleria. This species was originally described by Salter in 1856 as another species of his new genus Himantopterus (a preoccupied name, now Erettopterus). The swimming legs of this species were long and narrow, reaching the sixth segment of the body. The telson was lanceolate and with a keel in the middle. All known specimens of N. lanceolata lack eyes, making it difficult to determine their phylogenetic position. In 2008, O. Erik Tetlie and Markus Poschmann considered the prosomal and genital appendages of N. lanceolata to not be typical of the Adelophthalmoidea, but probably of the Eurypteroidea. In 2025, James Lamsdell reclassified N. lanceolata in a new genus, Selkiepterella, classified in the family Adelophthalmidae.

== Classification ==
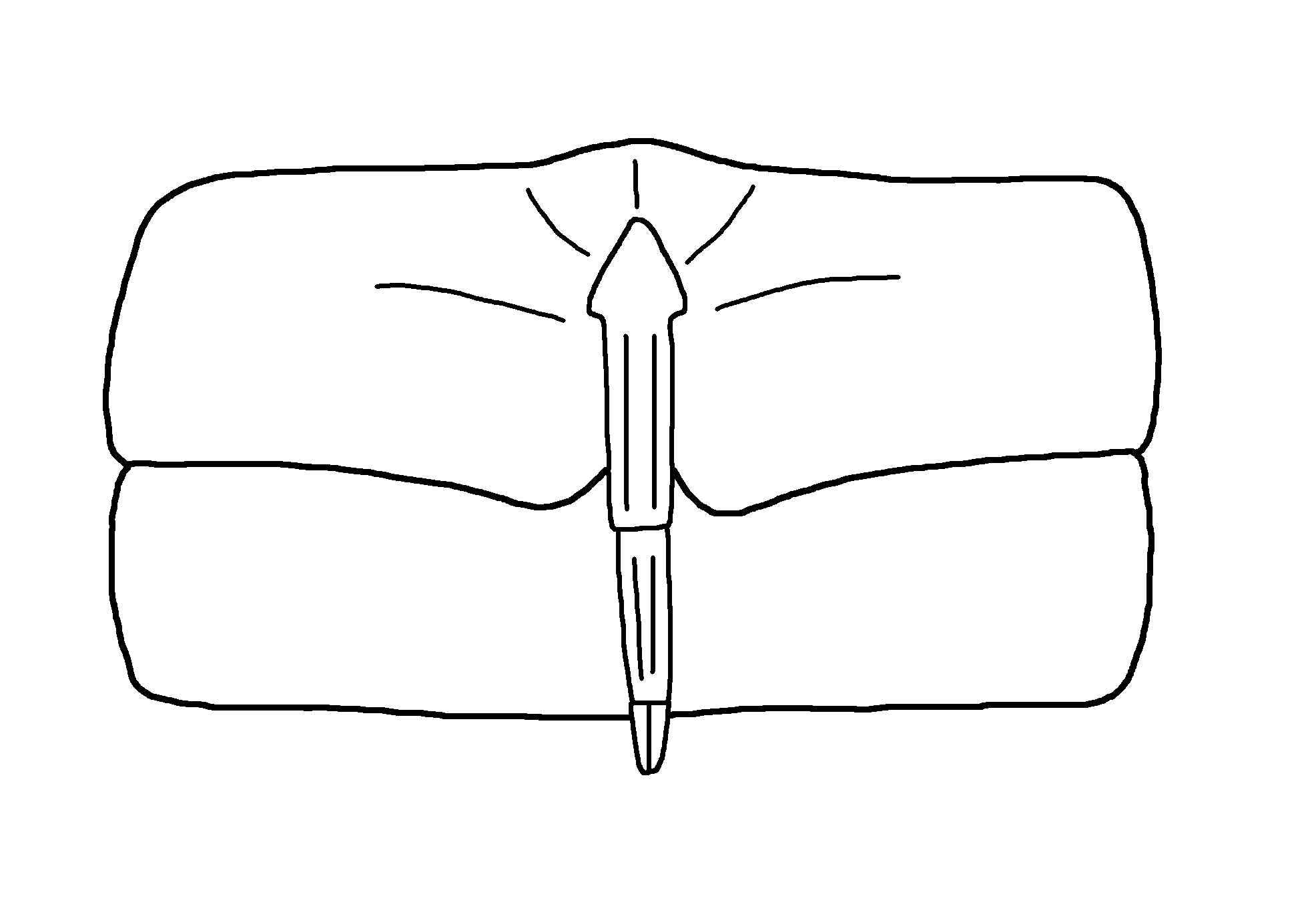
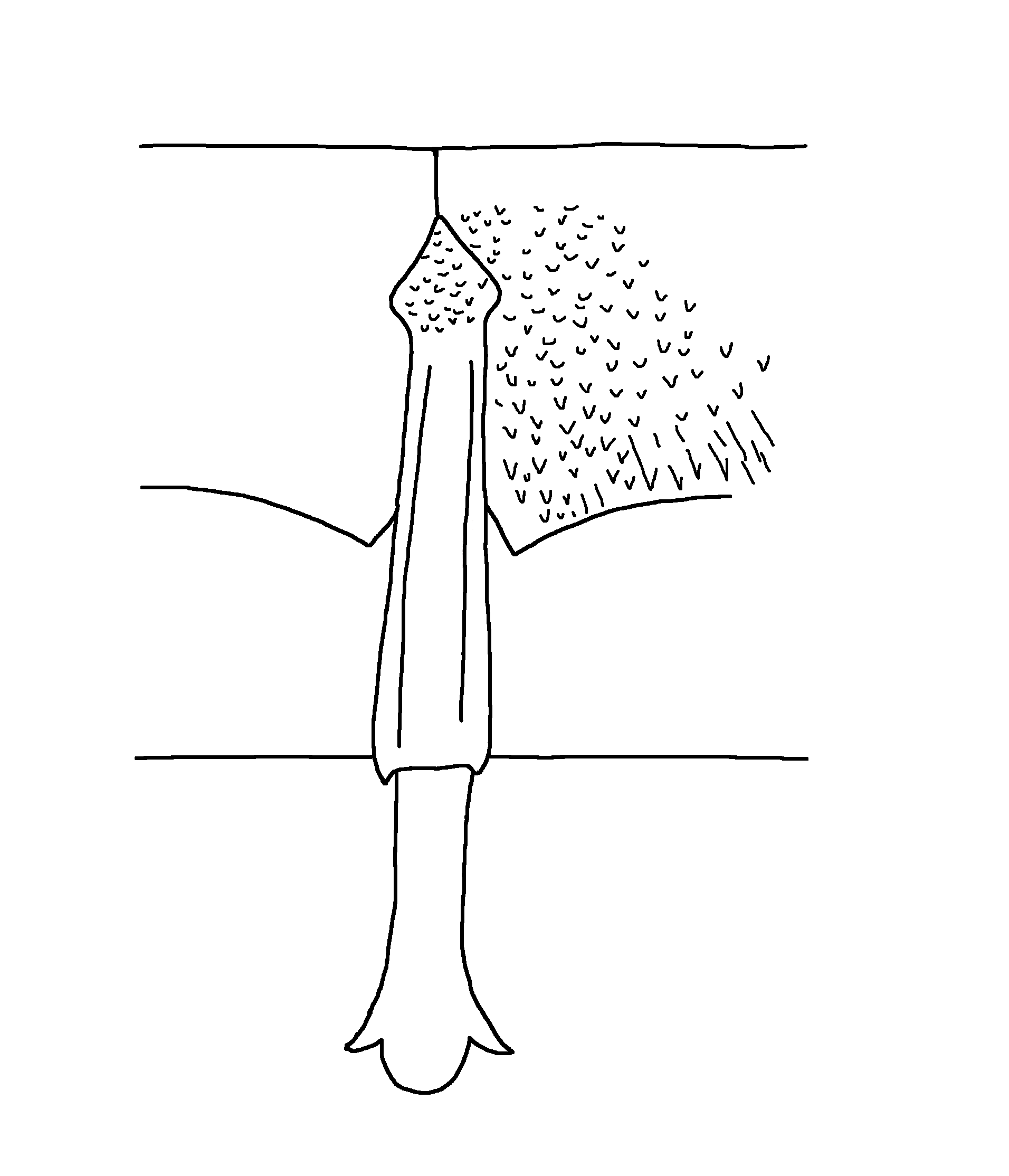
Type A genital appendages of Nanahughmilleria norvegica (top) and the closely related Pittsfordipterus phelpsae (bottom).

Nanahughmilleria is classified as part of the family Nanahughmilleriidae, within the superfamily Adelophthalmoidea. Nanahughmilleria was originally considered a subgenus of Hughmilleria, but Kjellesvig-Waering and Leutze considered it sufficiently different from Hughmilleria and elevated the subgenus to the genus level.

In 2004, O. Erik Tetlie erected the family Nanahughmilleriidae in a thesis to contain the adelophthalmoids with no or reduced genital spatulae and the second to fifth pair of prosomal appendages of Hughmilleria-type. This family contained Nanahughmileria, Pittsfordipterus and perhaps Parahughmilleria. However, the clade was almost never used in subsequent studies and lists of eurypterids, and instead, they classify the nanahughmillerids as part of Adelophthalmidae. Before 2004, Nanahughmilleria was classified in the Hughmilleriidae family. In 2025, James Lamsdell revived the use of Nanahughmilleriidae, which for the first time received a formal description and diagnosis, and classified Nanahughmilleria as the sole genus in the family.

The cladogram below follows the phylogenetic analysis of Lamsdell (2025).

- Adelophthalmoidea
  - Nanahughmilleriidae
    - Nanahughmilleria notosiberica
    - - Nanahughmilleria clarkei
      - Nanahughmilleria norvegica
  - - Parahughmilleriidae
      - Pruemopterus salgadoi
      - - Parahughmilleria pygmaea
        - - Parahughmilleria hefteri
          - Parahughmilleria fuea
    - - Pittsfordipteridae
        - Archopterus anjiensis
        - - Bassipterus bellistriata
          - - Pittsfordipterus maria
            - Pittsfordipterus phelpsae
      - Adelophthalmidae
        - Wiedopterus noctua
        - Adelophthalmus
          - - Adelophthalmus sievertsi
            - Adelophthalmus waterstoni
          - - Adelophthalmus luceroensis
            - - Adelophthalmus irinae
              - Adelophthalmus kamyshtensis
            - - Adelophthalmus zadrai
              - - Adelophthalmus imhofi
                - Adelophthalmus wilsoni
              - - Adelophthalmus granosus
                - - Adelophthalmus dumonti
                  - Adelophthalmus moyseyi
              - - Adelophthalmus approximatus
                - - - Adelophthalmus mansfieldi
                    - Adelophthalmus mazonensis
                  - - Adelophthalmus douvillei
                    - Adelophthalmus sellardsi

== Paleoecology ==
Fossils of Nanahughmilleria have been found from the Silurian deposits of the Llandovery epoch to the Devonian deposits of the Eifelian epoch in North America, Europe and Siberia. It is believed that Nanahughmilleria, along with Parahughmilleria, Hughmilleria and the pterygotids, lived mainly in shallow lakes. In addition, the streamlined shape of the body of Nanahughmilleria suggests that it was an active swimmer capable of swimming against currents.

Nanahughmilleria can occur in an environment where eurypterids were abundant or scarce. The Silurian deposits of Ringerike, Norway, where fossils of N. norvegica have been discovered, include fossil remains of Mixopterus kiaeri, Stylonuroides dolichopteroides, Kiaeropterus ruedemanni and Erettopterus holmi, among other organisms like the malacostracan Dictyocaris slimoni or the chasmataspidid Kiaeria limuloides. In the Silurian deposits of the Shawangunk Formation, Pennsylvania, N. clarkei occur together with Parahughmilleria maria, Ruedemannipterus stylonuroides, Hardieopterus myops and Hughmilleria shawangunk. Species of the gnathostomes Vernonaspis and Arthrophycus have also been found. Nanahughmilleria fossils have also been found in Scotland.

== See also ==
- List of eurypterid genera
- Timeline of eurypterid research
