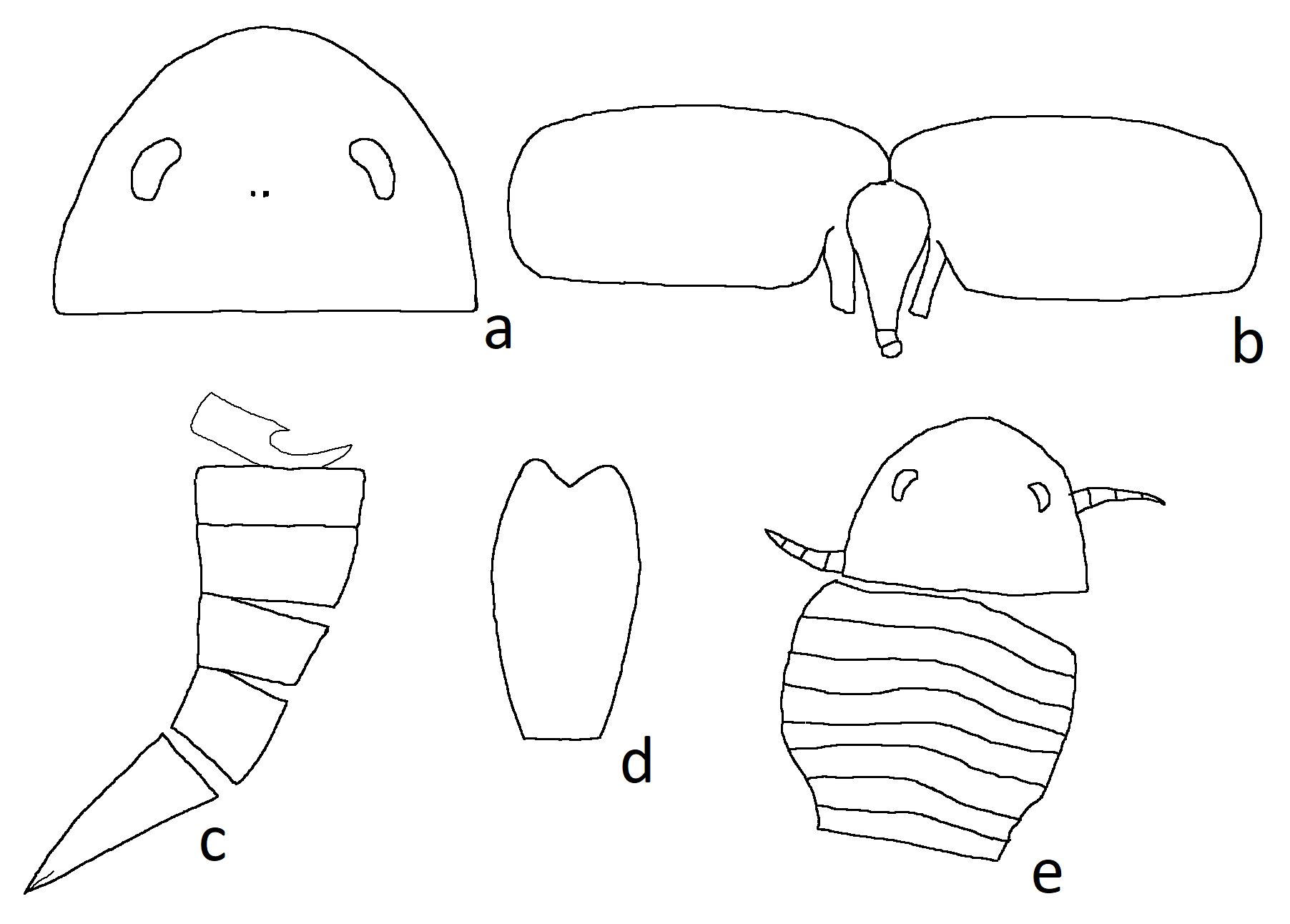
- Fossils of P. pygmaea. (a) a carapace, (b) the holotype, nearly complete operculum, (c) metasomal tergites and telson, (d) metastoma and (e) a specimen with complete mesosoma and part of the walking legs.

Scientific classification
- Kingdom: Animalia
- Phylum: Arthropoda
- Subphylum: Chelicerata
- Order: †Eurypterida
- Superfamily: †Adelophthalmoidea
- Family: †Parahughmilleriidae
- Genus: †Parahughmilleria; Kjellesvig-Waering, 1961

Type species
- †Parahughmilleria salteri (synonym of P. pygmaea); Kjellesvig-Waering, 1961

Species
- †P. fuea Ma et al., 2023; †P. hefteri Størmer, 1973; †P. longa Shpiney, 2012; †P. matarakensis Pirozhnikov, 1957; †P. salteri Kjellesvig-Waering, 1961; †P. statzi Størmer, 1936

= Parahughmilleria =

Parahughmilleria Temporal range: Llandovery-Eifelian 435–387.7 Ma

Extinct genus of arthropods

Parahughmilleria (meaning "near Hughmilleria") is a genus of eurypterid, an extinct group of aquatic arthropods. Fossils of Parahughmilleria have been discovered in deposits of the Devonian and Silurian age in the United States, Canada, Russia, Germany, Luxembourg, China and Great Britain, and have been referred to several different species. The first fossils of Parahughmilleria, discovered in the Shawangunk Mountains in 1907, were initially assigned to Eurypterus. It would not be until 54 years later when Parahughmilleria would be described.

Parahughmilleria is classified in the family Parahughmilleriidae, in the superfamily Adelophthalmoidea. The adelophthalmoids were characterised by their small size, their parabolic (approximately U-shaped) carapaces and the presence of epimera (lateral "extensions" of the segment) on the seventh segment, among others. Like its relatives, Parahughmilleria possessed reniform (bean-shaped) eyes and spines on its appendages. The largest species was P. hefteri at 12.5 cm (5 in), making it a small-sized eurypterid.

== Description ==
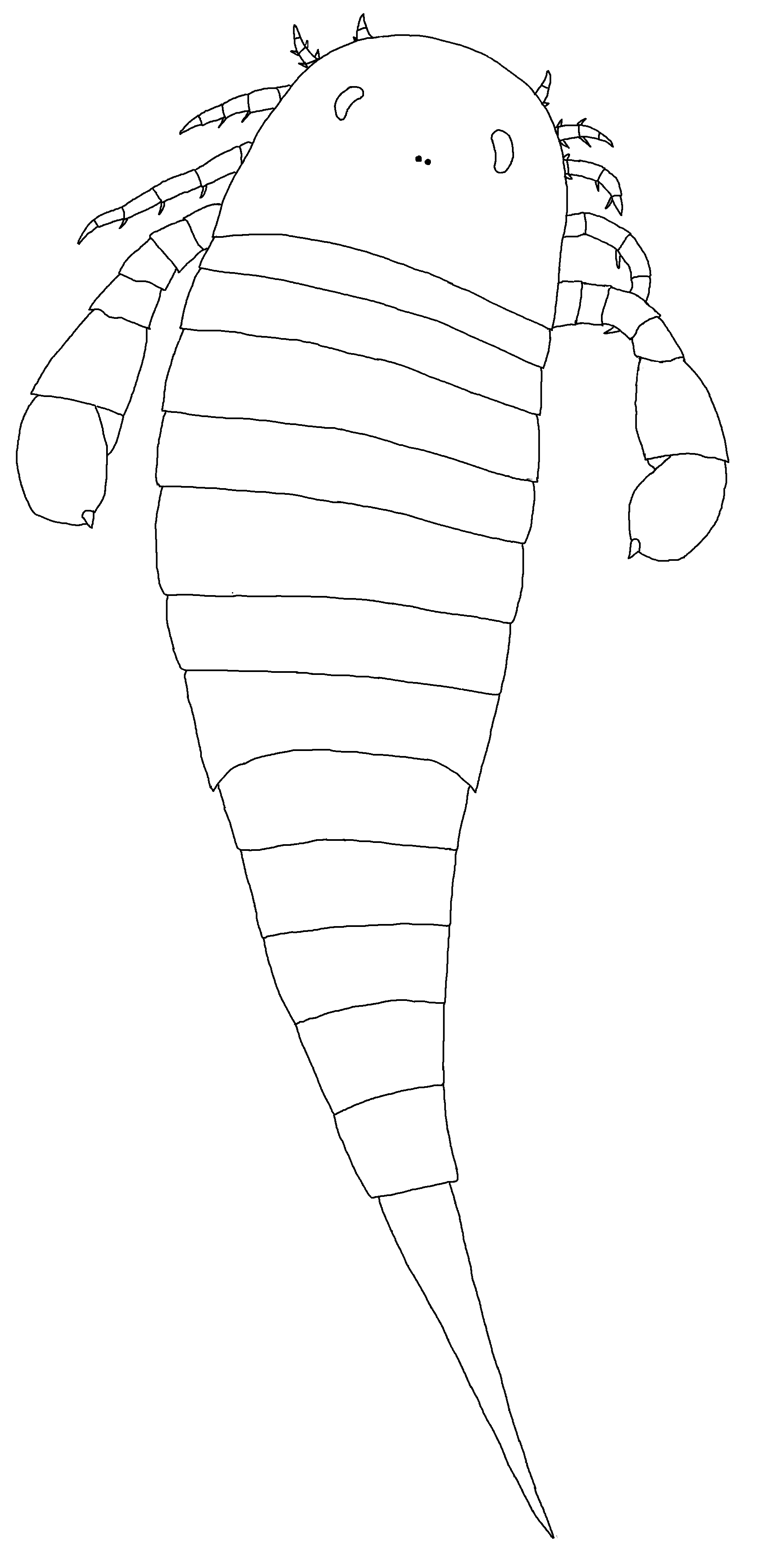
Restoration of P. hefteri.

Like other adelophthalmid eurypterids, Parahughmilleria was a small-sized eurypterid. The largest species, P. hefteri, only reached 12.5 cm (5 in). Parahughmilleria had a semicircular carapace (head plate) with reniform compound eyes placed forward, which is its main characteristic. The metastoma (a large plate that is part of the abdomen) had a deep anterior triangular notch. The telson (the posteriormost division of the body) was wide and lanceolate. The preabdomen (body segments 1 to 7) had a lanceolate shape with a big epimera (lateral "extensions" of the segment) on the 7th tergite (dorsal portion of an arthropod segment). The 3rd tergite was the most wide segment on the body.

Parahughmilleria differs from other more basal members of Adelophthalmoidea in its reduced spinosity (being spinous) on the appendages, that along with other factors like the large spatulae (a long, flat piece in the operculum) associated with the genital operculum (plate-like segment which contains the genital aperture), suggests a closer relationship with Adelophthalmus.

== History of research ==
=== First discoveries ===
Size comparison of several species of Parahughmilleria. The chart reflects pre-2025 taxonomy; P. major and P. hefteri are now considered synonyms, P. salteri is a junior synonym of P. pygmaea, and P. bellistriata and P. maria have been reclassified to other genera.

The first fossil remains to later be attributed to Parahughmilleria were found in the Shawangunk Mountains, New York. John Mason Clarke described and assigned them in 1907 to Eurypterus maria. The carapace of this species was somewhat elongate, regularly rounded and with subparallel (almost parallel) lateral margins with subcentral (near the centre of the carapace) eyes of a crescentic (half moon shaped) form. The segments were wide. A rapid contraction was observed in the postabdomen (segments 8 to 12) reminiscent of the scorpion abdomen, which seems to indicate a nepionic (immature) condition. Similar contraction is present in other immature eurypterids as well. The only known adult eurypterids to possess it are Carcinosoma scorpioides and several species of Eusarcana, in which the tail was heavily specialized. The ocelli (light-sensitive simple eyes) were located in a line that connected the centers of the compound eyes, and were located on a large prominent mound. The abdomen was thin and tapered towards the telson, which was lanceolate. The third and fourth segments were the widest of the preabdomen. Each tergite of the preadomen was arched with a narrow flat strip (the epimera). In this species, the appendages are rare, and only swimming legs have been found in some mature specimens. These were short and protuberant. The eighth segment or paddle was long and elliptical, with a ninth segment forming a terminal claw. In 1961, Erik N. Kjellesvig-Waering reclassified E. maria to the then new genus Parahughmilleria.

In 1950, Kjellesvig-Waering described a new species of Hughmilleria, H. bellistriata. The holotype is the dorsal side of a carapace. In this carapace, the eyes, ocelli and most of its surface with ornamentation are preserved. The prosoma (head) was broad, evenly rounded at the anterior lateral angles and the anterior margin. The lateral and anterior margins were bounded by a thin, rounded and raised rim. The eyes were lateral, reniform (bean-shaped) and intramarginal (occurring within the margin). The ornamentation of the carapace consists of distinct transverse striations along the previous part in front of the eyes. Kjellesvig-Waering noted that this species was different from the other Hughmilleria species. The outline of the carapace, the intramarginal eyes and the small size (7 cm, 2.8 in) did not resemble the other species. As he did with P. maria, he reassigned the species to Parahughmilleria in 1961.

In 1957, L. P. Pirozhnikov described two new species of eurypterids, P. matarakensis and Nanahughmilleria schiraensis, and erroneously assigned them to the genus Rhenopterus. P. matarakensis is represented by well-preserved carapaces. These were semi-oval and were girded by a narrow edge. The trailing edge was slightly concave inward, towards the anterior part. The eyes were large, at 4 mm (0.16 in) long and 2 mm (0.07 in) wide. They were reniform, and rose slightly from the surface of the carapace. At the closest point between both eyes, there were two round ocelli. The fossils were found at the Matarak Formation in Minusinsk, Siberia. P. matarakensis was assigned to its current genus by Kjellesvig-Waering and Willard P. Leutze.

=== Creation of the genus and additional species ===
In 1961, Kjellesvig-Waering erected the genus Parahughmilleria (meaning "near Hughmilleria") and assigned P. salteri as the type species. He noticed that Parahughmilleria differed from Hughmilleria in the development of supplementary lobes on the operculum (as in Adelophthalmus) and in the position of the intramarginal eyes, unlike the marginal eyes of Hughmilleria. P. salteri was described based on a holotype and four paratypes. In this species, the prosoma was widely rounded, smooth, nearly semicircular and highly arched, and was surrounded by a narrow and marginal rim. The base formed a straight line. The eyes were small, reniform and placed intramarginally. The ocelli were small and placed almost centrally on the prosoma. The telson was flat, lanceolate and broad at the anterior. An operculum that shows the lobes has been described as the holotype. It comprises two opercular flaps (protruding extensions lateral to the genital appendage) rounded at the corners and separated. They were separated from each other at the midsection and above the median appendage. The specific name of this species honors John William Salter, an English naturalist and paleontologist, and its maximum size was of 8 cm (3.1 in). Kjellesvig-Waering also assigned P. phelpsae to the genus, but this species has since been raised to the genus level under the name Pittsfordipterus.

Later, in 1973, Leif Størmer described two new species, P. major and P. hefteri. Both represent the largest and the smallest species, respectively. P. hefteri is a well-known species that has been found both in Europe and in North America. It had enlarged spines on at least one podomere (leg segment) and a relatively wide swimming leg. Both species had a sharply truncated posterior margin in the metastoma, which only differ by their ratios. P. major had a longer telson with more lateral concave margins and a broader base, a more slender body and narrower paddles than P. hefteri. Størmer also noticed slight differences in the genital appendage. All these differences can be explained by ontogenetic stages, that is, different developmental stages of the animal throughout its life.

In 2012, the Russian paleontologist Evgeniy S. Shpinev described another species, P. longa, from the Khakassia, Russia. Its specific name, from the Latin longus, refers to the unusual length of its prosoma compared to the other species of the genus, about 17 mm (about 0.67 in) long and 18 mm (0.71 in) wide. The holotype and only known specimen (PIN1220/3) consists of an incomplete prosoma and fragments from a swimming leg. In this species, the prosoma was surrounded by a narrow marginal margin. The posterior margin was slightly convex. The eyes were small and, as in other species, reniform. The swimming leg was of Adelophthalmus-type, with the fifth, sixth, seventh and part of the eighth segment known. The seventh segment was very long and narrow, while the eight segment was irregular along the outer edge. This species is distinguished by having a prosoma narrower and longer than others.

In addition, Markus Poschmann transferred Erieopterus statzi to Parahughmilleria in 2015 based on the proportions of paddle segments which were more related to those of P. hefteri. This species is only known by a single specimen that was originally assigned to Eurypterus, but Kjellesvig-Waering classified it to Erieopterus based on the shape of the prosoma lacking of ornamentation and on the highly serrated paddle. Nine years before Poschmann referred E. statzi to Parahughmilleria, he and O. Erik Tetlie had already suggested this change, which was not done because of the need to study the material.

A new species, Parahughmilleria fuea, was described by Ma et al. in 2023, based on fossils found in the Early Devonian (Lochkovian) Xiaxishancun Formation of Yunnan province, southwest China.

In a 2025 eurypterid monograph, James Lamsdell reclassified Parahughmilleria maria as a species of Pittsfordipterus, and P. bellistriata as a synonym of Bassipterus. P. hefteri was furthermore formally designated as merely juveniles of P. major. Since the name P. hefteri took priority, this makes P. major a synonym of P. hefteri. Furthermore, the species Nanahughmillaria pygmaea was designated as a synonym of P. salteri, the type species of Parahughmilleria. Since N. pygmaea was named first, P. salteri was thus redesignated as P. pygmaea.

== Classification ==
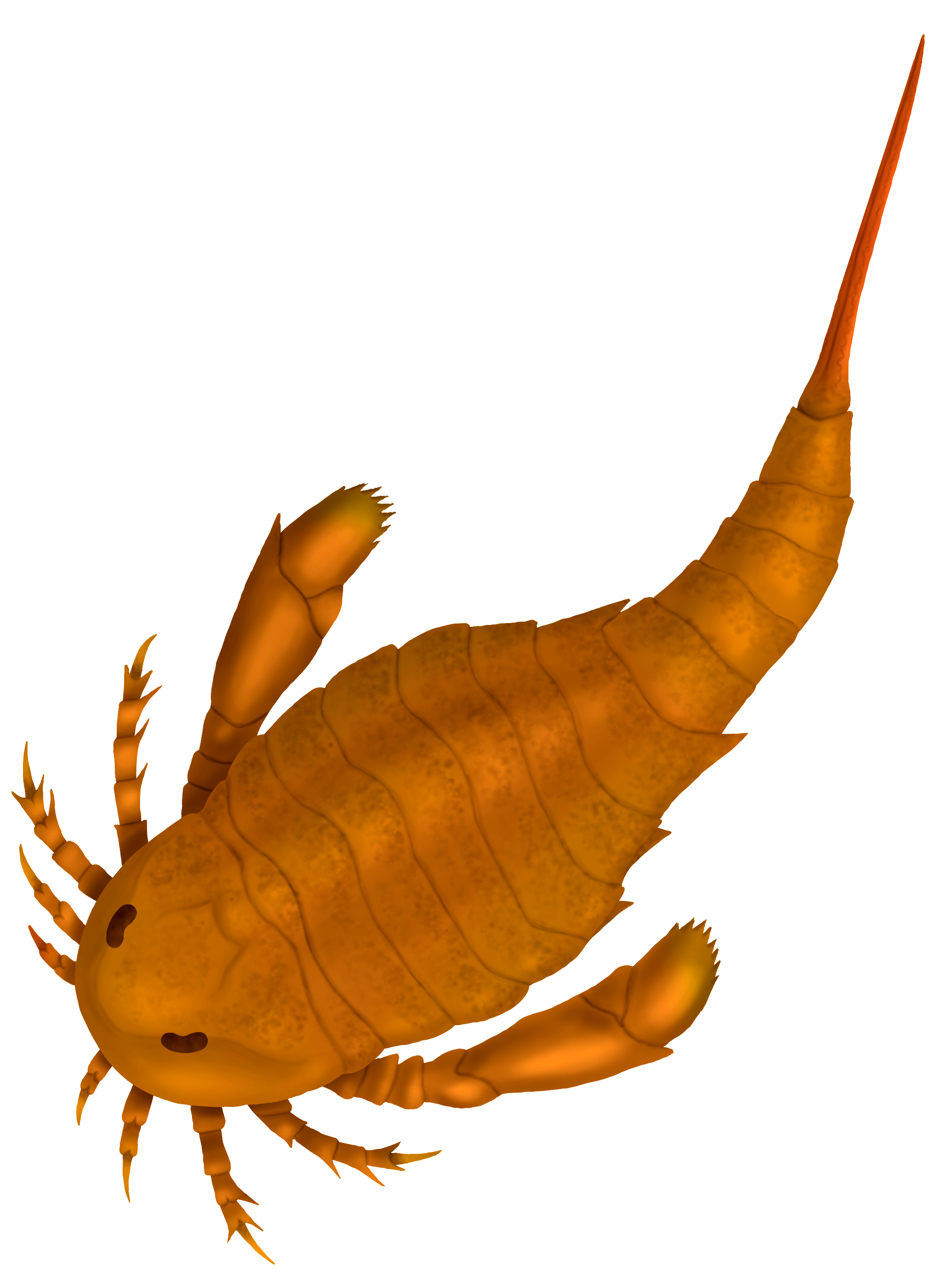
Restoration of the related Adelophthalmus.

Parahughmilleria is classified as part of the family Parahughmilleriidae, in the superfamily Adelophthalmoidea. Parahughmilleria was classified in the family Hughmilleriidae until the creation of Adelophthalmidae by Victor P. Tollerton, Jr. in 1989.

The cladogram below follows the phylogenetic analysis of Lamsdell (2025).

- Adelophthalmoidea
  - Nanahughmilleriidae
    - Nanahughmilleria notosiberica
    - - Nanahughmilleria clarkei
      - Nanahughmilleria norvegica
  - - Parahughmilleriidae
      - Pruemopterus salgadoi
      - - Parahughmilleria pygmaea
        - - Parahughmilleria hefteri
          - Parahughmilleria fuea
    - - Pittsfordipteridae
        - Archopterus anjiensis
        - - Bassipterus bellistriata
          - - Pittsfordipterus maria
            - Pittsfordipterus phelpsae
      - Adelophthalmidae
        - Wiedopterus noctua
        - Adelophthalmus
          - - Adelophthalmus sievertsi
            - Adelophthalmus waterstoni
          - - Adelophthalmus luceroensis
            - - Adelophthalmus irinae
              - Adelophthalmus kamyshtensis
            - - Adelophthalmus zadrai
              - - Adelophthalmus imhofi
                - Adelophthalmus wilsoni
              - - Adelophthalmus granosus
                - - Adelophthalmus dumonti
                  - Adelophthalmus moyseyi
              - - Adelophthalmus approximatus
                - - - Adelophthalmus mansfieldi
                    - Adelophthalmus mazonensis
                  - - Adelophthalmus douvillei
                    - Adelophthalmus sellardsi

== Paleoecology ==
Fossils of Parahughmilleria have been found from the Silurian deposits of the Llandovery epoch to the Devonian deposits of the Eifelian epoch in North America, Europe and Siberia. The fossils of Parahughmilleria are often recovered in non-marine deposits such as in environments that were once brackish or estuarine habitats with possible tidal influences and with a marine influence more evident than in the Adelophthalmus-dominated habitats. In habitats where both Parahughmilleria and early species of Adelophthalmus are found, such as in Early Devonian fossil sites in Germany, Parahughmilleria occur in sections that are considerably more marginally marine than those sections inhabited by Adelophthalmus. As Jaekelopterus and other some eurypterids, Parahughmilleria probably wandered in and out of the lagoons.

The argillaceous (composed of clay-like materials) Devonian deposits of Alken, Germany, where fossils of P. heftari and P. major have been found, contains various eurypterids such as Rhenopterus macroturberculatus, Jaekelopterus rhenaniae, Alkenopterus brevitelson and Vinetopterus struvei. Fossils from other organisms have also been found, including the myriapod Eoarthropleura devonica, the chasmataspidids Diploaspis casteri and Heteroaspis novojilovi and the arachnid Alkenia mirabilis. In the Silurian deposits of the Temeside Shale, England, where the type species has been discovered, fossils of several organisms have been found, most of them eurypterids such as Erettopterus gigas, and Salteropterus abbreviatus, but also indeterminate species of the osteostracid Hemicyclaspis and the thelodontid Logania. Parahughmilleria fossils have also been discovered in the United States, Russia, Luxembourg, Canada and Scotland.

== See also ==
- List of eurypterid genera
- Timeline of eurypterid research
