= Ordovician =

Second period of the Paleozoic Era

- 486.85 ± 1.5 – 443.1 ± 0.9 Ma
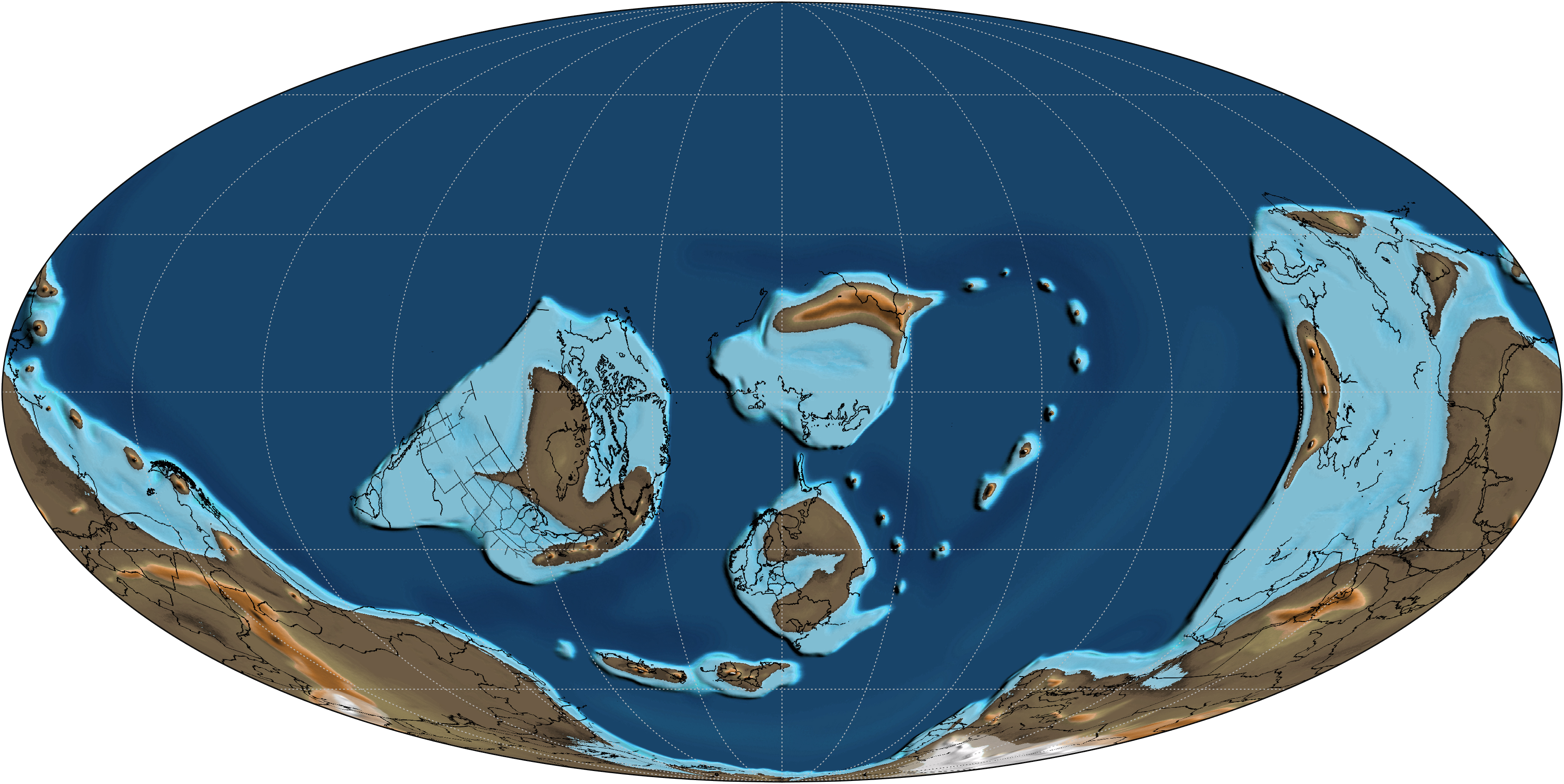
- A map of Earth as it appeared 465 million years ago during the Middle Ordovician Epoch

Chronology
← / First land plant spores; ← / Ordovician meteor event
Subdivision of the Ordovician according to the ICS, as of 2024. Vertical axis scale: Millions of years ago

Etymology
- Name formality: Formal
- Name ratified: 1960

Usage information
- Celestial body: Earth
- Regional usage: Global (ICS)
- Time scale(s) used: ICS Time Scale

Definition
- Chronological unit: Period
- Stratigraphic unit: System
- First proposed by: Charles Lapworth, 1879
- Time span formality: Formal
- Lower boundary definition: FAD of the Conodont Iapetognathus fluctivagus
- Lower boundary GSSP: Greenpoint section, Green Point, Newfoundland, Canada; 49.6829°N 57.9653°W
- Lower GSSP ratified: January 2000
- Upper boundary definition: FAD of the Graptolite Akidograptus ascensus
- Upper boundary GSSP: Dob's Linn, Moffat, U.K. 55.4400°N 3.2700°W
- Upper GSSP ratified: 1984

Atmospheric and climatic data
- Sea level above present day: 180 m; rising to 220 m in Caradoc and falling sharply to 141 m in end-Ordovician glaciations

The Ordovician (/ɔːrdəˈvɪʃi.ən, -doʊ-, -ˈvɪʃən/ or-də-VISH-ee-ən, -doh-, -VISH-ən) is a geologic period and system, the second of six periods of the Paleozoic Era, and the second of twelve periods of the Phanerozoic Eon. The Ordovician spans 43.75 million years from the end of the Cambrian Period 486.85 Ma (million years ago) to the start of the Silurian Period 443.1 Ma.

The Ordovician, named after the Welsh tribe of the Ordovices, was defined by Charles Lapworth in 1879 to resolve a dispute between followers of Adam Sedgwick and Roderick Murchison, who were placing the same rock beds in North Wales in the Cambrian and Silurian systems, respectively. Lapworth recognized that the fossil fauna in the disputed strata were different from those of either the Cambrian or the Silurian systems, and placed them in a system of their own. The Ordovician received international approval in 1960 (forty years after Lapworth's death), when it was adopted as an official period of the Paleozoic Era by the International Geological Congress.

Life continued to flourish during the Ordovician as it had in the earlier Cambrian Period, although the end of the period was marked by the Ordovician–Silurian extinction events. Invertebrates, namely molluscs and arthropods, dominated the oceans, with members of the latter group probably starting their establishment on land during this time, becoming fully established by the Devonian. The first land plants are known from this period. The Great Ordovician Biodiversification Event considerably increased the diversity of life. Fish, the world's first true vertebrates, continued to evolve, and those with jaws may have first appeared late in the period. About 100 times as many meteorites struck the Earth per year during the Ordovician compared with today in a period known as the Ordovician meteor event. It has been theorized that this increase in impacts originated from a break up of an asteroid during this time.

== Subdivisions ==
In 2008, the ICS erected a formal international system of subdivisions for the Ordovician Period and System. Pre-existing Baltoscandic, British, Siberian, North American, Australian, Chinese, Mediterranean and North-Gondwanan regional stratigraphic schemes are also used locally.

Series/epoch	Stage/age	Lower boundary
Upper/Late Ordovician	Hirnantian	445.2 ± 0.9 Ma
Upper/Late Ordovician	Katian	452.8 ± 0.7 Ma
Upper/Late Ordovician	Sandbian	458.2 ± 0.7 Ma
Middle Ordovician	Darriwilian	469.4 ± 0.9 Ma
Middle Ordovician	Dapingian	471.3 ± 1.4 Ma
Lower/Early Ordovician	Floian	477.1 ± 1.2 Ma
Lower/Early Ordovician	Tremadocian	486.85 ± 1.5 Ma

== Paleogeography and tectonics ==
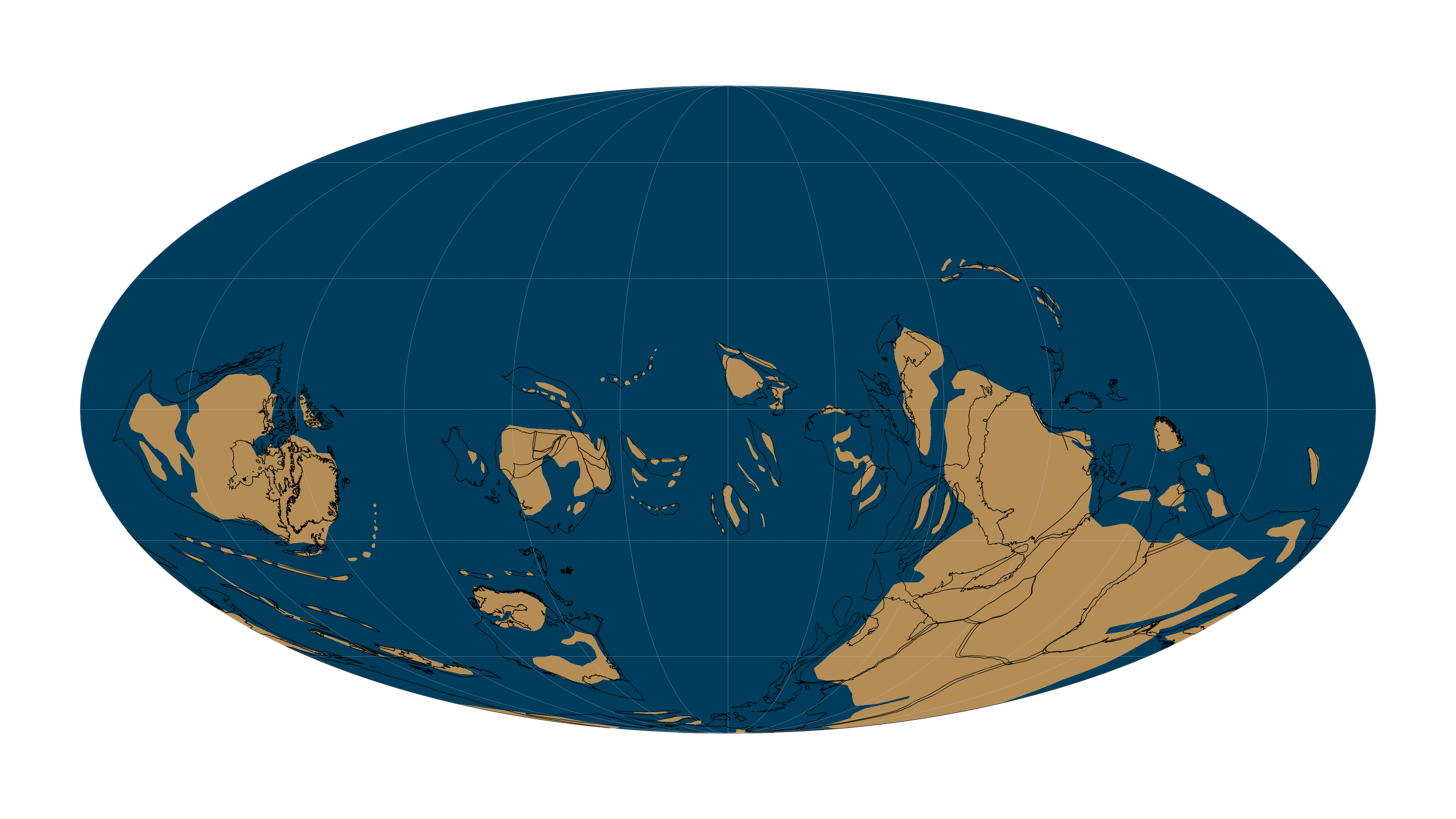
Paleogeographic map of the Earth in the early Ordovician, 480 million years ago

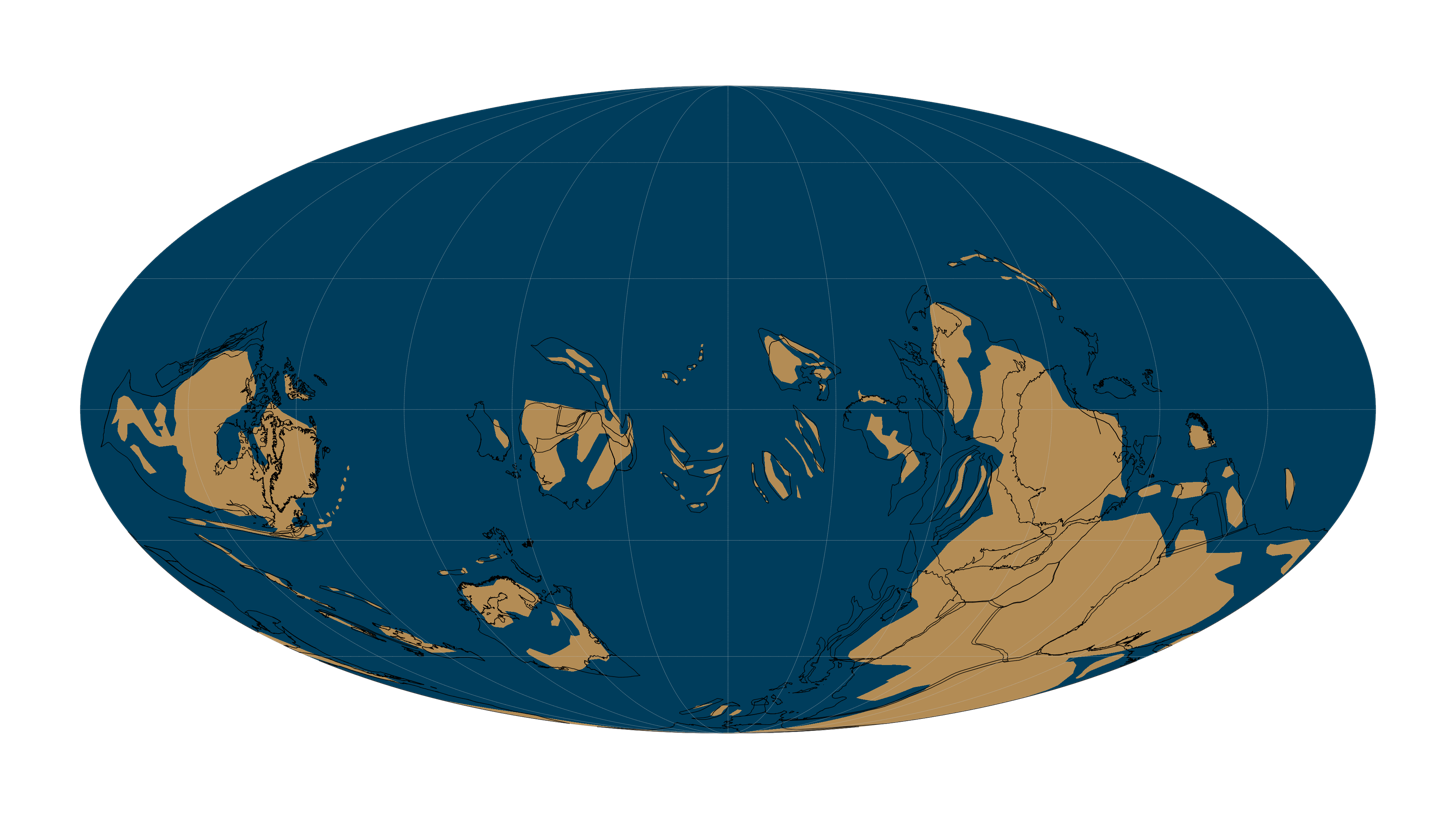
Paleogeographic map of the Earth in the middle Ordovician, 470 million years ago

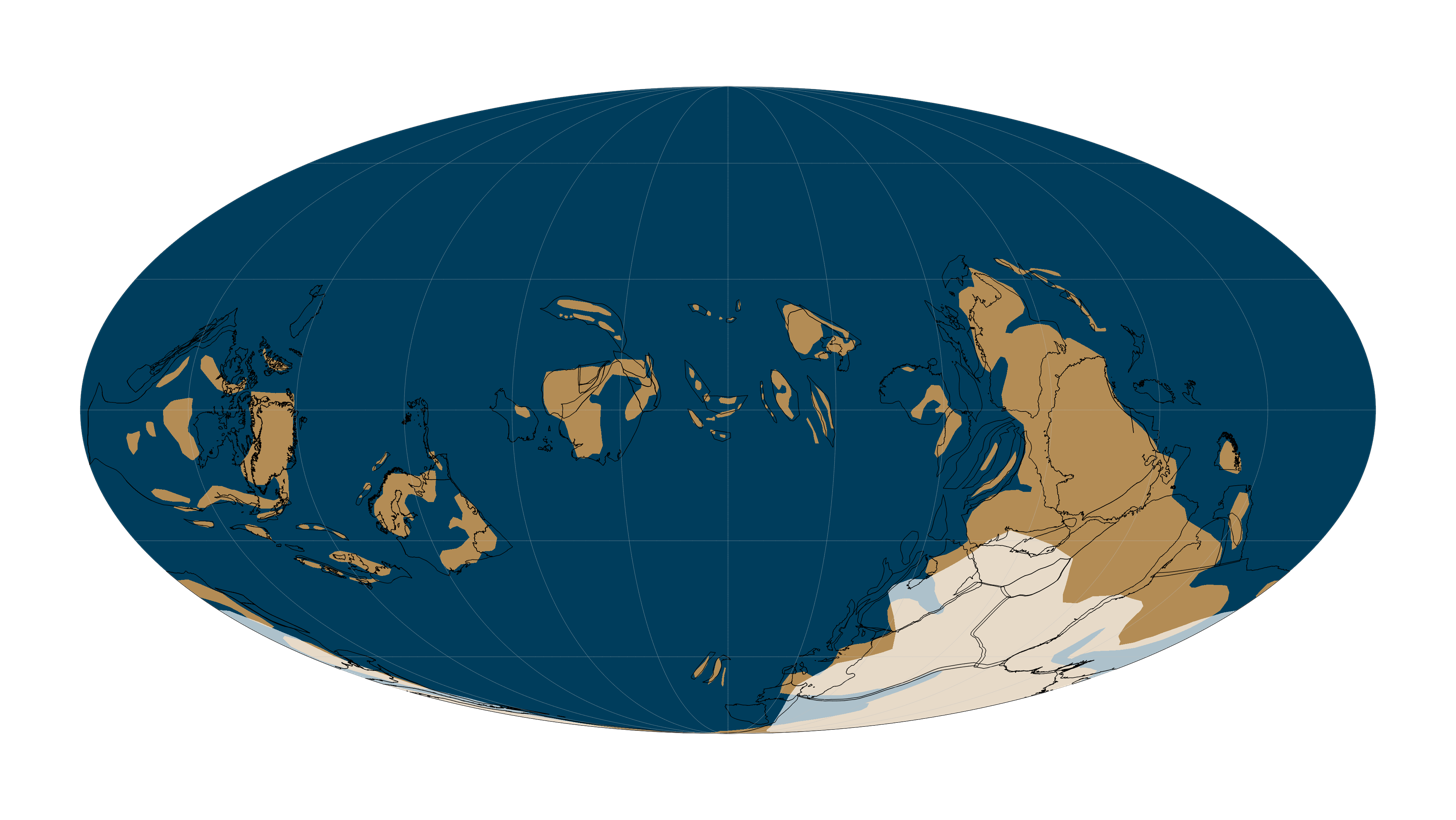
Paleogeographic map of the Earth in the late Ordovician, 450 million years ago

During the Ordovician, the southern continents were assembled into Gondwana, which reached from north of the equator to the South Pole. The Panthalassic Ocean, centered in the northern hemisphere, covered over half the globe. At the start of the period, the continents of Laurentia (in present-day North America), Siberia, and Baltica (present-day northern Europe) were separated from Gondwana by over 5,000 kilometres (3,100 mi) of ocean. These smaller continents were also sufficiently widely separated from each other to develop distinct communities of benthic organisms. The small continent of Avalonia had just rifted from Gondwana and began to move north towards Baltica and Laurentia, opening the Rheic Ocean between Gondwana and Avalonia. Avalonia collided with Baltica towards the end of Ordovician.

Other geographic features of the Ordovician world included the Tornquist Sea, which separated Avalonia from Baltica; the Aegir Ocean, which separated Baltica from Siberia; and an oceanic area between Siberia, Baltica, and Gondwana which expanded to become the Paleoasian Ocean in Carboniferous time. The Mongol-Okhotsk Ocean formed a deep embayment between Siberia and the Central Mongolian terranes. Most of the terranes of central Asia were part of an equatorial archipelago whose geometry is poorly constrained by the available evidence.

The period was one of extensive, widespread tectonism and volcanism. However, orogenesis (mountain-building) was not primarily due to continent-continent collisions. Instead, mountains arose along active continental margins during accretion of arc terranes or ribbon microcontinents. Accretion of new crust was limited to the Iapetus margin of Laurentia; elsewhere, the pattern was of rifting in back-arc basins followed by remerger. This reflected episodic switching from extension to compression. The initiation of new subduction reflected a global reorganization of tectonic plates centered on the amalgamation of Gondwana.

The Taconic orogeny, a major mountain-building episode, was well under way in Cambrian times. This continued into the Ordovician, when at least two volcanic island arcs collided with Laurentia to form the Appalachian Mountains. Laurentia was otherwise tectonically stable. An island arc accreted to South China during the period, while subduction along north China (Sulinheer) resulted in the emplacement of ophiolites.

The ash fall of the Millburg/Big Bentonite bed, at about 454 Ma, was the largest in the last 590 million years. This had a dense rock equivalent volume of as much as 1,140 cubic kilometres (270 cu mi). Remarkably, this appears to have had little impact on life.

There was vigorous tectonic activity along northwest margin of Gondwana during the Floian, 478 Ma, recorded in the Central Iberian Zone of Spain. The activity reached as far as Turkey by the end of Ordovician. The opposite margin of Gondwana, in Australia, faced a set of island arcs. The accretion of these arcs to the eastern margin of Gondwana was responsible for the Benambran Orogeny of eastern Australia. Subduction also took place along what is now Argentina (Famatinian Orogeny) at 450 Ma. This involved significant back arc rifting. The interior of Gondwana was tectonically quiet until the Triassic.

Towards the end of the Ordovician, Gondwana began to drift across the South Pole; this contributed to the Hirnantian glaciation and the associated extinction event.

== Ordovician meteor event ==
The Ordovician meteor event is a proposed shower of meteors that occurred during the Middle Ordovician Epoch, about 467.5 ± 0.28 million years ago, due to the break-up of the L chondrite parent body. It is not associated with any major extinction event. A 2024 study found that craters from this event cluster in a distinct band around the Earth, and that the breakup of the parent body may have formed a ring system for a period of about 40 million years, with frequent falling debris causing these craters.

== Climate and sea level ==
The Early Ordovician climate was very hot, with intense greenhouse conditions and sea surface temperatures comparable to those during the Early Eocene Climatic Optimum. Carbon dioxide levels were very high at the Ordovician period's beginning. By the late Early Ordovician, the Earth cooled, giving way to a more temperate climate in the Middle Ordovician, with the Earth likely entering the Early Palaeozoic Ice Age during the Sandbian, and possibly as early as the Darriwilian or even the Floian. The Dapingian and Sandbian saw major humidification events evidenced by trace metal concentrations in Baltoscandia from this time. Evidence suggests that global temperatures rose briefly in the early Katian (Boda Event), depositing bioherms and radiating fauna across Europe. The early Katian also witnessed yet another humidification event. Further cooling during the Hirnantian, at the end of the Ordovician, led to the Late Ordovician glaciation.

The Ordovician saw the highest sea levels of the Paleozoic, and the low relief of the continents led to many shelf deposits being formed under hundreds of metres of water. The sea level rose more or less continuously throughout the Early Ordovician, leveling off somewhat during the middle of the period. Locally, some regressions occurred, but the sea level rise continued in the beginning of the Late Ordovician. Sea levels fell steadily due to the cooling temperatures for about 3 million years leading up to the Hirnantian glaciation. During this icy stage, the sea level has risen and dropped somewhat. Despite much study, the details remain unresolved. In particular, some researches interpret the fluctuations in sea level as pre-Hibernian glaciation, but sedimentary evidence of glaciation is lacking until the end of the period. There is evidence of glaciers during the Hirnantian on the land we now know as Africa and South America, which were near the South Pole at the time, facilitating the formation of the ice caps of the Hirnantian glaciation.

As with North America and Europe, Gondwana was largely covered with shallow seas during the Ordovician. Shallow clear waters over continental shelves encouraged the growth of organisms that deposit calcium carbonates in their shells and hard parts. The Panthalassic Ocean covered much of the Northern Hemisphere, and other minor oceans included Proto-Tethys, Paleo-Tethys, Khanty Ocean, which was closed off by the Late Ordovician, Iapetus Ocean, and the new Rheic Ocean.

== Geochemistry ==
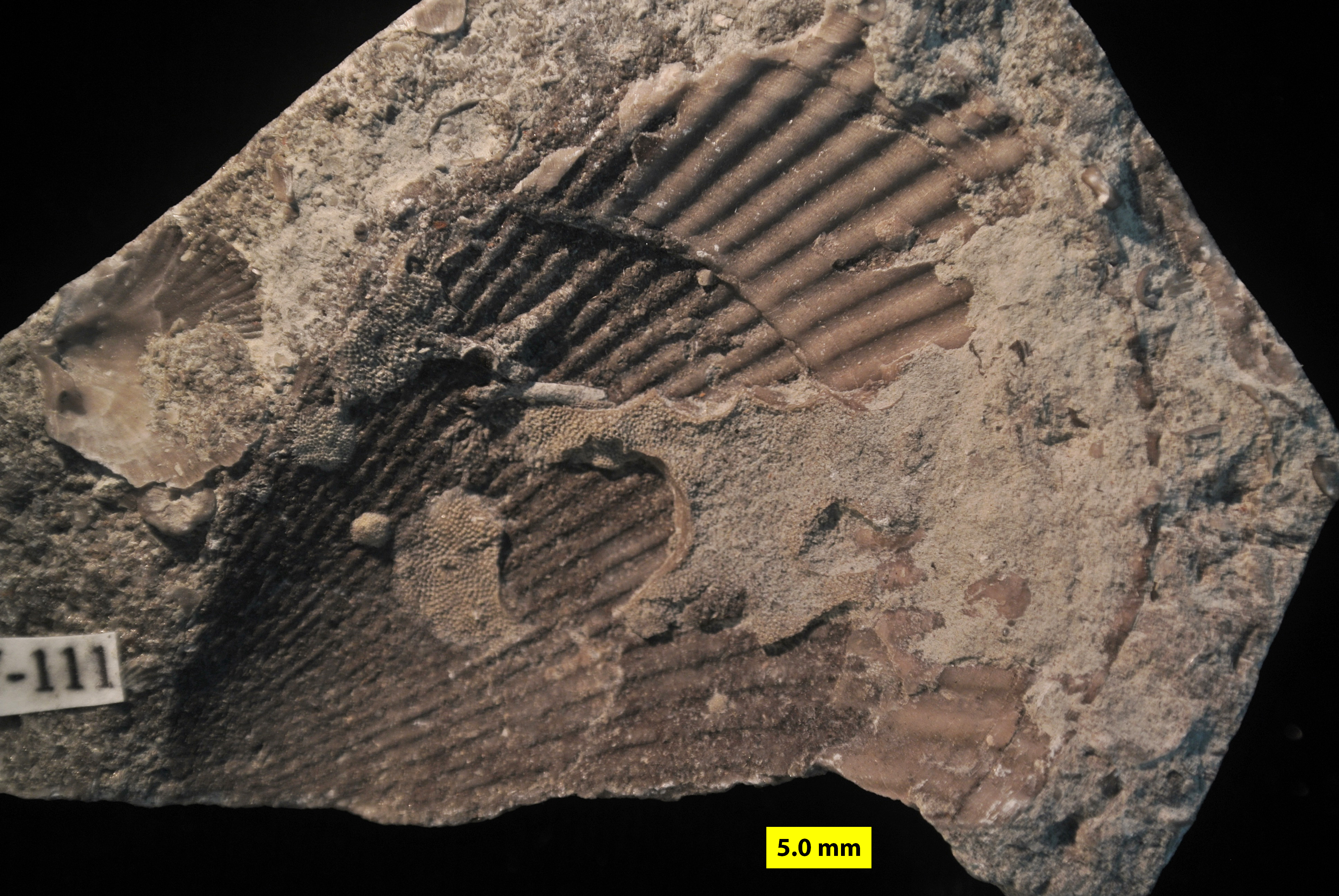
External mold of the Ordovician bivalve Anomalodonta gigantea showing that the original aragonite shell dissolved on the sea floor, leaving a cemented mold for biological encrustation (Waynesville Formation of Franklin County, Indiana).

The Ordovician was a time of calcite sea geochemistry in which low-magnesium calcite was the primary inorganic marine precipitate of calcium carbonate. Carbonate hardgrounds were thus very common, along with calcitic ooids, calcitic cements, and invertebrate faunas with dominantly calcitic skeletons. Biogenic aragonite, like that composing the shells of most molluscs, dissolved rapidly on the sea floor after death.

Unlike Cambrian times, when calcite production was dominated by microbial and non-biological processes, animals (and macroalgae) became a dominant source of calcareous material in Ordovician deposits.

== Life ==
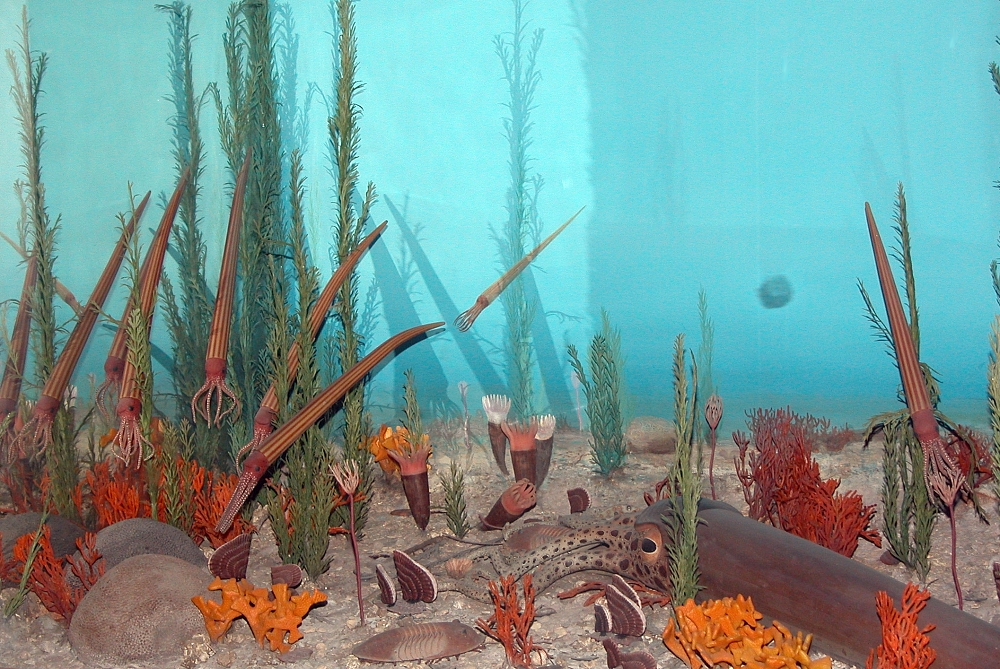
A diorama depicting Ordovician flora and fauna

The Ordovician was characterized by a massive adaptive radiation of marine life, termed the Great Ordovician Biodiversification Event (GOBE), which established the marine ecological template for the remainder of the Paleozoic. The ecological system reached a new grade of complexity far beyond that of the Cambrian, persisting until the present day. Marine faunal genera increased fourfold, ultimately accounting for roughly 12% of all known Phanerozoic marine fauna. The period also documents the earliest evidence for the terrestrialization of life, including non-vascular plants and early arthropods.

=== Fauna ===
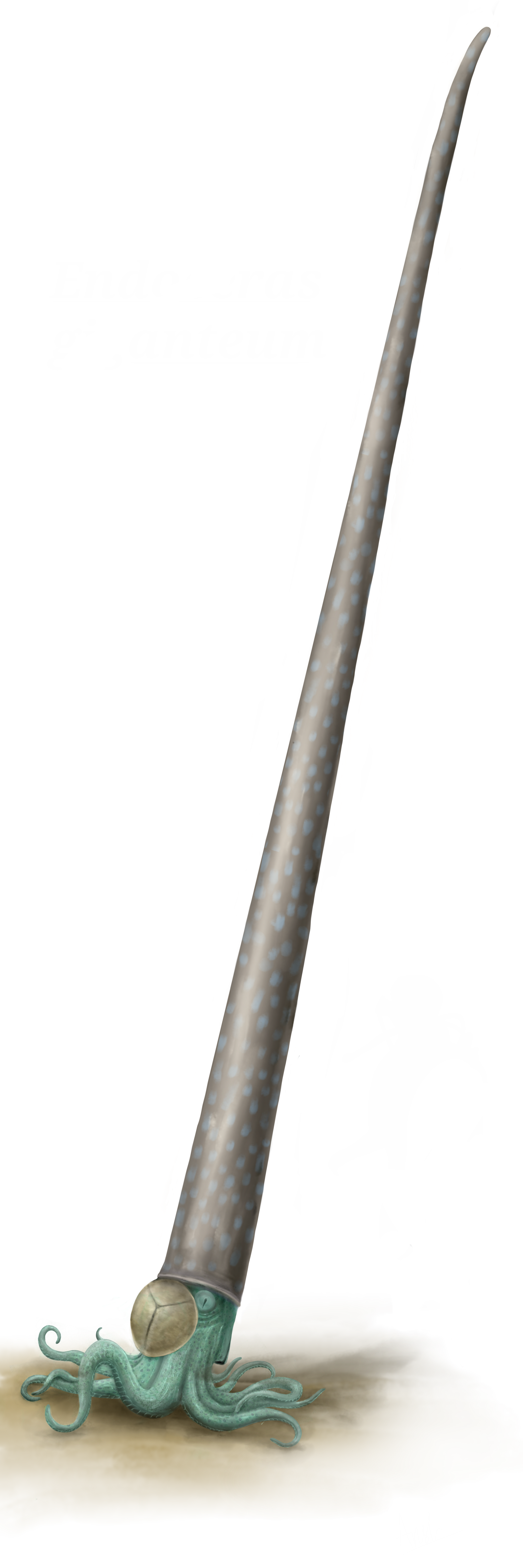
Endoceras, one of the largest predators of the Ordovician

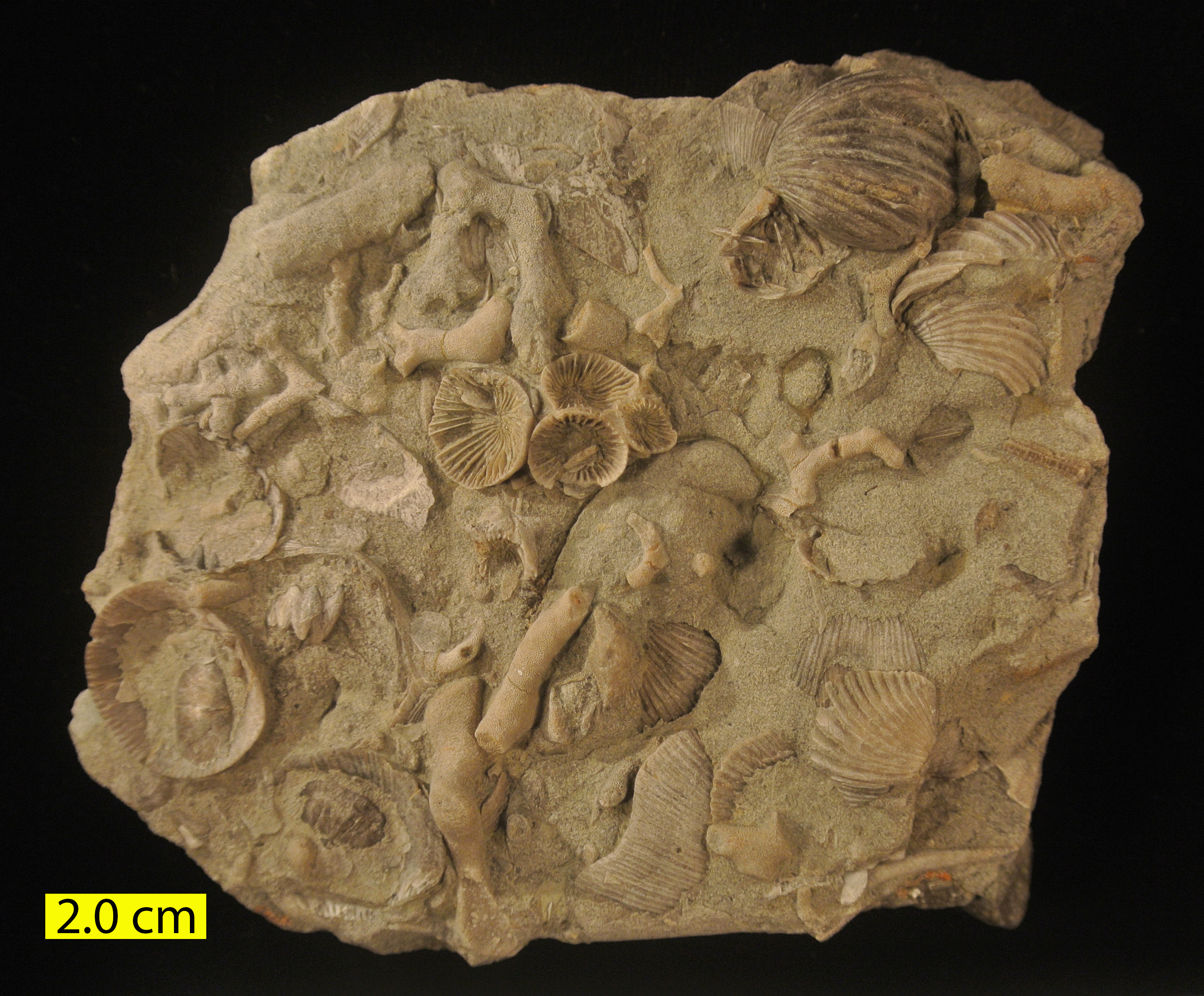
Fossiliferous limestone slab from the Liberty Formation (Upper Ordovician) of Caesar Creek State Park near Waynesville, Ohio.

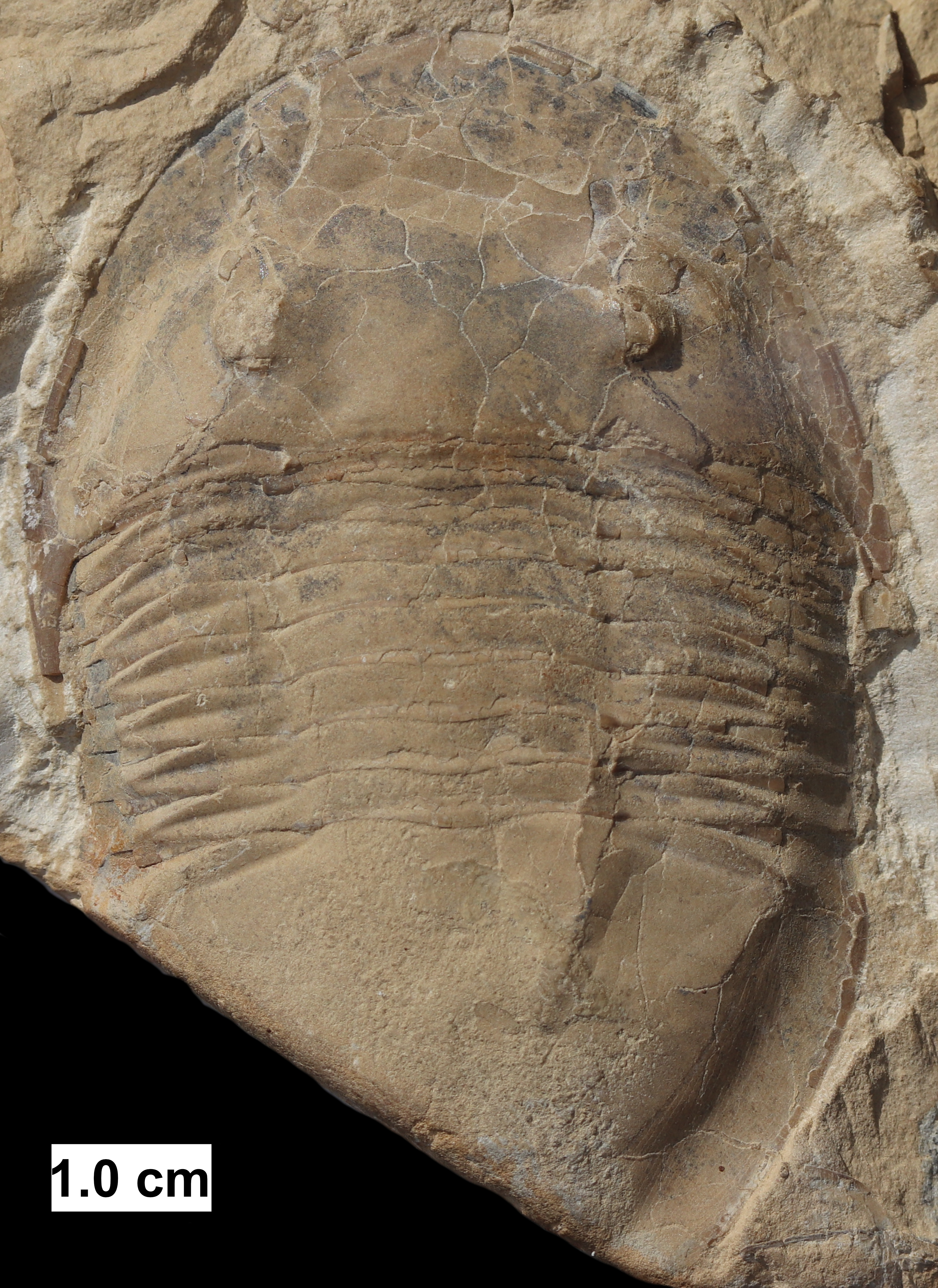
The trilobite Isotelus from Wisconsin

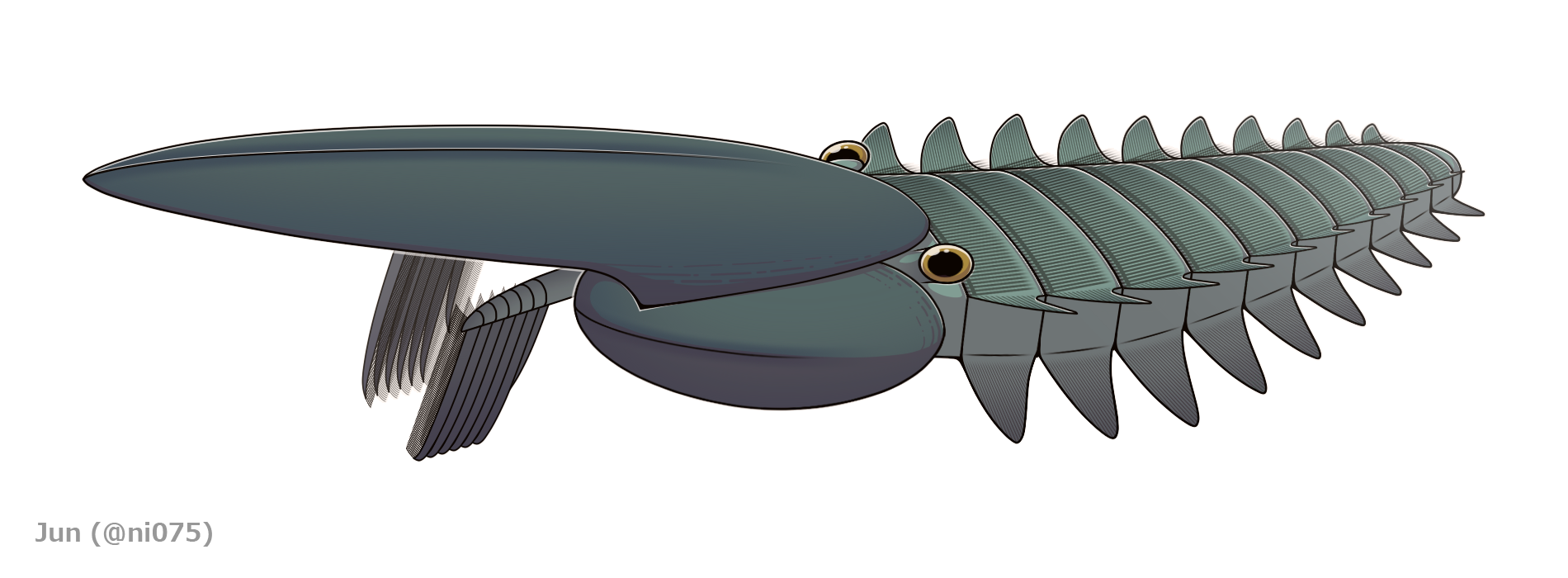
Aegirocassis, a large filter-feeding hurdiid radiodont from Morocco

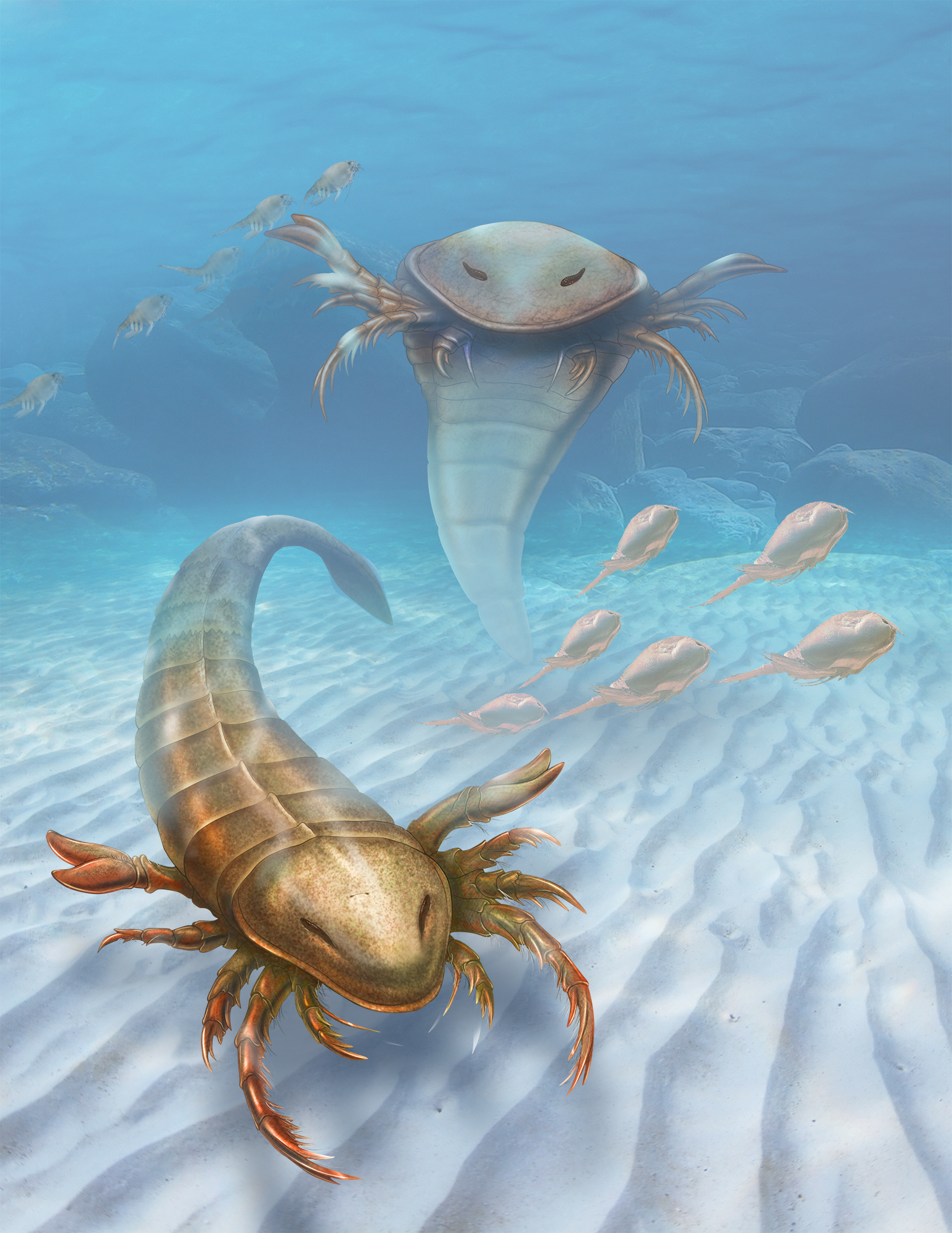
Pentecopterus, an early eurypterid, and found in Iowa

The fauna was dominated by tiered communities of suspension feeders, mainly with short food chains. The inarticulate brachiopod, archaeocyathid, and eocrinoid faunas of the Cambrian were succeeded by groups that dominated the rest of the Paleozoic, such as articulate brachiopods, cephalopods, and crinoids. Articulate brachiopods largely replaced inarticulate brachiopods in continental shelf communities, epitomizing the increased diversity of calcium carbonate shell-secreting organisms. Several animals also underwent miniaturization, becoming much smaller than their Cambrian predecessors.

Ordovician geography had a strong effect on faunal diversity, resulting in marked provincialism. The widely separated continents of Laurentia and Baltica, positioned in the tropics with extensive shallow seas, developed trilobite faunas distinct from Gondwana, while Gondwana developed separate faunas across its tropical and temperate belts. The Tien Shan terrane maintained affinities with Gondwana, the Alborz margin of Gondwana linked to South China, Southeast Asia aligned with Gondwana, and North China was linked to Laurentia and western Gondwana. A separate Celtic biogeographic province also existed. During the Middle Ordovician, beta diversity declined as marine taxa dispersed more broadly across narrowing ocean basins like the Iapetus.

Trilobites experienced extensive diversification in many regions, evolving specialized defensive spines, nodular head shields, shovel-like snouts for burrowing, and elongated eyestalks (as in Asaphus kowalewski), while others became pelagic swimmers (e.g., Aeglina prisca) or lost their eyes altogether. All Late Cambrian trilobite orders persisted, joined by the new order Phacopida.

In the Early Ordovician, trilobites were joined by tabulate corals, strophomenid, rhynchonellid, and orthid brachiopods, bryozoans, planktonic graptolites, conodonts, and echinoderms such as ophiuroids and the first true starfishes. Coral reefs emerged in the early Ordovician, featuring the earliest known octocorals, supported by stable marine carbonate chemistry. Brachiopods expanded into nearly all marine settings and maintained high speciation rates throughout the period. Molluscs became ubiquitous, particularly bivalves, gastropods, and nautiloid cephalopods, the latter diversifying from shallow waters to occupy pelagic niches across all latitudes. Planktonic graptolites thrived, including the globally distributed Sandbian index fossil Nemagraptus gracilis. Chitinozoans radiated explosively across the Tremadocian, becoming vital biostratigraphic markers.

By the Middle Ordovician, trilobite-dominated shelf ecosystems transitioned toward mixed benthic communities of brachiopods, bryozoans, molluscs, cornulitids, tentaculitids, and echinoderms. Rugose corals appeared alongside diversifying tabulates, and graptolites were joined by the Diplograptina. Early jawless armoured vertebrates (ostracoderms), such as Arandaspis, are known from this epoch, and the first jawed vertebrates (Gnathostomata) may have emerged by the Late Ordovician. The Middle Ordovician also witnessed the Ordovician Bioerosion Revolution, marked by a surge in macroborings (such as Trypanites, Palaeosabella, and Petroxestes) penetrating thick calcitic shells and carbonate hardgrounds. Endobiotic symbionts and parasites of corals and bryozoans also became established. On land, molecular clock evidence indicates that stem-group arachnids began colonizing terrestrial environments before the end of the period.

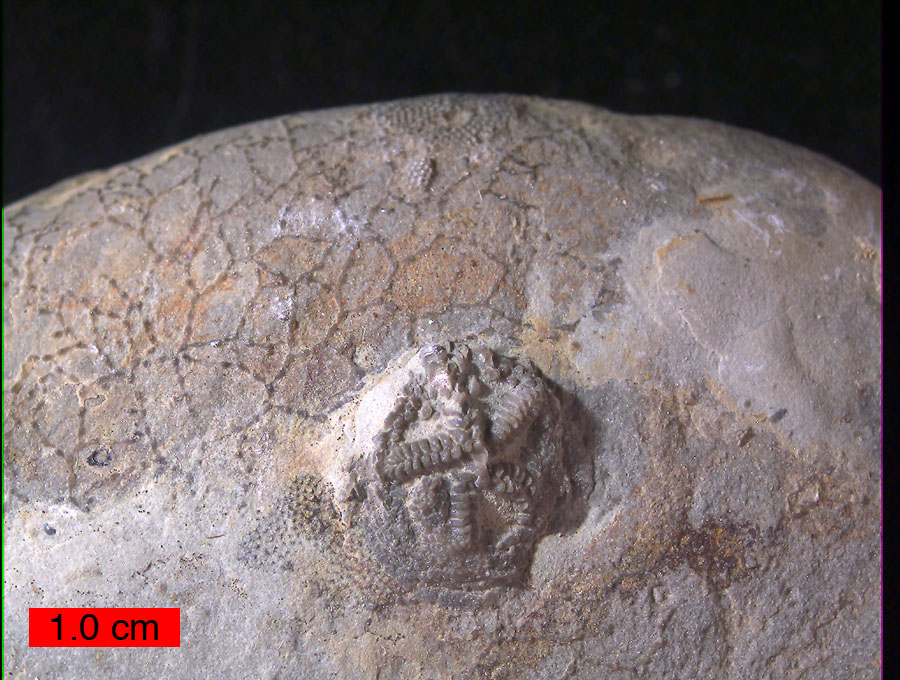
Upper Ordovician edrioasteroid Cystaster stellatus on a cobble from the Kope Formation in northern Kentucky with the cyclostome bryozoan Corynotrypa in the background

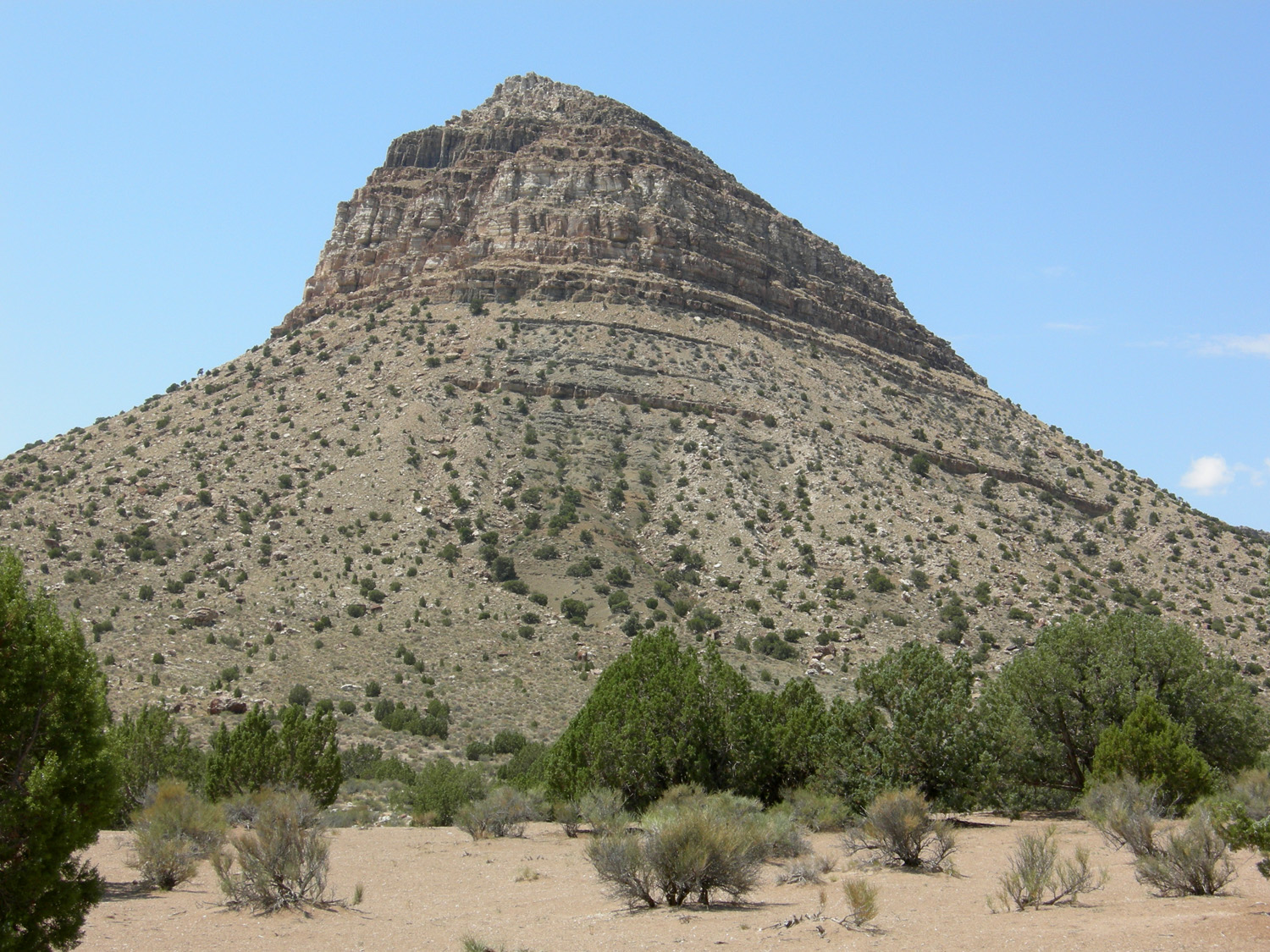
Middle Ordovician fossiliferous shales and limestones at Fossil Mountain, west-central Utah

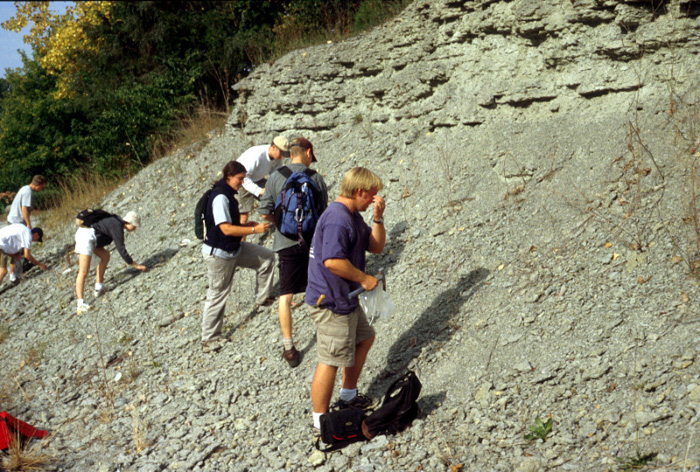
Outcrop of Upper Ordovician rubbly limestone and shale, southern Indiana

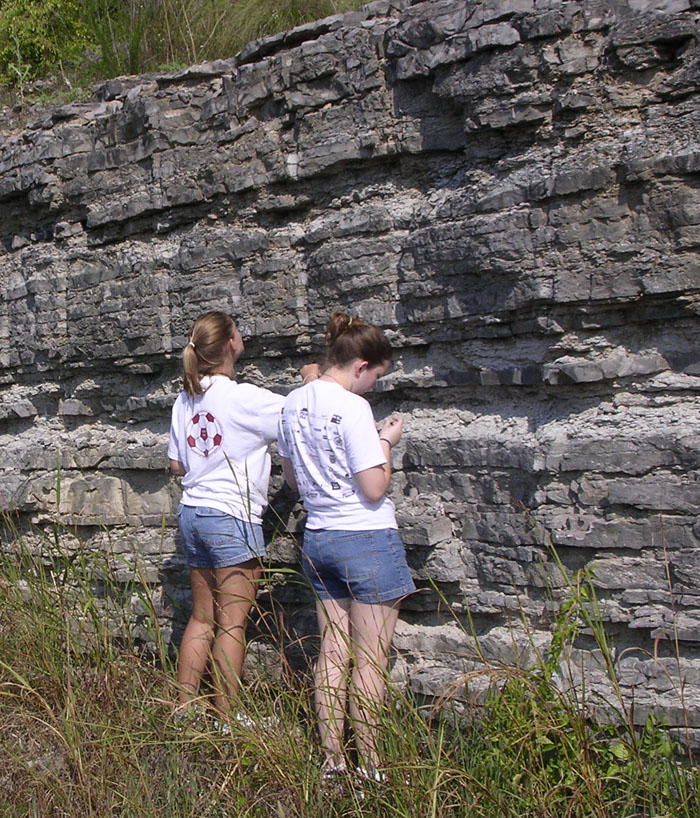
Outcrop of Upper Ordovician limestone and minor shale, central Tennessee

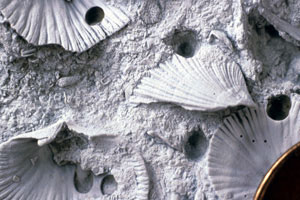
Trypanites borings in an Ordovician hardground, southeastern Indiana

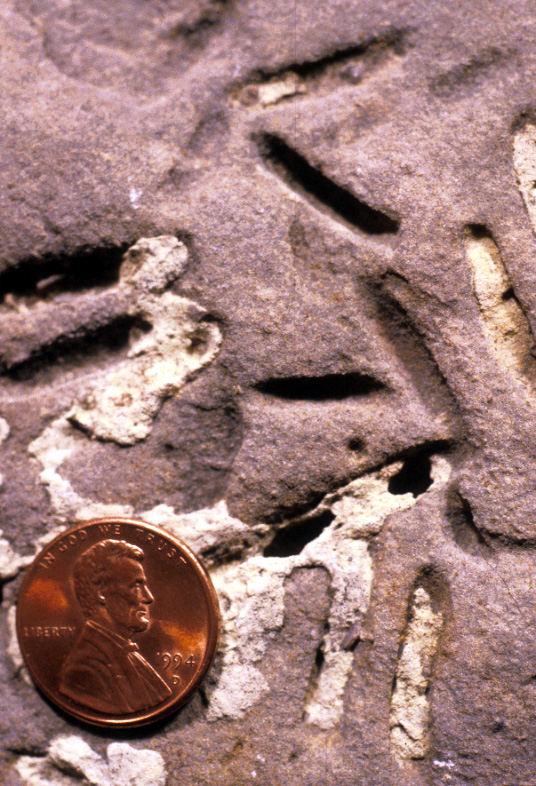
Petroxestes borings in an Ordovician hardground, southern Ohio

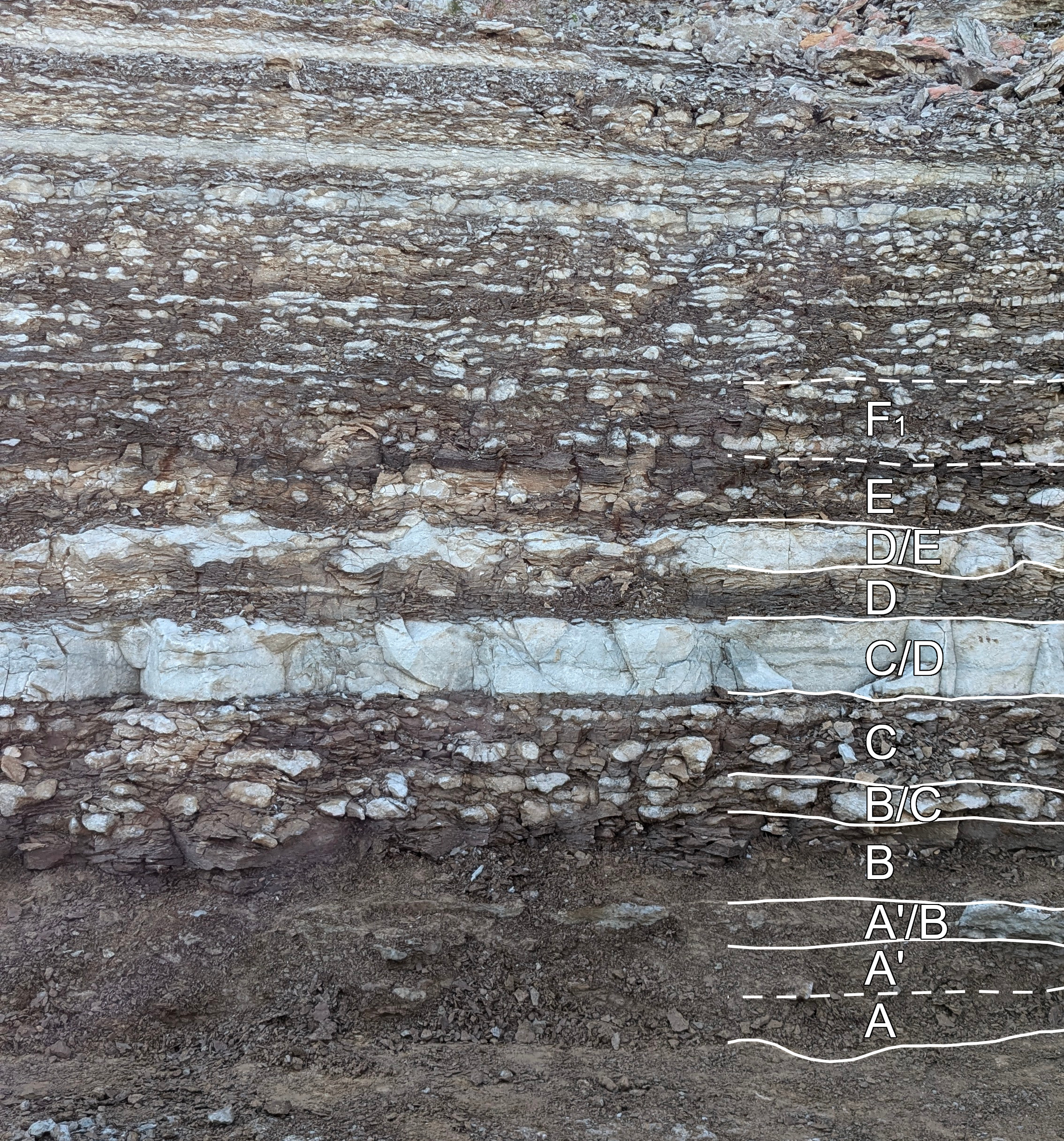
Outcrop of Ordovician kukersite oil shale, northern Estonia

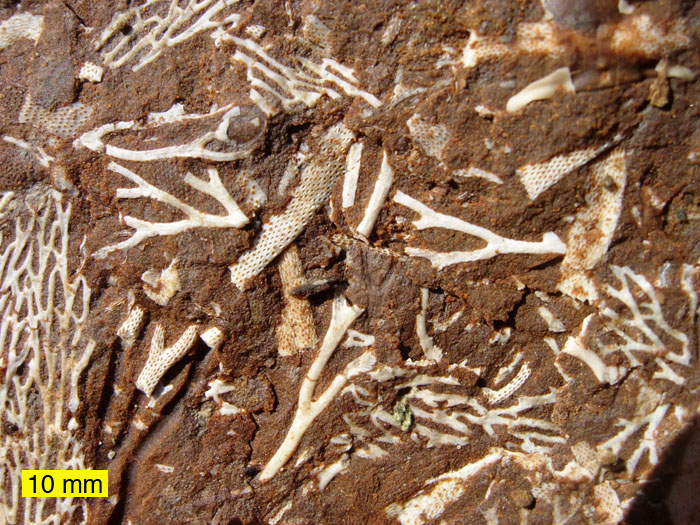
Bryozoan fossils in Ordovician kukersite oil shale, northern Estonia

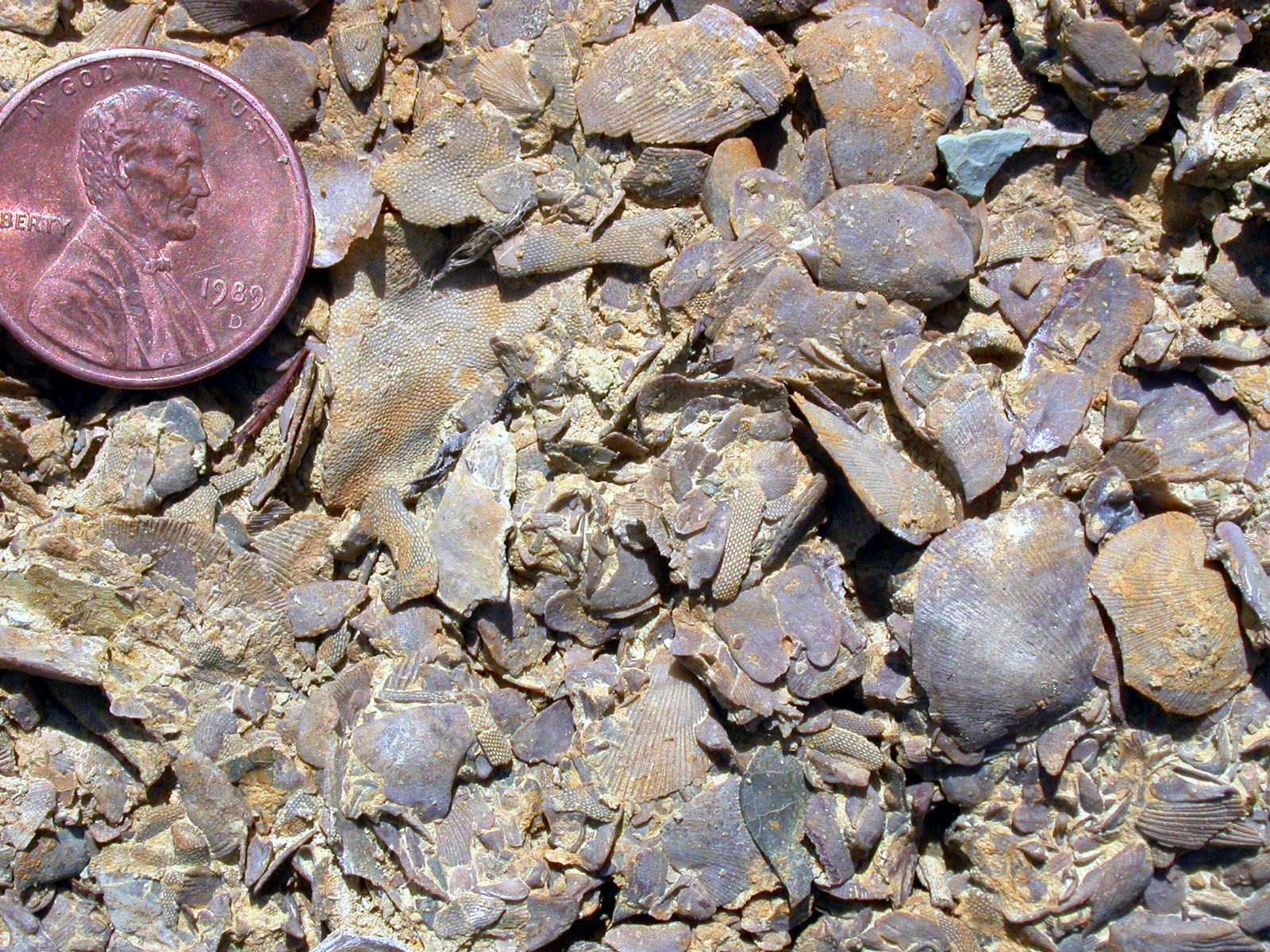
Brachiopods and bryozoans in an Ordovician limestone, southern Minnesota

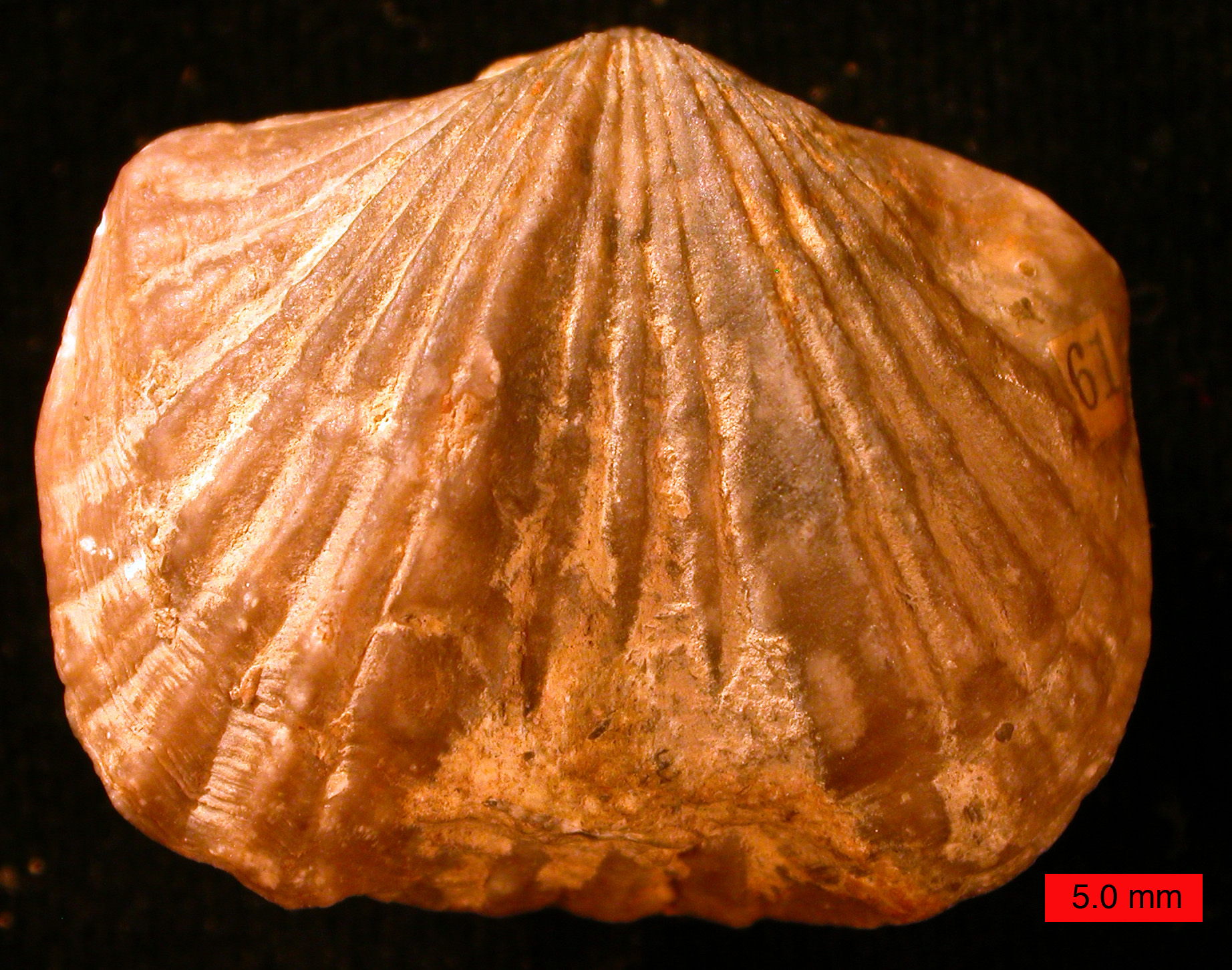
Vinlandostrophia ponderosa, Maysvillian (Upper Ordovician) near Madison, Indiana (scale bar is 5.0 mm)

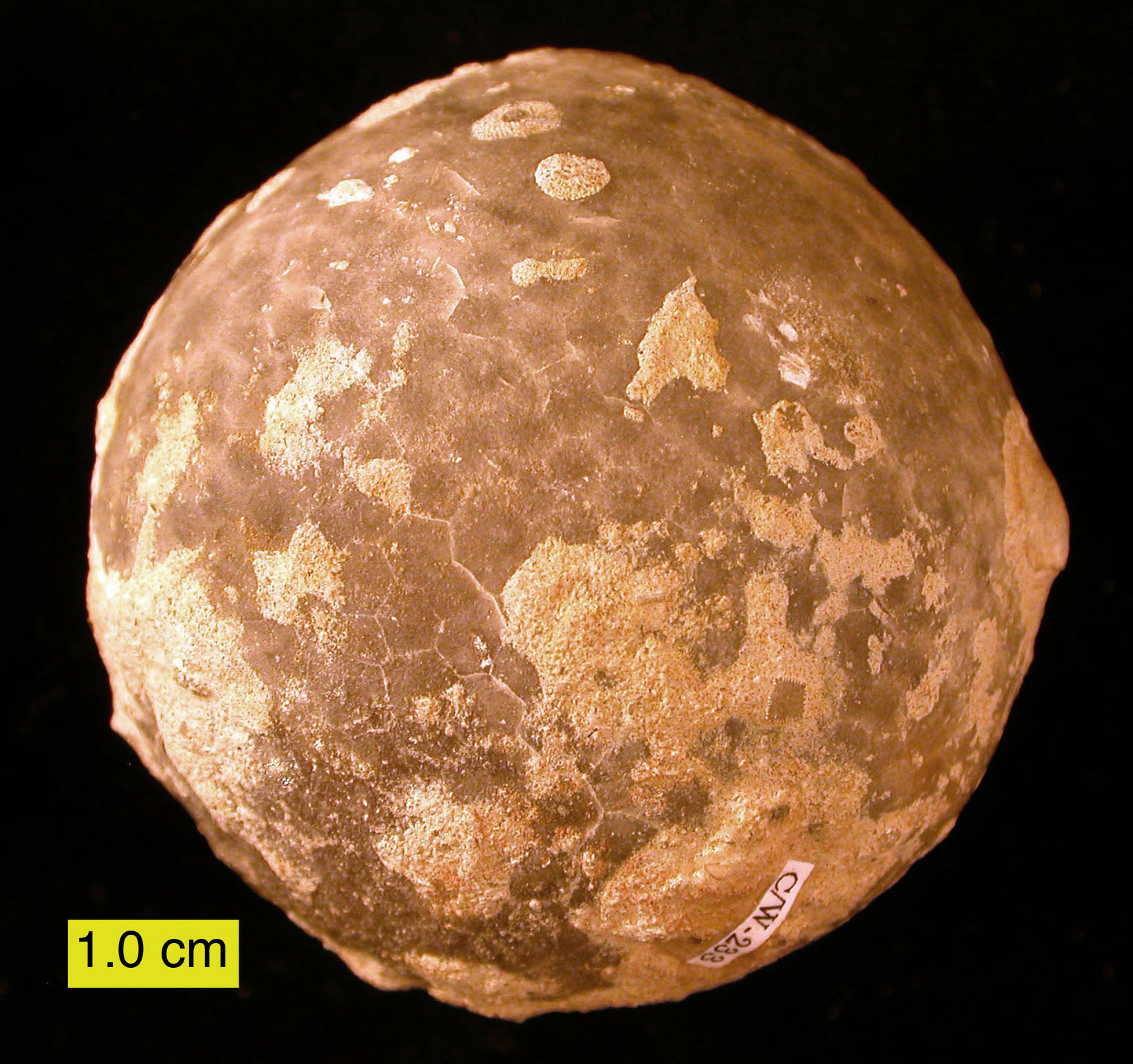
The Ordovician cystoid Echinosphaerites (an extinct echinoderm) from northeastern Estonia; approximately 5 cm in diameter

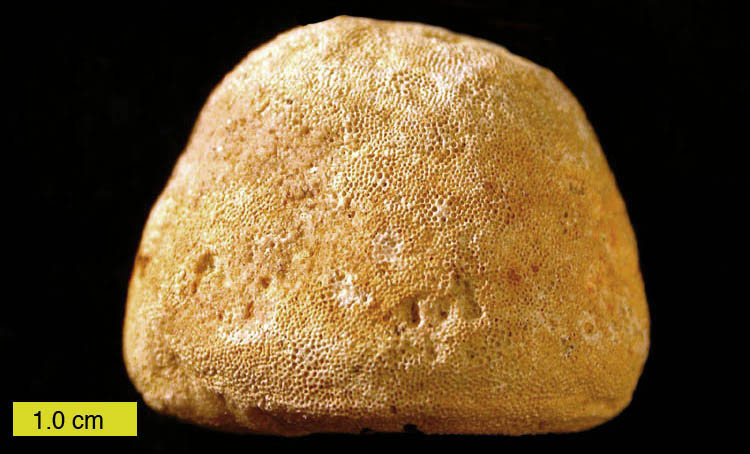
Prasopora, a trepostome bryozoan from the Ordovician of Iowa

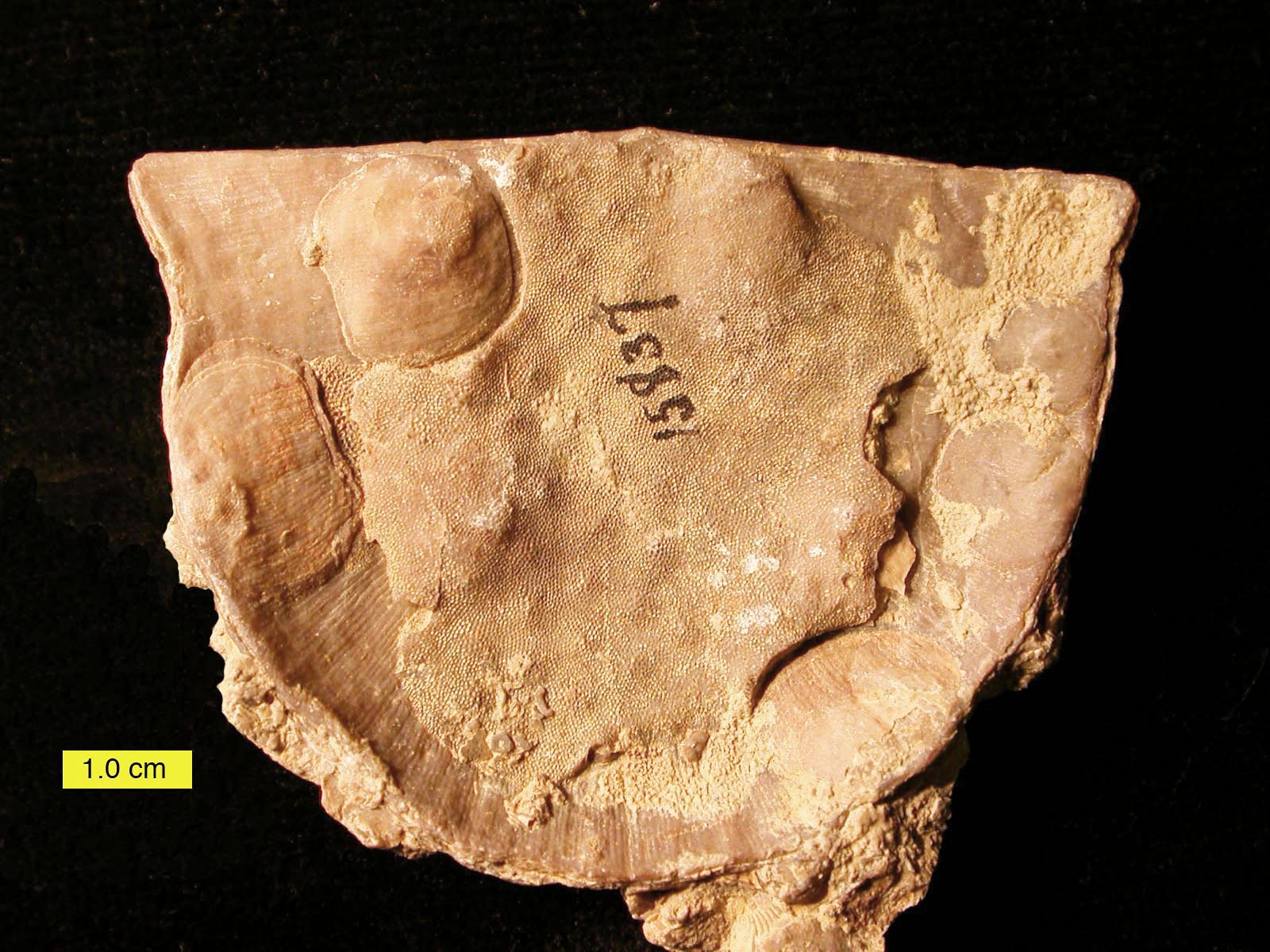
An Ordovician strophomenid brachiopod with encrusting inarticulate brachiopods and a bryozoan

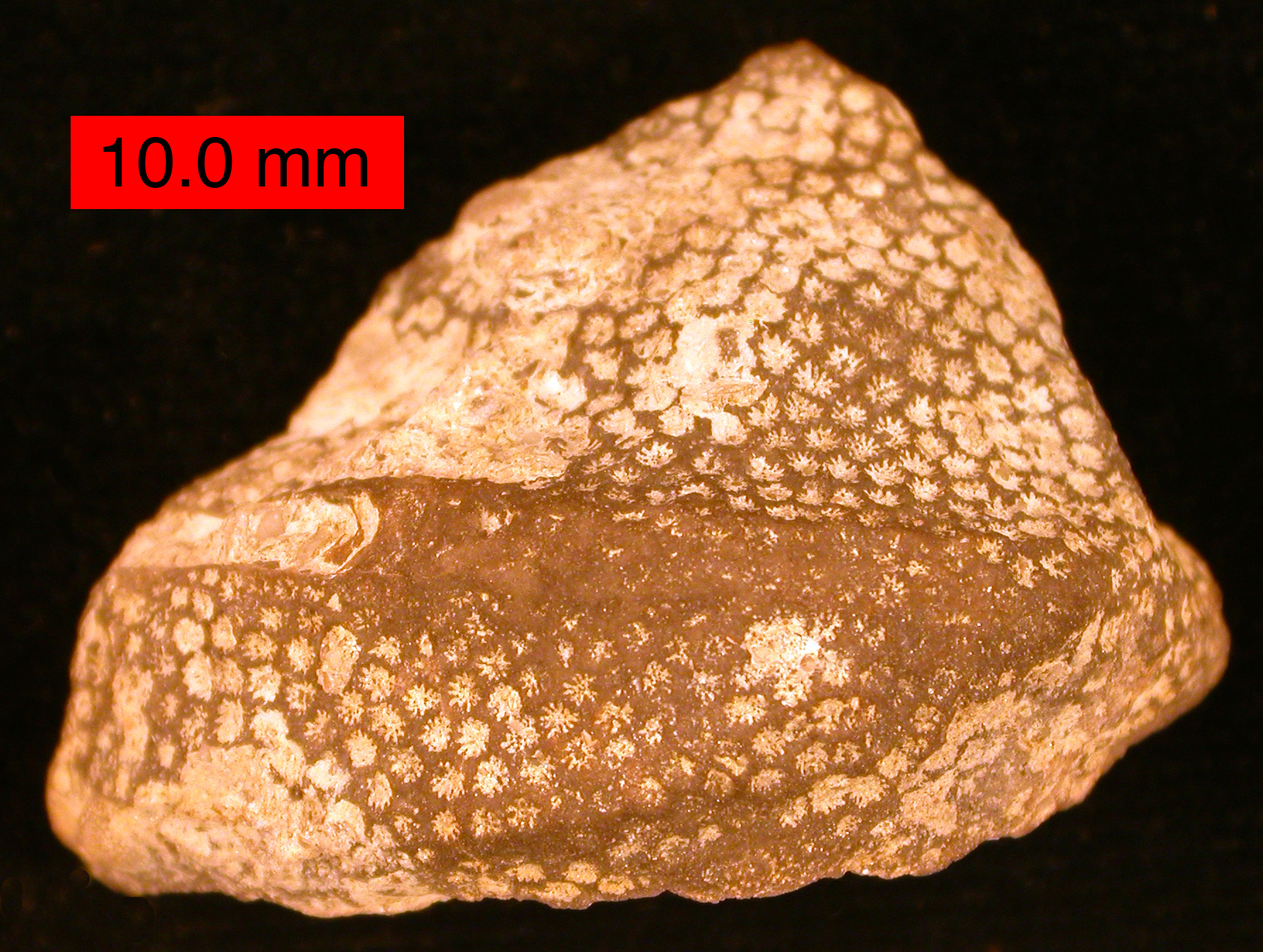
The heliolitid coral Protaraea richmondensis encrusting a gastropod; Cincinnatian (Upper Ordovician) of southeastern Indiana

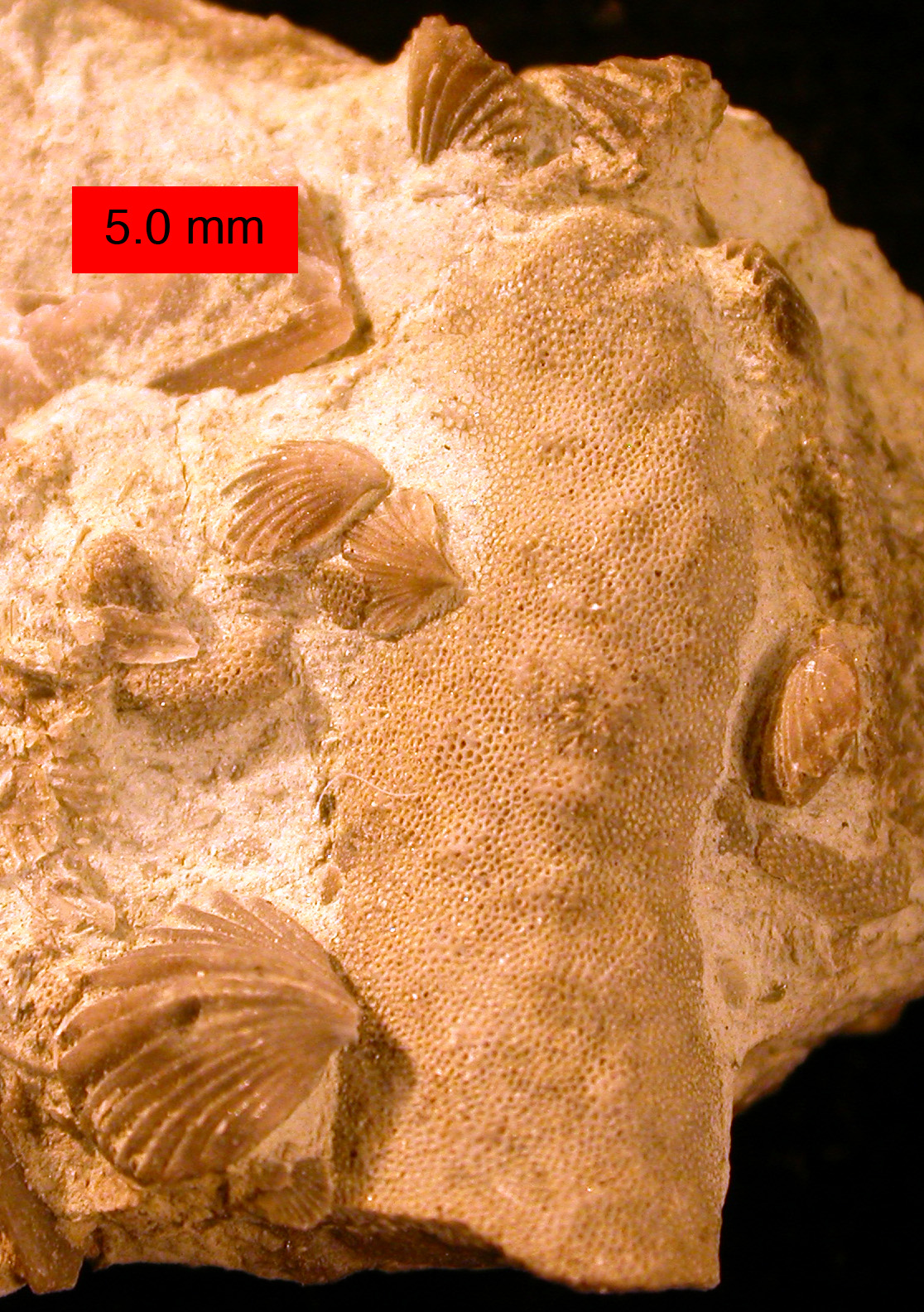
Zygospira modesta, atrypid brachiopods, preserved in their original positions on a trepostome bryozoan from the Cincinnatian (Upper Ordovician) of southeastern Indiana

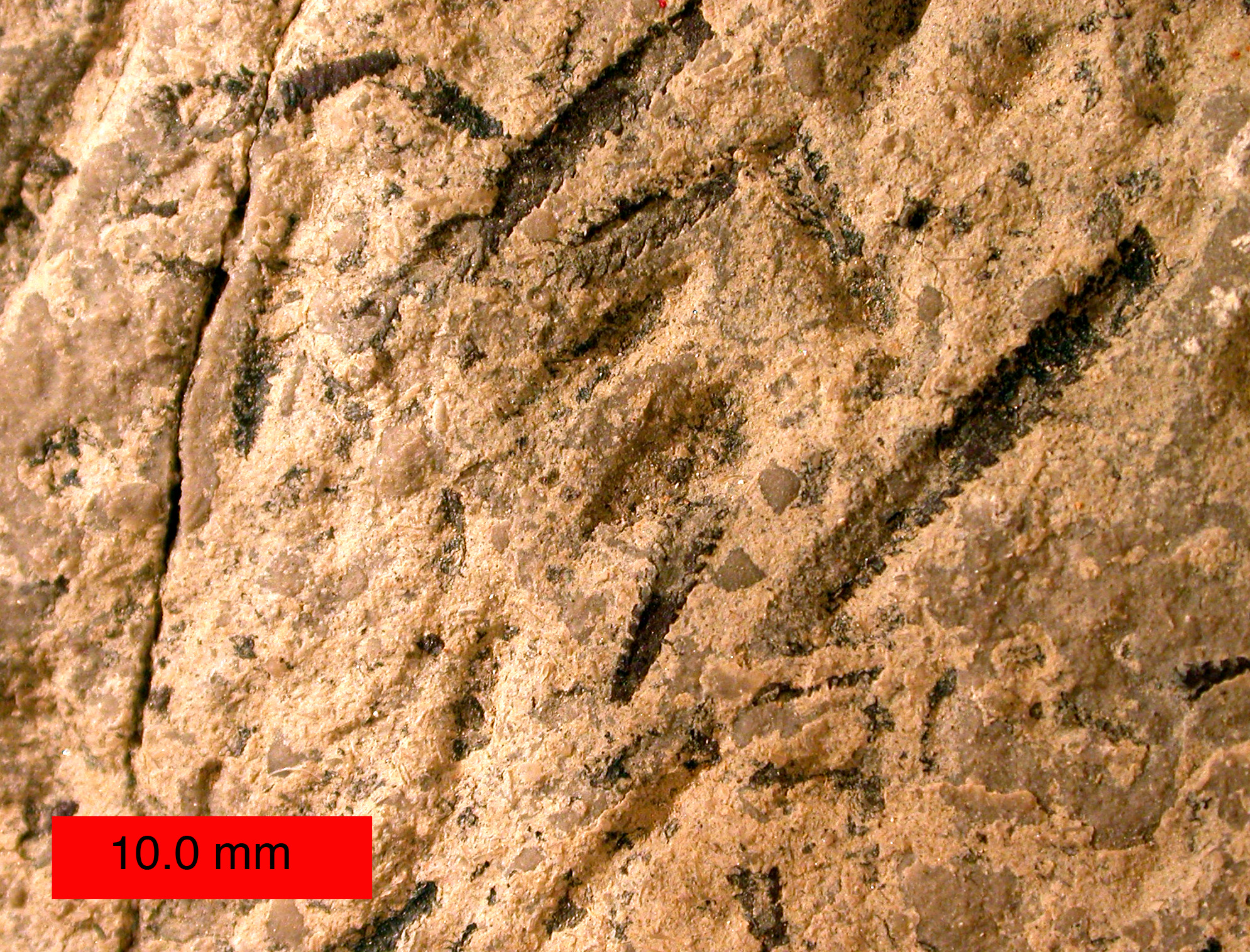
Graptolites (Amplexograptus) from the Ordovician near Caney Springs, Tennessee

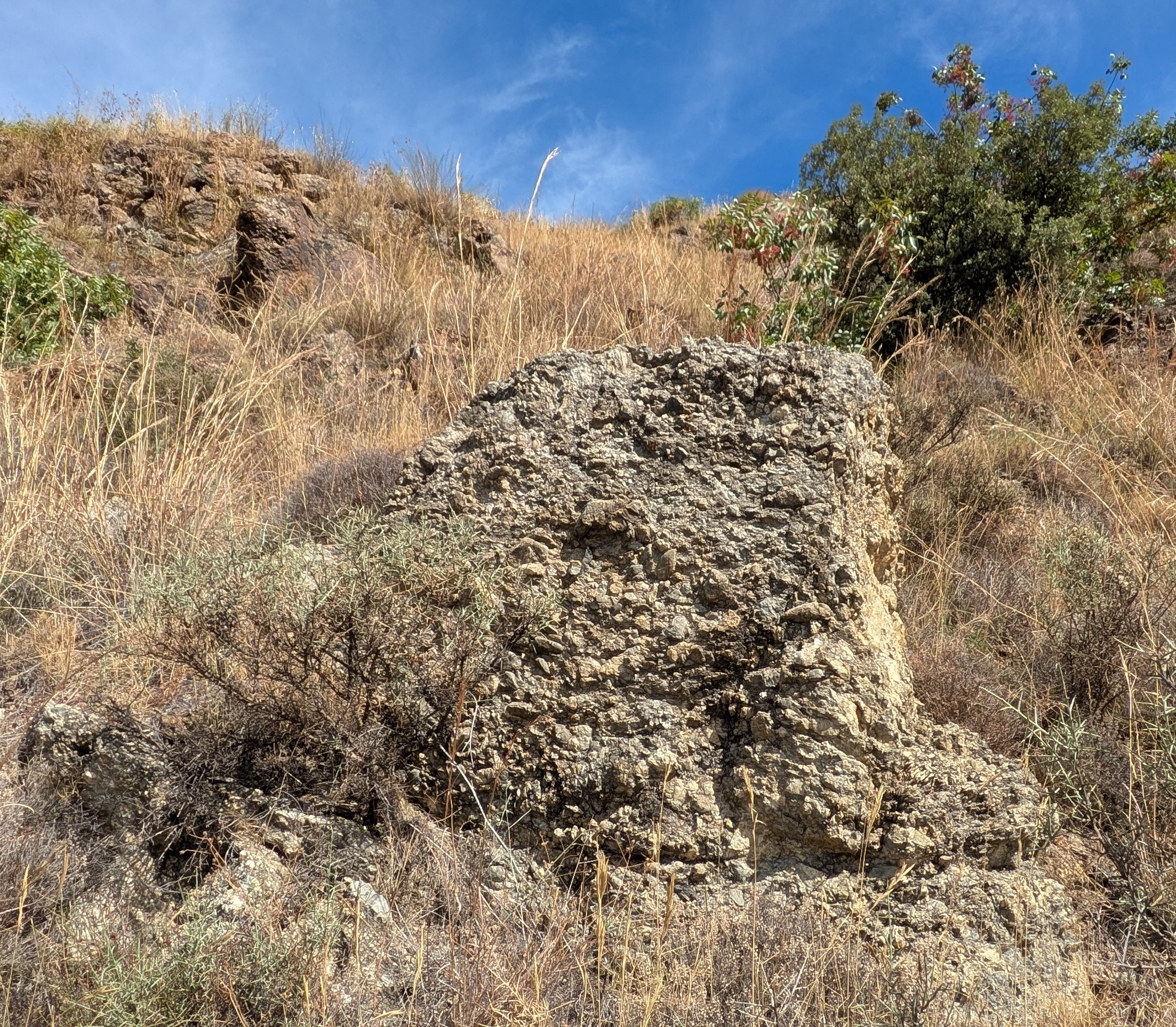
Outcrop in Serdinya (Eastern Pyrenees, France) of "Caradoc conglomerate" at the base of the Upper Ordovician (c. 460 Ma).

=== Flora ===
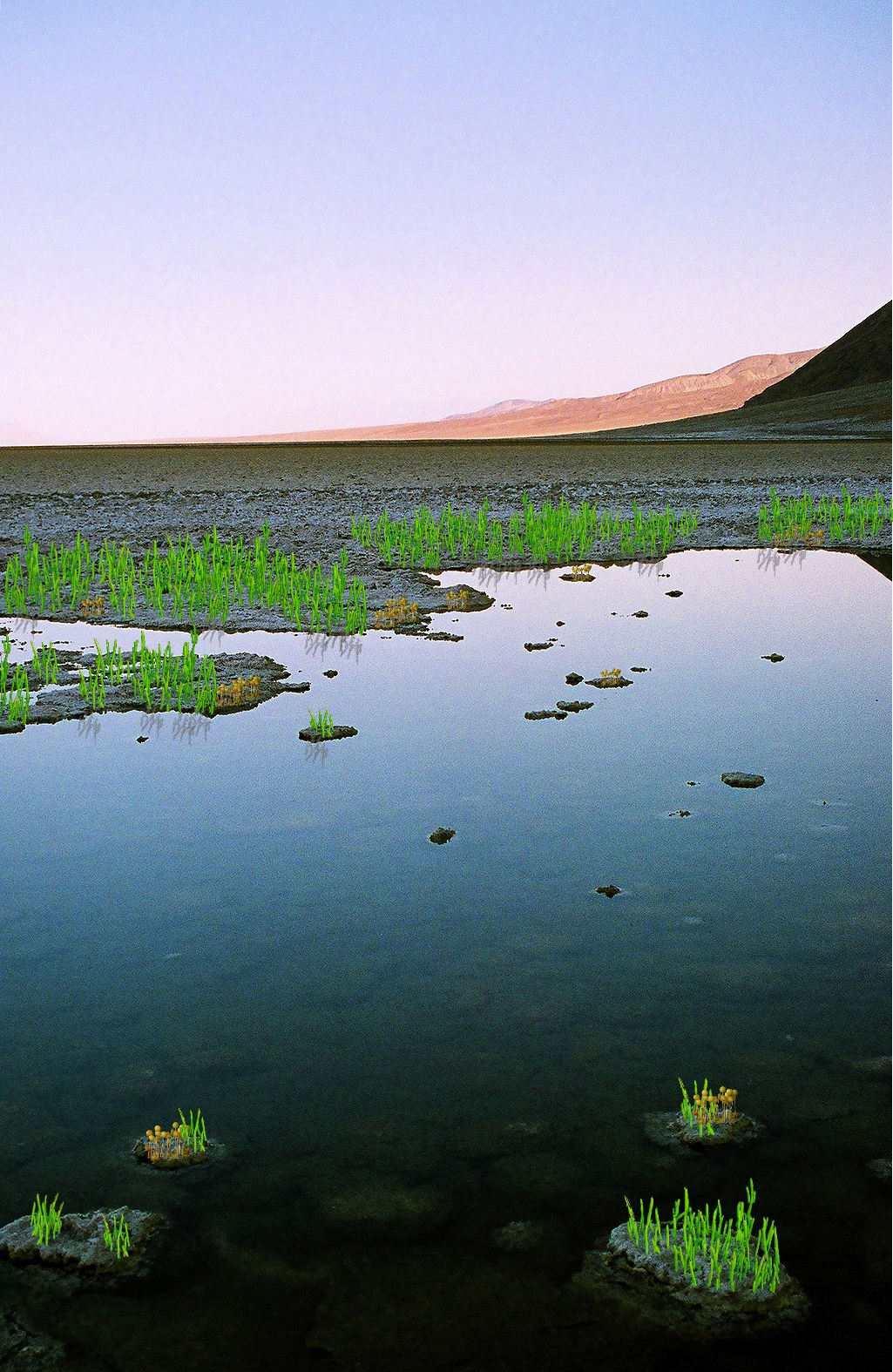
Colonization of land would have been limited to shorelines

Green algae were common in the Late Cambrian and remained abundant in the Ordovician. Terrestrial plants probably evolved from green algae, first appearing as tiny non-vascular forms resembling liverworts in the middle to late Ordovician. Fossil spores found in Ordovician sedimentary rocks are typical of early bryophytes.

Among the first terrestrial fungi were likely arbuscular mycorrhiza fungi (Glomerales), which facilitated early plant colonization through mycorrhizal symbiosis by releasing mineral nutrients for plant uptake. Fossilized hyphae and spores from the Ordovician of Wisconsin date to approximately 460 Ma, when land vegetation consisted predominantly of non-vascular bryophyte-like plants.

=== Microbiota ===
Though stromatolites had declined from their peak in the Proterozoic, they continued to persist in localised shallow-marine environments.

== End of the period ==
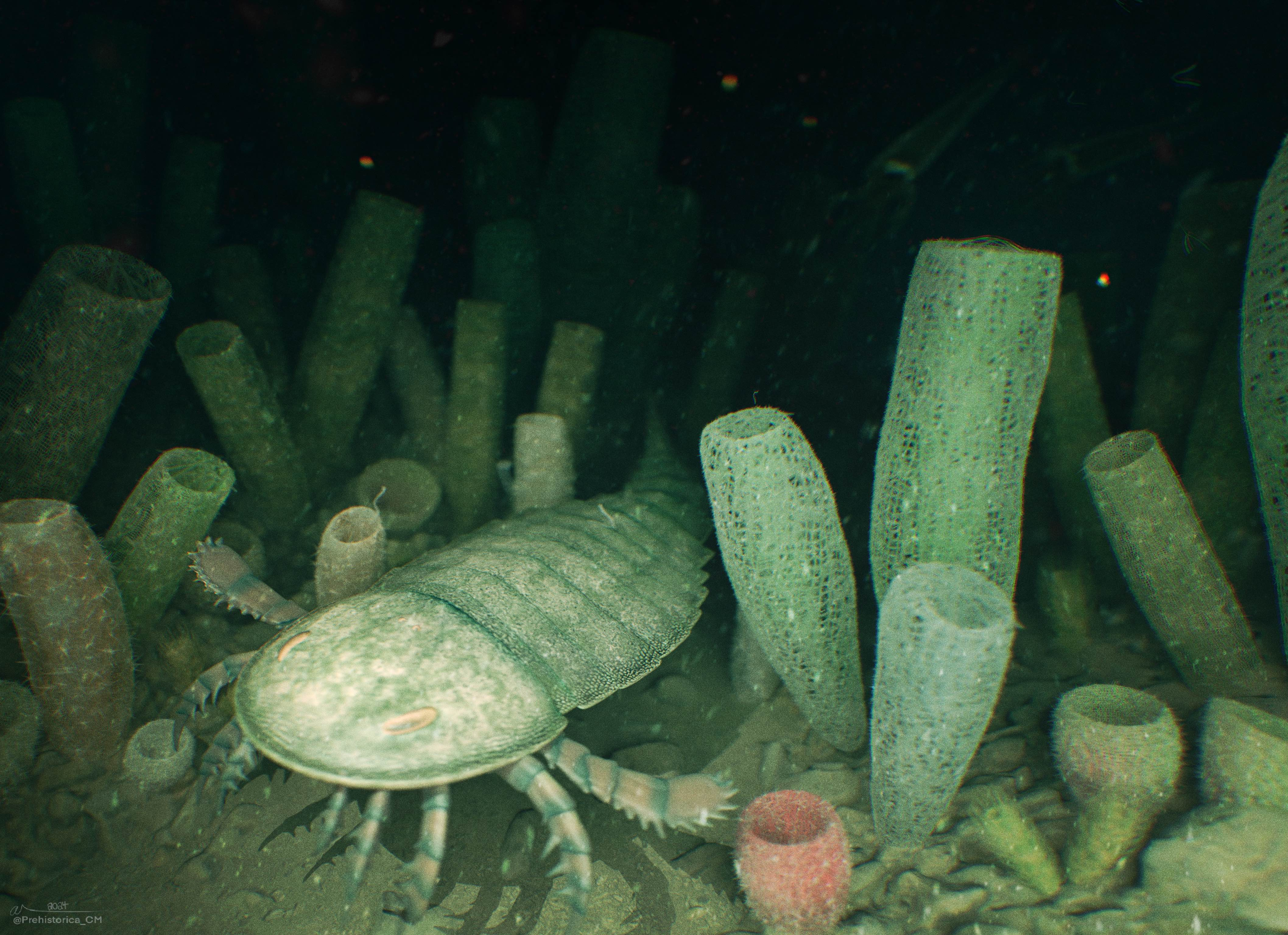
The Anji Biota (Wenchang Formation, Zhejiang Province, China) preserves abundant and diverse glass sponges and graptolites as well as rare examples of other marine animals (such as the eurypterid Archopterus) living at a depth of several hundred metres. It is dated to just after the Hirnantian mass extinction at the end of the Ordovician period.

The Ordovician came to a close in a series of extinction events that, taken together, comprise the second largest of the "Big Five" mass extinctions in Earth's history in terms of generic mortality, surpassed only by the Permian–Triassic extinction event. The extinctions occurred approximately 447–444 million years ago and mark the boundary between the Ordovician and the following Silurian Period. At that time, all complex multicellular organisms were marine, and roughly 49% of all genera disappeared; brachiopods and bryozoans were heavily devastated, alongside severe losses among trilobite, conodont, and graptolite clades.

=== Causes and environmental collapse ===
The primary trigger is widely considered to have been the onset of cold conditions in the late Katian, leading to the severe Hirnantian glaciation that disrupted the prolonged Paleozoic greenhouse state. Oxygen isotopes in fossil brachiopods suggest this glacial peak was brief, lasting approximately 0.5 to 1.5 million years, although some models argue temperate conditions did not fully recover until the late Silurian.

The glaciation was preceded by a dramatic drawdown in atmospheric carbon dioxide (from approximately 7,000 ppm to 4,400 ppm). This decline may have been driven by silicate weathering following volcanic emissions, or accelerated by enhanced geochemical weathering by early land plants and lichens. As Gondwana migrated over the South Pole, massive continental ice sheets accumulated in North Africa and northeastern South America.

Glacial expansion triggered extensive eustatic sea-level drops, draining epicontinental shallow seas and destroying widespread shelf habitats. Organisms restricted to isolated shelf basins were severely affected. Extinction occurred in two distinct pulses: warm-adapted tropical taxa were eradicated during the initial cooling and habitat retreat, while cool-water taxa adapted to the glacial maximum were devastated during the subsequent deglacial warming and sea-level transgression. Alternatively, an extraterrestrial mechanism has been proposed in which a ten-second gamma-ray burst depleted Earth's ozone layer, driving photochemical cooling and ultraviolet sterilisation of shallow waters. Recent sequence-stratigraphic analyses argue that the event was a single protracted ecological turnover driven by shifting sedimentation and water depths.

=== Survival and recovery ===
Taxa capable of adjusting to broad thermal and bathymetric ranges survived to repopulate vacant ecospace. Increased deep-ocean ventilation during the glaciation supported the radiation of cosmopolitan Hirnantian faunas across bathyal seafloors. Following the melting of continental ice caps, sea levels rose and stabilised, initiating renewed radiation across flooded epicontinental shelves during the early Silurian. The post-extinction recovery is notable for its high frequency of "Lazarus taxa", which vanished from the late Katian and Hirnantian fossil records only to reappear in the Silurian, indicating that small relict populations persisted within deeper or geographically isolated refugia.
