= Aragonite sea =

Chemical conditions of the sea favouring aragonite deposition

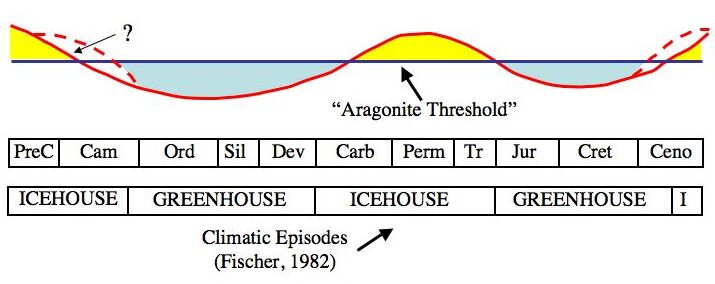
The alternation of calcite and aragonite seas through geologic time. High-Mg Calcite and, less abundantly, Aragonite Calcite; Mg content generally lower, increasing towards "Threshold"

An aragonite sea contains aragonite and high-magnesium calcite as the primary inorganic calcium carbonate precipitates. The reason lies in the highly hydrated Mg^{2+} divalent ion, the second most abundant cation in seawater after Na^{+}, known to be a strong inhibitor of CaCO_{3} crystallization at the nucleation stage. The chemical conditions of the seawater must be notably high in magnesium content relative to calcium (high Mg/Ca ratio) for an aragonite sea to form. This is in contrast to a calcite sea in which seawater low in magnesium content relative to calcium (low Mg/Ca ratio) favors the formation of low-magnesium calcite as the primary inorganic marine calcium carbonate precipitate.

The Early Paleozoic and the Middle to Late Mesozoic oceans were predominantly calcite seas, whereas the Middle Paleozoic through the Early Mesozoic and the Cenozoic (including today) are characterized by aragonite seas.

Aragonite seas occur due to several factors, the most obvious of these is a high seawater Mg/Ca ratio (Mg/Ca > 2), which occurs during intervals of slow seafloor spreading. However, the sea level, temperature, and calcium carbonate saturation state of the surrounding system also determine which polymorph of calcium carbonate (aragonite, low-magnesium calcite, high-magnesium calcite) will form.

Likewise, the occurrence of calcite seas is controlled by the same suite of factors controlling aragonite seas, with the most obvious being a low seawater Mg/Ca ratio (Mg/Ca < 2), which occurs during intervals of rapid seafloor spreading.

This trend has been observed by looking at the chemistry of both biogenic and abiogenic carbonates, dating them, and analyzing the conditions under which they were formed. Various studies have examined these relationships and concluded that the mineralogy of both biogenic (major carbonate sediment and rock-forming organisms) and abiogenic marine carbonates (limestones and marls) throughout Phanerozoic time has generally been synchronized with calcium carbonate mineralogies expected from seawater magnesium/calcium ratios reconstructed from derivatives of ancient seawater trapped in halite crystals in the geologic record (fluid inclusions).
