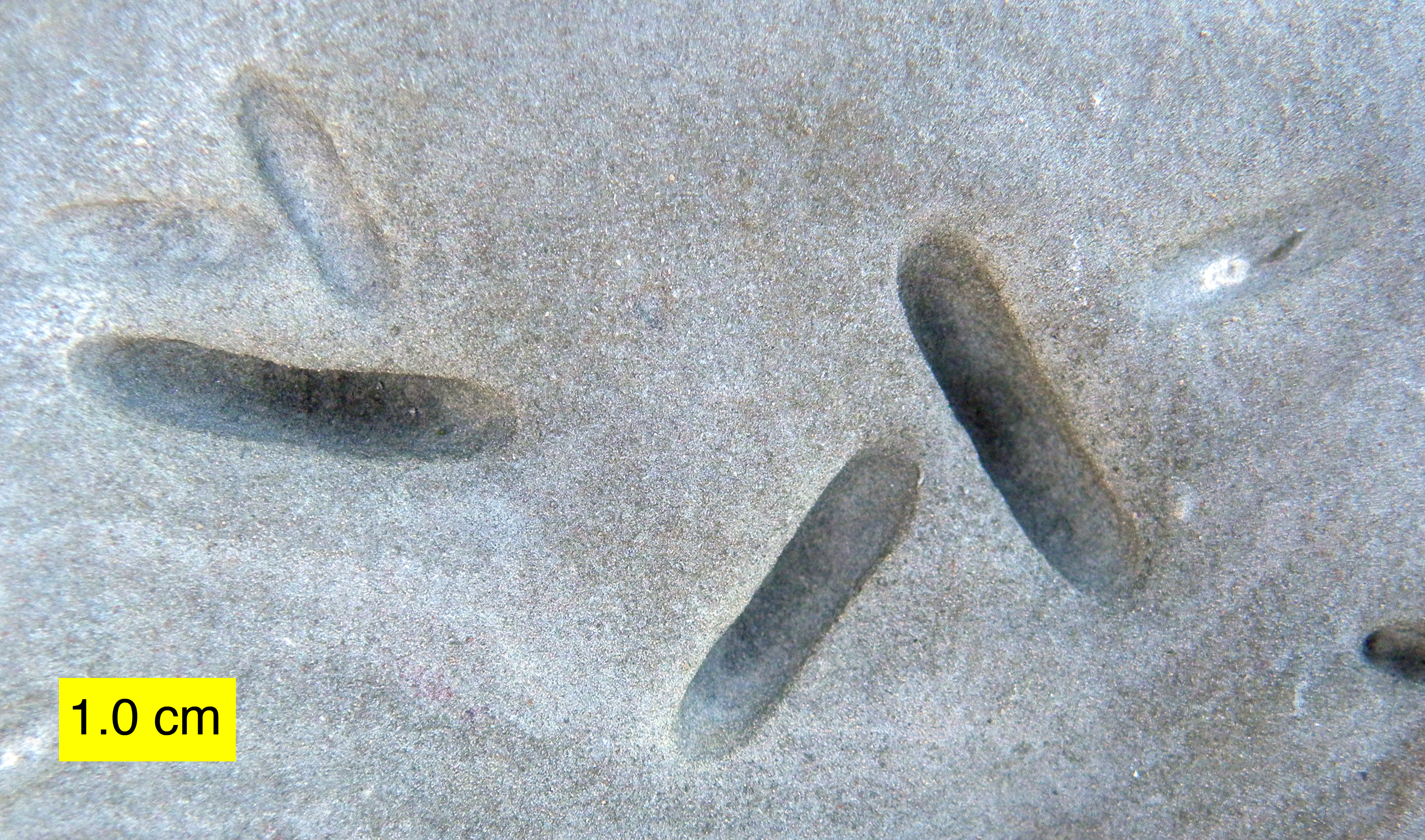
- Petroxestes pera borings in an Upper Ordovician hardground (Waynesville Formation, southern Ohio).

Trace fossil classification
- Ichnofamily: †Rogerellidae
- Ichnogenus: †Petroxestes; Wilson & Palmer, 1988

Type ichnospecies
- Petroxestes pera Wilson & Palmer, 1988

Ichnospecies
- P. altera Jagt et al., 2009; P. pera Wilson & Palmer, 1988

= Petroxestes =

Trace fossil

Petroxestes is a shallow, elongate boring (a type of trace fossil) originally found excavated in carbonate skeletons and hardgrounds of the Upper Ordovician of North America. These Ordovician borings were likely made by the mytilacean bivalve Corallidomus as it ground a shallow groove in the substrate to maintain its feeding position. They are thus the earliest known bivalve borings. Petroxestes was later described from the Lower Silurian of Anticosti Island (Canada). and the Miocene of the Caribbean.
